= List of Gibraltarians =

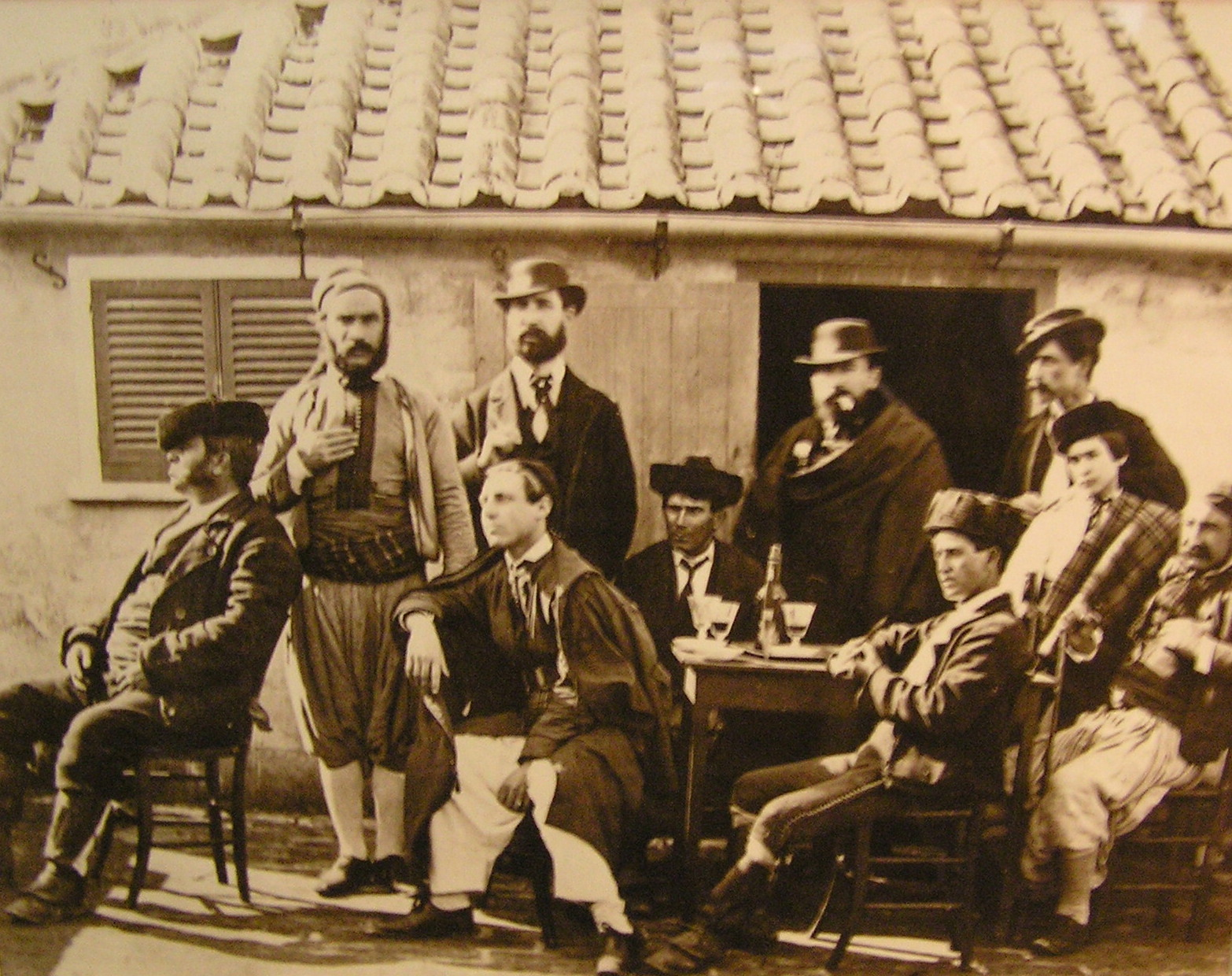
People of Gibraltar, 1863.

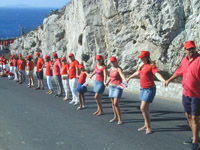
Gibraltarians encircle The Rock during the tercentenary of British Gibraltar, 4 August 2004.

The Gibraltarians (also called Llanitos/as, Spanish: Gibraltareños/as) are a cultural group or nation from the British overseas territory of Gibraltar.

The following is a list of notable Gibraltarians or people born in Gibraltar, listed in alphabetical order within categories:

== Academics ==
- Daniella Tilbury, university professor, former CEO of the University of Gibraltar.
- Alfred Hermida, media scholar, author and journalist who is a full professor and former director of the School of Journalism, Writing, and Media (2015-2020) at the University of British Columbia, and co-founder of The Conversation Canada.

== Actors ==
- Levy Attias (1924–2010), best known for his role as Juan Cervantes in the ITV British comedy series Mind Your Language
- Nicholas Boulton, actor. His extensive career has encompassed stage, screen, and radio. He has played leading and major supporting roles for many British stage productions including for the Royal Shakespeare Company.
- Ava Addams (b. 1979), pornographic actress and erotic model of British descent.

== Conductors ==
- Karel Mark Chichon (b. 1971), chief conductor of the Graz Symphony Orchestra, conductor emeritus of the Latvian National Symphony Orchestra, principal conductor of the European Sinfonietta and artistic director of the Gibraltar Philharmonic Society

== Musicians, bands ==
- Stuart Cavilla (b. 1973), former Breed 77 bassist
- Peter Chichone (b. 1968), former Breed 77 drummer
- Surianne Dalmedo, rock musician and vocalist
- Danny Felice, (b. 1965), former Breed 77 guitarist
- Albert Hammond (b. 1944), singer-songwriter
- Paul Isola, (b. 1972), former Breed 77 vocalist
- Pedro Caparros Lopez, (b. 1975), former Breed 77 guitarist
- John Oates, (b. 1948), of Hall & Oates and a solo artist; American citizen with Gibraltarian father
- Charles Ramirez (b. 1953), professor of guitar at the Royal College of Music
- Taxi, pop rock band

== Painters ==
- Gustavo Bacarisas (1873–1971)
- Willa Vasquez Serfaty (b. 1954)
- Christian Hook (b. 1971)

== Writers ==
- Henry Francis Cary (1772–1844), author and translator, born in Gibraltar.
- Mary Chiappe
- M. G. Sanchez
- Thomas Finlayson, historical researcher and author
- Cecil Street, British Army officer and writer of detective novels. Also wrote as John Rhode, Miles Burton and Cecil Waye
- Jane Clifton (b. 1949), Australian actress, singer, writer and voice artist
- Gregory Burke (1968-), Scottish playwright and screenwriter, raised in Gibraltar, former pupil of Bayside Comprehensive

== Designers ==
- John Galliano (b. 1960), four-time British fashion designer of the year, former head designer of Dior

== Historians ==
- Sam Benady
- Tito Benady (b. 1930)
- Dorothy Ellicott
- Tommy Finlayson (b. 1938)
- George Palao
- Tito Vallejo
- Antonio Zinny (1821–1890), lawyer, journalist and historian. He was especially prominent as a popular historian of Argentina in the first half of the twentieth century and of the Governors of Argentine provinces, the first serious attempt to chronicle the history of the provinces of Argentina.

== Media ==
- Thomas William Bowlby (1818–1860), correspondent for The Times in Germany and China
- Davina Camilleri, Gibraltar Broadcasting Corporation radio and television presenter
- Gerard Teuma, Gibraltar Broadcasting Corporation radio and television presenter
- Arthur Howes (1950–2004), was a documentary film maker and teacher.
- Shaniah Torres, Director and Filmmaker "Clear Focus Studios"

== Military officers ==
- James Henry Craig (1748–1812), British general and colonial administrator active during the Napoleonic Wars; led a successful expedition to capture the Dutch Cape Colony
- Alfred Holmes (1931–1994), sergeant of the Royal Gibraltar Regiment, Gibraltar Barbary macaques, Ape Keeper
- Frederick Stanley Maude KCB CMG DSO (1864–1917), Coldstream Guards General who led the successful campaign in World War I to capture Baghdad over the winter of 1917
- John Montresor (1736–1799), military engineer in the British service active in North America, whose amorous exploits inspired the best-selling novel Charlotte Temple
- William Rooke Creswell KCMG KBE (1855–1933), Vice Admiral, Australian naval officer, commonly considered to be the 'father' of the Royal Australian Navy
- Frederic Creswell DSO (1866–1948), Colonel South African Defence Force. Took part in Boer War and later commanded 8th South African Infantry in WW1. Later Minister of Defence of South Africa 1924–1933.
- Wallace Duffield Wright VC CB CMG DSO (1875–1953), Brigadier. British Army Officer Queen's Royal West Surrey Regiment, awarded the VC for his actions during the Kano-Sokoto Expedition. Elected MP Tavistock 1928–33.
- Edward Bell MC & Bar (1886–1918), Captain. Served in the Football Battalion: the 17th Battalion of the Middlesex Regiment. Footballer with Southampton, Portsmouth and Crystal Palace before WW1.
- James Richard Dacres (1788–1853), Vice-Admiral Royal Navy. Saw service during the Seven Years' War, the American War of Independence and the French Revolutionary and Napoleonic Wars.
- Rear Admiral Sir Home Riggs Popham, KCB, KCH (12 October 1762 – 20 September 1820), was a Royal Navy commander who saw service against the French during the Revolutionary and Napoleonic Wars. He is remembered for his scientific accomplishments, particularly the development of a signal code that was adopted by the Royal Navy in 1803.

== Politicians ==
- Felix Alvarez (b. 1951), founder of the Equality Rights Group
- Keith Azopardi (b. 1967), former leader of the Progressive Democratic Party
- John Beikie (1766–1839), first clerk of the Executive Council of Upper Canada
- Joe Bossano (b. 1939), fourth Chief Minister of Gibraltar
- Adolfo Canepa (b. 1940), third Chief Minister of Gibraltar
- Peter Caruana QC (b. 1956), fifth Chief Minister of Gibraltar
- Daniel Feetham (b. 1967), Leader of the Opposition
- Joseph Garcia PhD (b. 1967), leader of the Liberal Party of Gibraltar
- Charles Gomez (b. 1959), leader of the New Gibraltar Democracy
- Sir Joshua Hassan GBE KCMG LVO (1915–1997), first Chief Minister of Gibraltar
- Peter Isola (1929–2006), former leader of the Democratic Party of British Gibraltar
- Robert Peliza KBE (1920–2011), second Chief Minister of Gibraltar
- Fabian Picardo (b. 1972), sixth Chief Minister of Gibraltar
- Angela Smith, co-founder of the Gibraltar Women's Association
- Dr. Reggie Valarino (1941–2009), former member of the Gibraltar Democratic Movement
- Maurice Xiberras, first leader of the Democratic Party of British Gibraltar
- Frederic Creswell, Labour Party Politician South Africa. Minister of Defence 1924–1933.
- George Tierney (1761–1830), Anglo-Irish Whig politician

== Religious ==
- Peter Emmanuel Amigo (1864–1949), Roman Catholic bishop in the Catholic Church in England and Wales
- Michael George Bowen (1930–2019), prelate of the Roman Catholic Church; served as Archbishop of Southwark and Bishop of Arundel and Brighton
- Charles Caruana (1932–2010), Roman Catholic Bishop of Gibraltar
- Bernard Devlin (1921–2010), Roman Catholic Bishop of Gibraltar
- Mark Miles, priest, Permanent Observer of the Holy See to the Organization of American States
- Edward Stevenson (1820–1897), prominent Mormon missionary and served as a General Authority in the Church of Jesus Christ of Latter-day Saints

== Scientists ==
- Barry Azzopardi (b. 1947), chemical engineer specialising in multiphase flow research; Lady Trent Professor of Chemical Engineering at the University of Nottingham
- Clive Finlayson MBE (b. 1955), zoologist, paleoanthropologist and paleontologist; Director Chief Scientist and Curator at the Gibraltar Museum; Director of the Gorham's Cave Complex UNESCO World Heritage Site
- Geraldine Finlayson GA, managing director of the Gibraltar Museum
- William George Penney OM KBE (1909–1991), physicist responsible for the development of British nuclear technology following World War II

== Sportspeople ==
- Ellie Allen, Irish rugby union footballer
- Allen Bula, football manager
- Ethan Britto, footballer
- Jeremy Campbell-Lamerton, Scottish rugby union footballer
- Eva Carneiro, sports medicine specialist
- Amanda Carreras, tennis player
- Dominic Carroll, track and field athlete
- Kyle Casciaro, footballer
- Jayce Asquez, footballer
- Lee Casciaro, footballer
- Ryan Casciaro, footballer
- Georgina Cassar, rhythmic gymnast
- Joseph Chipolina, footballer
- Roy Chipolina, footballer
- Tjay De Barr, footballer
- Peter Dignan (1955–2013), rower
- Dylan Duo (b. 1977), darts player
- Pepe Forbes (1917–2013), boxing matchmaker
- Danny Higginbotham, former footballer
- Antony Lopez (b. 1987), darts player
- Tony Macedo (b. 1938), football goalkeeper (Fulham Football Club, 1957–1968)
- Dyson Parody (b. 1984), darts player
- Norcady Reyes (b. 2003), athletics competitor
- Liam Walker, footballer
- Henry Wheeler (1840–1908), cricketer
- Scott Wiseman, footballer
- Alison Nicholas MBE is an English professional golfer with 4 LPGA tour wins.
- Arthur Forman (1850–1905), cricketer who played for Derbyshire between 1877 and 1882.

== Various ==
- Kaiane Aldorino (b. 1986), Miss Gibraltar and Miss World 2009, incumbent Mayoress
- Aaron Cardozo, consul for Tunis and Algiers
- Maroua Kharbouch (b. 1990), Miss Gibraltar 2013
- David Pacifico (1784–1854), known as Don Pacifico, key figure in the international crisis known as the Don Pacifico affair
- Nicholas Reed (b. 1963), Oscar winning film producer and Adidas leg model.
- Mariola Summerfield (1927–2021), women's rights activist
- Charles Trico Gibraltar's First LGBTQ+ Activist
- Paul Perez The Gibraltar LGBTQ+ Committee Chair

== People of Gibraltarian descent ==
- Dan Anahory (b. 1993), entrepreneur
- Imperio Argentina (1906–2003), singer and actress
- Reynaldo Bignone(1928–2018), Argentine general who served as 41st President of Argentina from 1 July 1982 to 10 December 1983. In 2010, he was sentenced to 25 years in prison for his role in the kidnapping, torture, and murder of persons suspected of opposing the government during the Dirty War.
- John Oates (b. 1948), musician best known as half of the rock and soul duo Hall & Oates, with Daryl Hall
- Jo Frost (b. 1970), nanny and TV personality
- Albert Hammond Jr. (b. 1980), guitarist
- Rita Hayworth (1918–1987), born Margarita Cansino, Hollywood actress
- Michelle Keegan (b. 1987), actress known for her roles as Tina McIntyre in the ITV soap opera Coronation Street and Corporal Georgie Lane in the BBC drama series Our Girl.

== People born in Gibraltar during the Spanish period ==
Prior to its capture in 1704 by the British, there were 4,000 inhabitants of Gibraltar, all but 70 of whom fled to the surrounding Campo de Gibraltar. Some notable people born in Gibraltar prior to British rule include:

- Diego de Astorga y Céspedes (1663–1734), Catholic Archbishop of Toledo and Grand Inquisitor
- Alonso Hernández del Portillo (1543–1624), first historian of Gibraltar
- Juan Mateos (?–1594), founder of Gibraltar's first hospital
- Gonzalo Piña Ludueña (1545–1600), Spanish conquistador in Venezuela; founder of Venezuelan town of San Antonio de Gibraltar in 1592
- Juan Romero de Figueroa (1646–1720), Spanish Catholic priest in charge of the church of St. Mary the Crowned when the town was captured in 1704
- Simón Susarte, Spanish goatherd who guided a Spanish contingent over the Rock in the 1704 Franco-Spanish siege

== People of Gibraltar descent (prior to British rule) ==
- Luis Daoíz (1767–1808), one of the heroes of the Dos de Mayo Uprising

== See also ==
- Demographics of Gibraltar
- Gibraltarians
- Gibraltarian status
- History of nationality in Gibraltar
