= Tommy Finlayson =

Gibraltarian historian, cricketer, and archivist

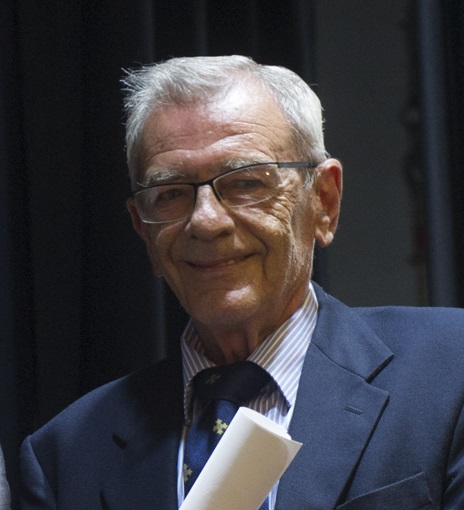
- Tommy Finlayson in 2015
- Born: Thomas James Finlayson; 1 May 1938 (age 88); Gibraltar
- Citizenship: British
- Education: Gibraltar Grammar School
- Alma mater: University of Edinburgh
- Occupations: Teacher archivist cricketer
- Employer: Government of Gibraltar
- Known for: Literary works on the history of Gibraltar; Chairman of the Gibraltar Cricket Association
- Notable work: The Fortress Came First
- Children: 2 daughters
- Relatives: Clive Finlayson (brother), Director of the Gibraltar Museum
- Awards: Member of the Order of the British Empire; ICC Lifetime Service Award (2008)

Thomas James Finlayson MBE, commonly known as Tommy Finlayson (Gibraltar, 1 May 1938), is a Gibraltarian historian. He is also a former cricketer and archivist of the Gibraltar Archives.

He is the eldest brother of Clive Finlayson, the director of the Gibraltar Museum.

== Early life ==
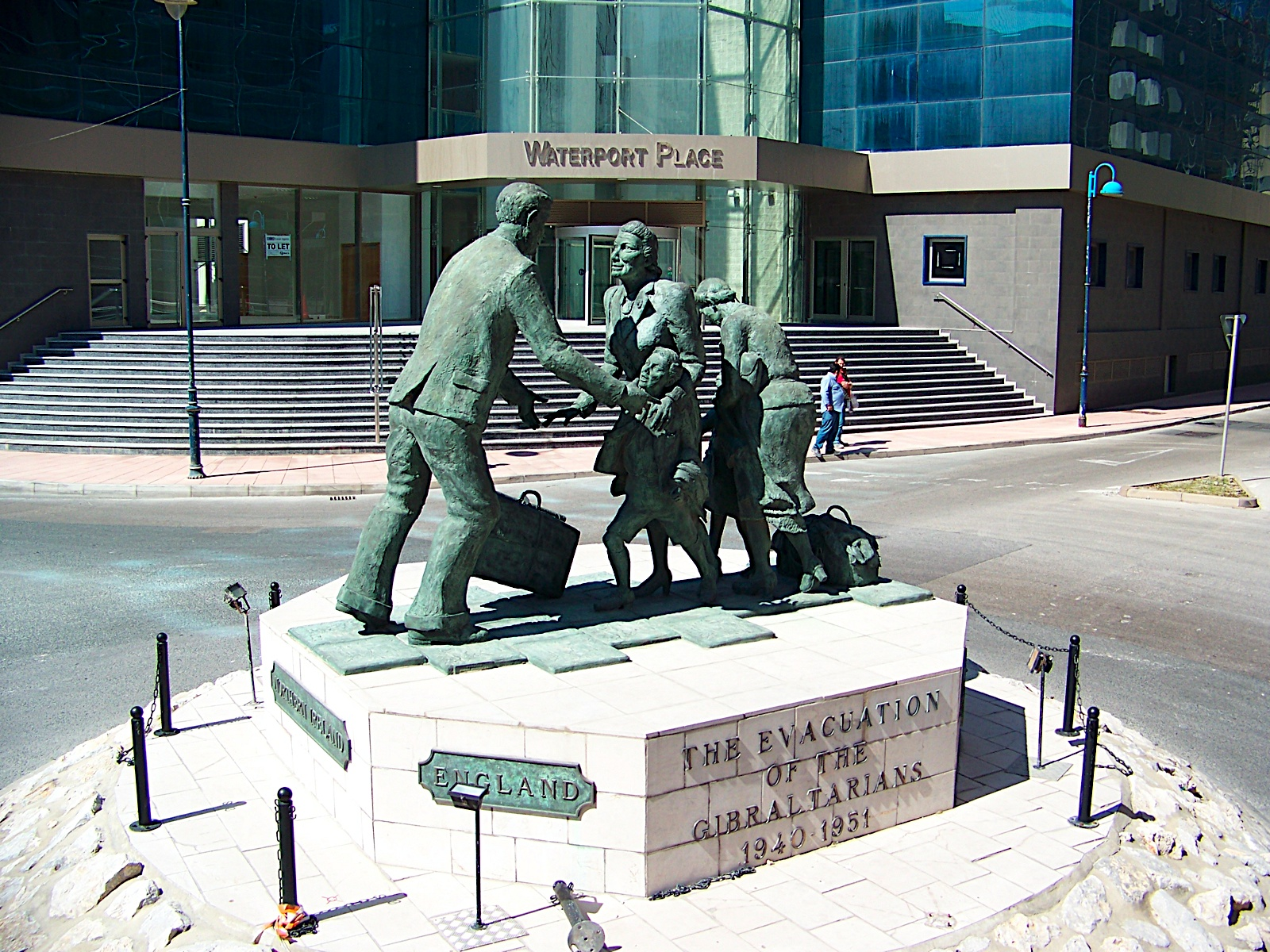
Monument to The Evacuation of the Gibraltarians at Waterport Road, Gibraltar.

Tommy Finlayson was born in Gibraltar on 1 May 1938. His family, of Scottish descent, have been established on The Rock since the early 19th century. When World War II broke out he was evacuated, as was most of the civilian population of Gibraltar, with his family across the strait to French Morocco. Only a few weeks later, following the defeat of France and the armistice with Germany, the French authorities expelled the evacuees which the War Office then decided to transfer to London via Gibraltar. Finlayson and his family were taken to London aboard the Athlone Castle in July 1940. They lived in the Evacuee Centre at the Empire Pool in Wembley until they were once again relocated to a camp in County Antrim, Northern Ireland in 1944. Still a young boy, Finlayson attended the Gibraltar Grammar School following his repatriation to The Rock, once the war had ended. He later studied at the University of Edinburgh where he obtained an honours MA in history.

== Professional career ==
Finlayson later opted for a career in teaching, which he pursued in the United Kingdom and continued in Gibraltar upon his return in 1980. In 1985, after 25 years of teaching, he was appointed archivist at the Gibraltar Archives by the Government of Gibraltar. He maintained this position from the 1980s to the early 2000s. At the same time, he wrote a number of books and articles on the contemporary history of Gibraltar. The most notable being The Fortress Came First. The story of the civilian population of Gibraltar during the Second World War (1990), which was described as "the definitive work on the wartime evacuation of Gibraltarian civilians". In 1993 he was awarded the MBE in the Queen's Birthday honours for his contribution to knowledge of the history of Gibraltar. In 2015 he was appointed Honorary Fellow of the Gibraltar Museum and was also awarded Gibraltar's Medallion of Distinction for his services in recording the history of Gibraltar.

=== Historical works ===
His works have been devoted to the contemporary history of Gibraltar:

- Finlayson, T.J. (1990). The Fortress Came First. The story of the civilian population of Gibraltar during the Second World War. United Kingdom: Gibraltar Books Ltd. ISBN 978-0-948466-12-0.
- Finlayson, T.J. (1996). Stories from the Rock. Gibraltar.
- Finlayson, T.J. Gibraltar Gives Thanks V.E. Day.
- T J Finlayson Gibraltar Military Fortress or Commercial Colony 2011 |
- T J Finlayson Gibraltar and the Spanish Shadow 2014
- T J Finlayson The boundaries of Gibraltar 2018

== Cricket ==
Finlayson has also taken an active part in Gibraltar cricket; as a player, Secretary and formerly Chairman of the Gibraltar Cricket Association. In March 2009 he received the 2008 Lifetime Service Award by International Cricket Council Europe in recognition of his services to cricket in Gibraltar.
