= Charles Gomez =

Gibraltarian lawyer and politician

Charles A. Gomez
- Born: 23 April 1959 (age 67); Gibraltar
- Education: Gibraltar Grammar School; University College Buckland; University of London; Inner Temple.
- Occupation: Barrister
- Known for: 2007 Gibraltar general election
- Political party: New Gibraltar Democracy
- Board member of: Parliamentary Commission on Democratic & Political Reform; Honorary Professor of the Department of International Law and Relations, University of Cádiz; Chairman of the Safeguarding Commission of the Diocese of Gibraltar.
- Spouse: Susan L. Saywell
- Children: Nicolas, Christopher & Lilly.
- Website: http://www.lawequitygibraltar.com/

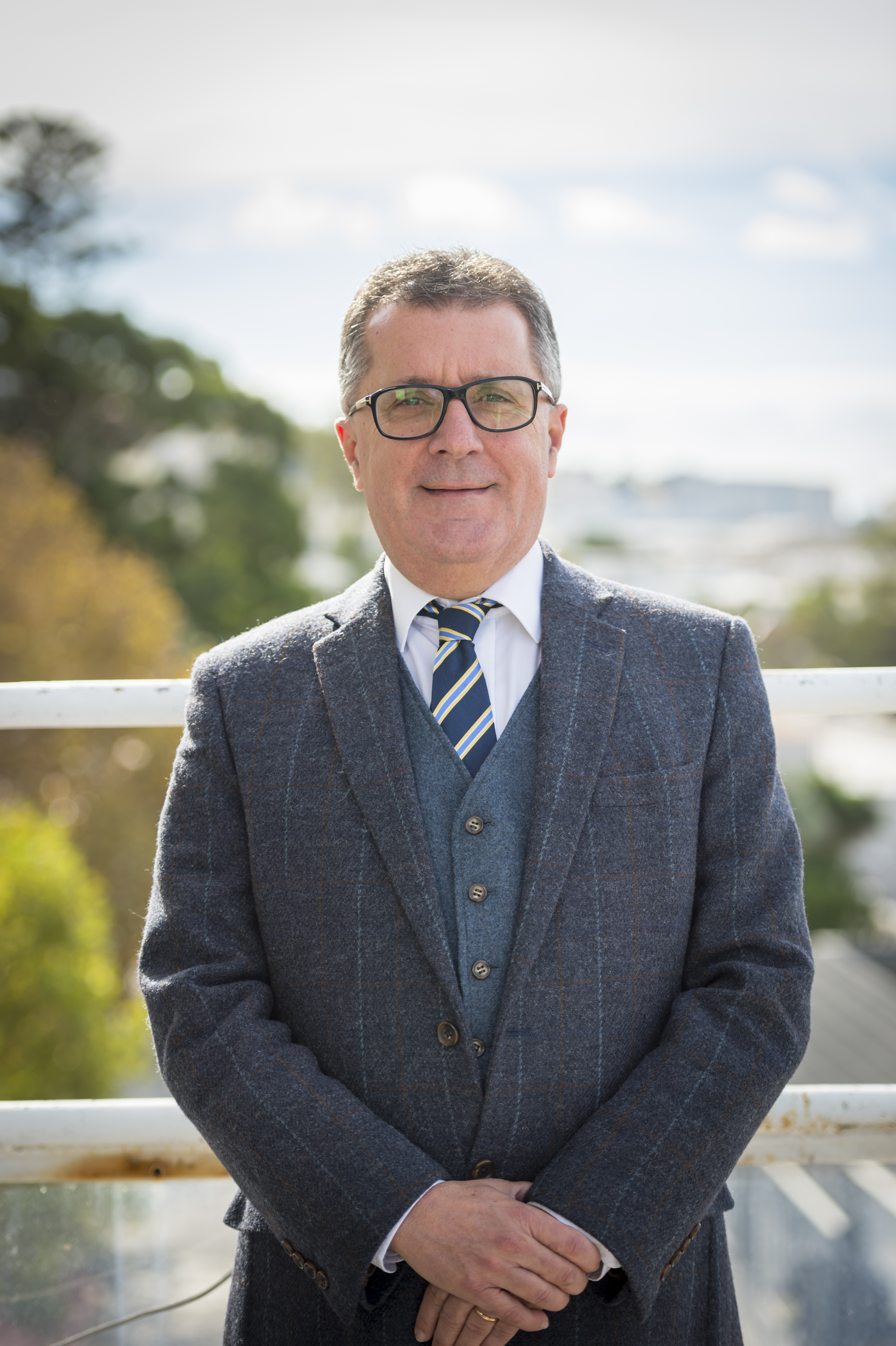
Charles Gomez Gibraltar Barrister

Charles A. Gomez is a Gibraltarian lawyer, Principal Barrister of Charles Gomez & Company, politician, Leader of the right of centre New Gibraltar Democracy (NGD) Party and an Honorary Professor of International Law at the University of Cadiz.

== Biography ==
Charles Gomez was born in Gibraltar on 23 April 1959 and was called to the Bars of England, Wales and Gibraltar in 1982.

Before qualifying as a Barrister, Charles worked as a baker, a journalist and a barman.

He is an Honorary Professor of International Law and International Relations of the University of Cádiz and a member of the Key Advisory Group for Law at the University of Gibraltar. Charles lectures regularly in Spain, Morocco and Gibraltar.

He is the Chairman of the Safeguarding Commission of the Catholic Diocese of Gibraltar and is the Director for Aid to the Church in Need charity in Gibraltar.

== Career ==
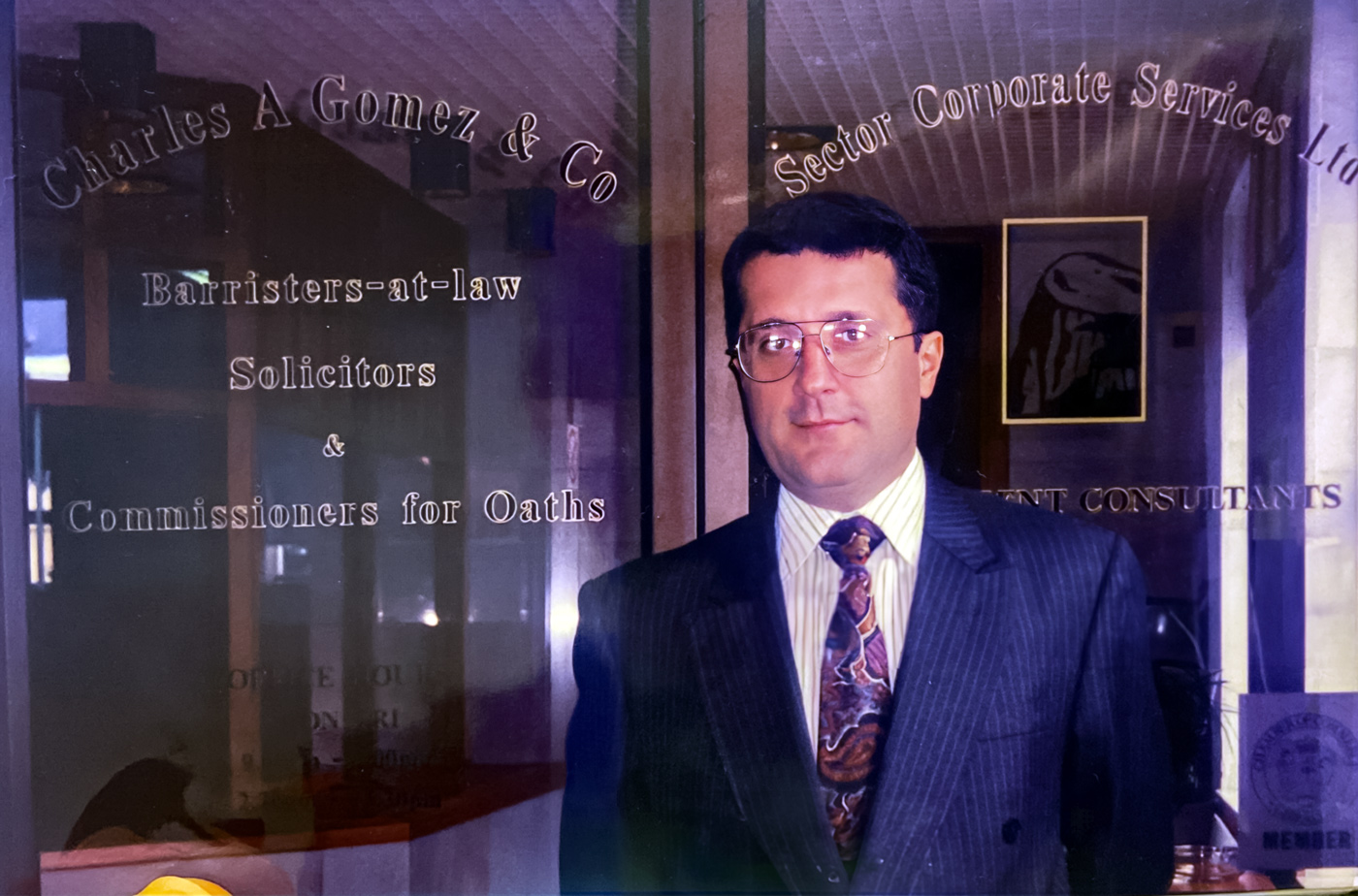

He was retained by the suspended Chief Justice of Gibraltar, Derek Schofield, in proceedings for the removal of Gibraltar's senior judge heard by the Judicial Committee of the Privy Council in London which resulted in a 4/3 split of that court in a decision handed down on 12 November 2009. The decision is considered to be a major precedent in the field of judicial independence in the United Kingdom and the Commonwealth.

Charles Gomez was a prominent member and spokesman of the "No vote" campaign for the 2006 constitution referendum on Gibraltar's current Constitution. He currently concentrates on his career as a barrister known for his involvement in complex cases including transnational cases, notably in defamation. In conjunction with the University of Cadiz, Spain he has since 2013 organized English law initiation lectures for Spanish undergraduates.

In 2015, Charles Gomez became the first Gibraltarian in history to be appointed as an Honorary Professor at a Spanish university, at the University of Cádiz.

== Other work ==
For several years in the 1990s he wrote a weekly piece in the newsweekly Vox, and was at one time heavily involved in powerboat racing having organised Royal Yachting Association and Union Internationale Motonautique events in Gibraltar. He is a commentator on local Gibraltarian affairs and occasional participant in university seminars and TV debates. In 2015 he was appointed an honorary professor of law by the University of Cadiz.

Charles Gomez also writes a weekly column, "Brief", for the Olive Press newspaper (Gibraltar and Spanish editions) which takes a legal analysis of the Brexit situation in Gibraltar. He is also one of the promoters of the Reach-Alcance newspaper.

== See also ==
- List of Gibraltarians
- Politics of Gibraltar
