= M. G. Sanchez =

Gibraltarian writer

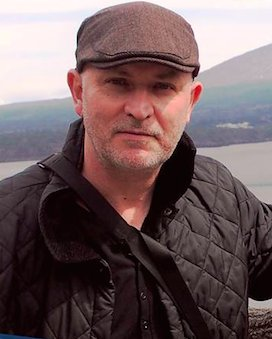
- Writing career
- Notable works: Border Control and other Autobiographical Pieces (2019); Gooseman (2020)

M. G. Sanchez is a Gibraltarian writer who has written over a dozen books on Gibraltarian identity. His works have been reviewed in literary journals in Europe and the United Kingdom and he has lectured at many universities.

== Background ==
Born in Gibraltar in 1968, Sanchez attended primary and secondary schools in the territory. Sanchez represented Gibraltar at international level in his youth, coming 139th in the 1985 IAAF World Cross Country Championships – Junior men's race. In 1995, Sanchez moved to the United Kingdom to study English Literature at the University of Leeds. He received a PhD in English literature a doctoral thesis on subject of anti-Spanish sentiment in Elizabethan literary and political writing. Sanchez is a resident of the United Kingdom, but he also made long visits to New Zealand (2004), India (2005‒2008) and Japan (2014‒2016). In November 2020 he was awarded the Cultural Ambassador Award at the Gibraltar Government's annual culture awards.

== Literary career ==
Writing in the New Statesman in early 2015, Sanchez stated that his intention as a writer and speaker was "to present a Gibraltar that feels more real and more tangible than the “contested territory" cliché that readers so often encounter in newspaper editorials." His book Past: A Memoir (2016) relates hardships his family endured during the 2013 Gibraltar border dispute between Spain and the United Kingdom. Sanchez also describes a walk he took in Gibraltar's Upper Town Area with the historian Nicholas Rankin.

Articles about Sanchez's work have appeared in British and American Studies, Il Tolomeo, Ariel, ES Review, Miscelánea: A Journal of English and American Studies, the Kervan International Journal of Afro-Asiatic Studies, the International Journal of Iberian Studies, the Journal of Mediterranean Studies, the Open Library of Humanities, as well as in books such as Ritorno a Babele: esercizi di globalizzazione and (Post)Colonial Passages: Incursions and Excursion Across the Literatures and Cultures in English.

Sanchez has lectured at the University of Salamanca, the University of Turin, the University of the Balearic Islands, the University of Portsmouth, the University of Strasbourg, the University of Barcelona, the University of Northumbria, the University of Granada, the University of Lisbon, the University of Gibraltar, the University of Malta, and King's College London. For an appearance at the University of Basel, Sanchez wrote an autobiographical piece entitled 'Fifty Years of Unbelonging.' He also participated in the 2017 Gibraltar International Literary Festival, delivering a talk entitled 'Representing Gibraltarianness,.' During the 2018 event, Sanchez discussed his book Bombay Journal.

In December 2020 Sanchez was invited by the University of Barcelona to deliver the 21st annual Doireann MacDermott Lecture. His talk – 'Between the Colonial and the Postcolonial: Writing and the Creation of a Third-Space Identity' – was subsequently published in a special issue of Coolablah, the official journal of the Australian and Transnational Studies Centre at the Universitat de Barcelona.

Sanchez has also taken part in radio programmes, including the Australian Broadcasting Corporation show Late Night Live, the BBC World Service's The Cultural Frontline and Lletres Ebrenques with Emigdi Subirats i Sebastià.

=== Rock Scorpion Books ===
In 2006 Sanchez co-founded Rock Scorpion Books, an independent publishing company that was run from the United Kingdom. Rock Scorpion Books specialised in publishing fiction and non-fiction which raised awareness about the British overseas territory of Gibraltar, which Sanchez had been told there was no market. The company ceased to exist in 2013. Several of their former titles are currently published by Createspace International. Works released through the company include Sanchez's Rock Black and Sam Benady's The Pearls of Morocco: Bresciano in Africa.

== Bibliography ==
=== Publications ===
- Rock of Empire (2001)
- Rock Black: Ten Gibraltarian Stories (2006)
- Writing the Rock of Gibraltar: An Anthology of Literary Texts, 1720–1890 (2006)
- The Prostitutes of Serruya's Lane and other Hidden Histories (2007)
- Diary of a Victorian Colonial and other Tales (2008)
- Georgian and Victorian Gibraltar: Incredible Eyewitness Accounts (2012)
- The Escape Artist (2013)
- Solitude House (2015)
- Jonathan Gallardo (2015)
- Past: A Memoir (2016)
- Bombay Journal (2018)
- Crossed Lines (2019)
- Border Control and other Autobiographical Pieces (2019)
- Gooseman (2020)
- The Fetishist (2021)
- Marlboro Man (2022)

=== Critical bibliography ===
- Sarah M. Abas, 'M. G. Sanchez: an Interview,' ES Review 39, 2018, pp. 319–330.
- Esterino Adami, 'La Rocca di Babele: narrazioni e trasformazioni linguistiche in M. G. Sanchez,' Ritorno a Babele: prove di globalizzazione (Turin: Neos Terrenia, 2013), pp. 71–81.
- Esterino Adami, 'An Interview with Gibraltarian author M. G. Sanchez followed by a review of The Escape Artist,' Il Tolomeo 13, 2013, pp. 29–36.
- Esterino Adami, 'Recensione di Jonathan Gallardo,' Il Tolomeo 18, 2016, pp. 233–35.
- Esterino Adami, 'Recensione di Solitude House,' Il Tolomeo 17, 2015, pp. 185–187.
- Esterino Adami, 'A Passage to Gibraltar: Alterity and Representation in M. G. Sanchez,' Postcolonial Passages: incursions and excursions across the literatures and cultures in English (Cambridge: Cambridge Scholars Publishing, 2018), pp. 204–214.
- Christine Berberich, 'Review of Gooseman,' Wasafiri 111, 3, pp. 116–118.
- Isabel Alonso Breto, 'Review of Border Control and other Autobiographical Pieces,' Complutense Journal of English Studies 28, 2020, pp. 229–231.
- Isabel Alonso Breto, 'An interview with Gibraltarian author Mark G. Sanchez, ariel: A Review of International English 52, 3–4, 2021, pp. 249–261.
- Miriam Fernández Santiago, 'Review of Gooseman', Journal of Mediterranean Studies 31, 1, 2021, pp. 127–128.
- Rebecca Gabay, 'M. G. Sanchez's Bombay Journal: Redressing the Past from the Colonial Present,' Kervan International Journal of Afro-Asiatic Studies 22, 2018, pp. 291–294.
- Amanda Gerke, 'Discursive Boundaries: Code-Switching as Representative of Gibraltarian Identity Construction in M. G. Sanchez's Rock Black,' Miscelánea 57, 2018 pp. 35–57.
- Ina Habermann, 'British-European Entanglements: M.G. Sanchez's The Escape Artist and the Case of Gibraltar,' Journal for Literary and Intermedial Crossings 2, 2018, pp. b1-20.
- Ina Habermann, 'Gibraltarian Hauntologies: Spectres of Colonialism in the Fiction of M. G. Sanchez', Open Library of Humanities 6, 1, 2020, p. 19.
- Ina Habermann, 'Something rotten in the state of Gibraltar: M. G. Sanchez's Autobiographical Explorations of borderlands', Mediterranean Studies 30, 2, 2022, pp. 163–176.
- Jan M. Heller, 'Rozhovor s Markem G. Sanchezem: Jsme slitina všech kovů,' iTvar – obtýdeník živé literatury, 14, 2024, pp. 4–6.
- Ana Maria Manzanas Calvo, 'The Line and the Limit of Britishness: The Construction of Gibraltarian Identity in M. G. Sanchez's Writing,' ES Review 38, 2017, pp. 27–45.
- Robert Patrick Newcomb, 'Review of Border Control and Other Autobiographical Pieces', International Journal of Iberian Studies 33, 1, 2020, pp. 107–108.
- Robert Patrick Newcomb, 'Review of Gooseman', Hispania 104, 4, 2021, pp. 750–751.
- Alastair Niven, 'Celebrating an Abundance, 1984–2019: Thirty-five Literary Highlights from Aotearoa to Zimbabwe', Wasafiri 34, 4, pp.133–138.
- Elena Seoane, 'Telling the true Gibraltarian Story: an interview with Gibraltarian writer M. G. Sanchez,' Alicante Journal of English Studies 29, 2016, pp. 251–258
- John A. Stotesbury, 'Mediterranean Gothic: M. G. Sanchez's Gibraltar Fiction in its Context,' British and American Studies 21, 2016, pp. 156–172.
