= Gerard Teuma =

Gibraltarian journalist

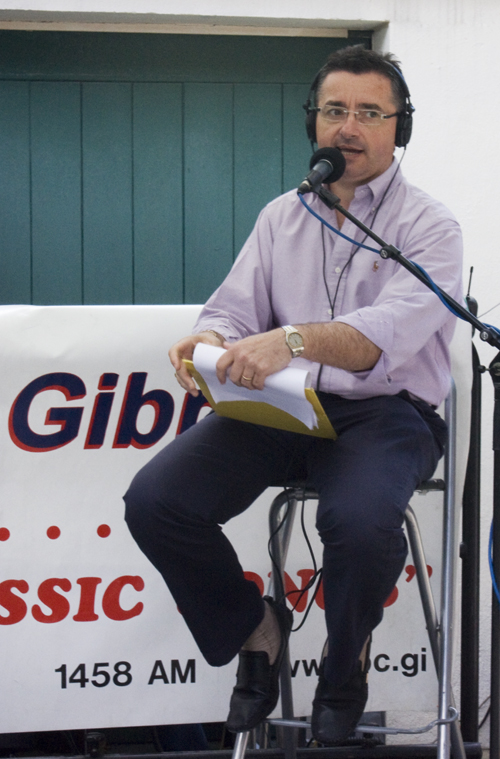
- Teuma at a Radio Gibraltar roadshow during the Gibraltar Museum open day, May 2010.
- Born: Gibraltar
- Occupations: Presenter/journalist (1984–2005), head of radio gibraltar (2005–2012), chief executive (2012–2022). broadcast management consultant & freelance presenter/commentator (2022–present)
- Years active: 1984–present
- Employer: Gibraltar Broadcasting Corporation
- Children: 3

Gerard Teuma is a Gibraltarian radio/television presenter and broadcast executive. He has been one of the regular voices on Radio Gibraltar since 1984. During that time he has also been attached for short periods to broadcasting organisations in the United Kingdom, including BBC Radio Leicester and the Commonwealth Broadcasting Association in London.

After several years presenting and producing a variety of radio programmes, including the Breakfast Show, Teuma was promoted to Senior Broadcast Journalist in GBC News. He held the position for nine years during which time he reported on Gibraltar political issues both locally and from the United Nations in New York, Downing Street in London and the Foreign Ministry in Madrid.

In 2005, Teuma was appointed as Head of Radio of the Gibraltar Broadcasting Corporation, relaunching Radio Gibraltar with a tighter music format of latest hits and classic songs and more dynamic presentation style.

As a presenter, Gerard Teuma anchored GBC News/Newswatch between 1988 and 2012, as well as most major broadcasts during that period including General and European Elections, referendums and significant commentary events. In addition, he presented the TV programmes, ‘Brainbox’, ‘A Matter of Fact’, ‘The Agenda’, ‘Viewpoint’, ‘National Night’ and ‘Take a Break’. On Radio, Teuma hosted ‘My Country’ (2002–2012) and ‘Lunchtime Live’ (2005–2012).

Gerard Teuma was appointed chief executive officer of Gibraltar Broadcasting Corporation in 2012, holding the position for 10 years till his retirement from GBC in 2022. The appointment came when GBC was in all probability at its lowest ebb in its then 50-year history. Having negotiated a higher level of funding from the Gibraltar Government, he was able to transform GBC TV from an underperforming service to a channel offering a wide mix of quality local productions and top international programming. It included the recruitment of a large number of additional staff and the migration from unsuitable premises to a new media centre comprising two television studios and four radio studios among other broadcast facilities.

As CEO, Gerard Teuma represented GBC at the international public broadcasters organisation, Public Media Alliance. He was elected on to the PMA Board in 2018, where he served as Vice-President between 2019 and 2021.

Gerard Teuma became synonymous with GBC's charity, GBC Open Day, which he took over in 1988 when its future was in doubt due to declining revenues and interest. By creating new related community events and lobbying the business community, he grew the GBC Open Day to become the largest community-wide fund raising effort in Gibraltar, raising over 3.5 million pounds for worthy causes between 1988 and 2021.

Upon his retirement from GBC in 2022, Gerard Teuma has taken on new challenges in the international media space, and can now be heard on the English-speaking Belgian-based global radio station 100%Retro
