= John Beikie =

Upper Canada politician

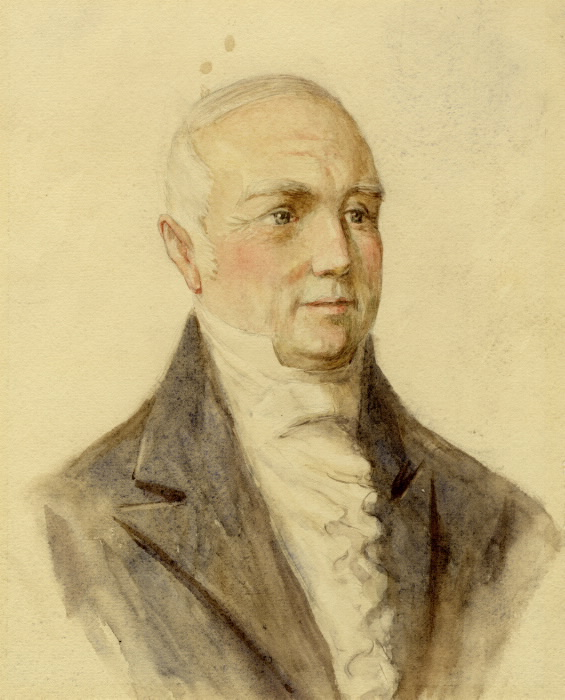
- Born: February 14, 1766; Gibraltar
- Died: March 20, 1839 (aged 73); Toronto

Lt. Col. John Beikie (February 14, 1766 – March 20, 1839) was a merchant and political figure in Upper Canada.

== Biography ==
He was born of Scottish parents in Gibraltar in 1766. He settled in Cornwall in 1794 and was named justice of the peace in the Eastern District in 1796. He moved to York (Toronto) in 1801 where he lived on the north side of Front Street east of Spadina Avenue where Windsor Street now stands. Rev. Dr. Henry Scadding describes him as a tall, upright, staidly moving man who was usually seen in a long snuff-coloured overcoat and, also, as one of the dramatis personae of York. He served in the local militia during the War of 1812 and was actively engaged in the defence of York against the American invaders in 1813 and was held by them as a hostage. His wife, Penelope, was one of the few who held fast in her home to keep off American looters. From 1810 to 1815 John Beikie was Sheriff of York and, as such, he probably was the first to complain of wretched conditions in York Gaol; a protest repeated by Sir William Campbell and many others over the years. Beikie represented Stormont and Glengarry in the Legislative Assembly of Upper Canada from 1812 to 1816. He was clerk of the Executive Council from 1820 to 1825 and was named justice of the peace in the Home District in 1822. He became Lieutenant Colonel of the militia in 1826.

John Beikie was a Freemason and one of the founding members of St. Andrew's Lodge. He was Master from 1825 - 1828.

He died in Toronto in 1839.

== See also ==
- List of Gibraltarians
