= Gibraltar National Archives =

- National Archives
- Coat of arms of the Government of Gibraltar

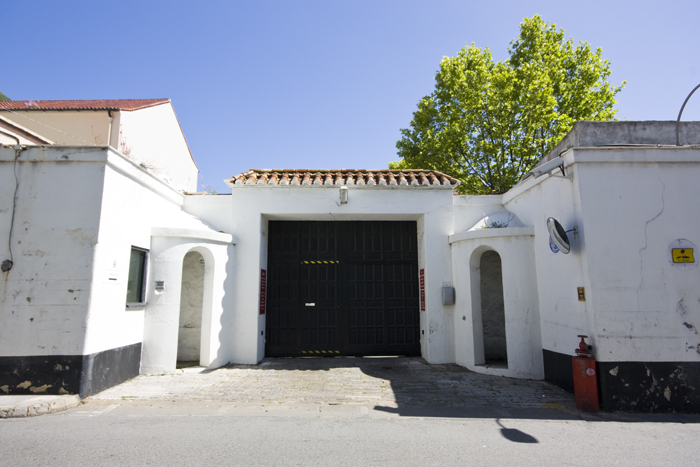
- The entrance to the Gibraltar National Archives in Governor's Lane, Gibraltar.

Agency overview
- Formed: 1969
- (etc.)
- Jurisdiction: Government of Gibraltar
- Headquarters: Governor's Lane, Gibraltar; 36.137233°N 5.353913°W
- Minister responsible: The Right Honourable Dr. Joseph Garcia MP, Deputy Chief Minister of Gibraltar; (etc.)
- Agency executive: Gerrard Wood, Archivist & Head; (etc.)
- Child agencies: (etc.)
- Website: nationalarchives.gi

The Gibraltar National Archives is a department of the Government of Gibraltar under the responsibility of the Ministry of the Deputy Chief Minister of Gibraltar.

The National Archives were established in 1969 following Gibraltar's first constitution. The institution is responsible not only for the collection and preservation of public records, but for providing access to the records that may be released to the public and to academic researchers in those cases where records can be released.

Besides public records, historical records from the 16^{th} to 21^{st} centuries are also deposited in the Gibraltar National Archives. Such records were donated for bodies and institutions that took part in any way in the administration of Gibraltar. Private individuals, groups and associations have also donated records to the Gibraltar National Archives. An example is the complete historical collection of the Panorama (Gibraltar) newspaper which was donated in December 2024.

== See also ==
- Gibraltar National Museum
