= Geraldine Finlayson =

Gibraltarian historian

Prof. Geraldine Finlayson GMD
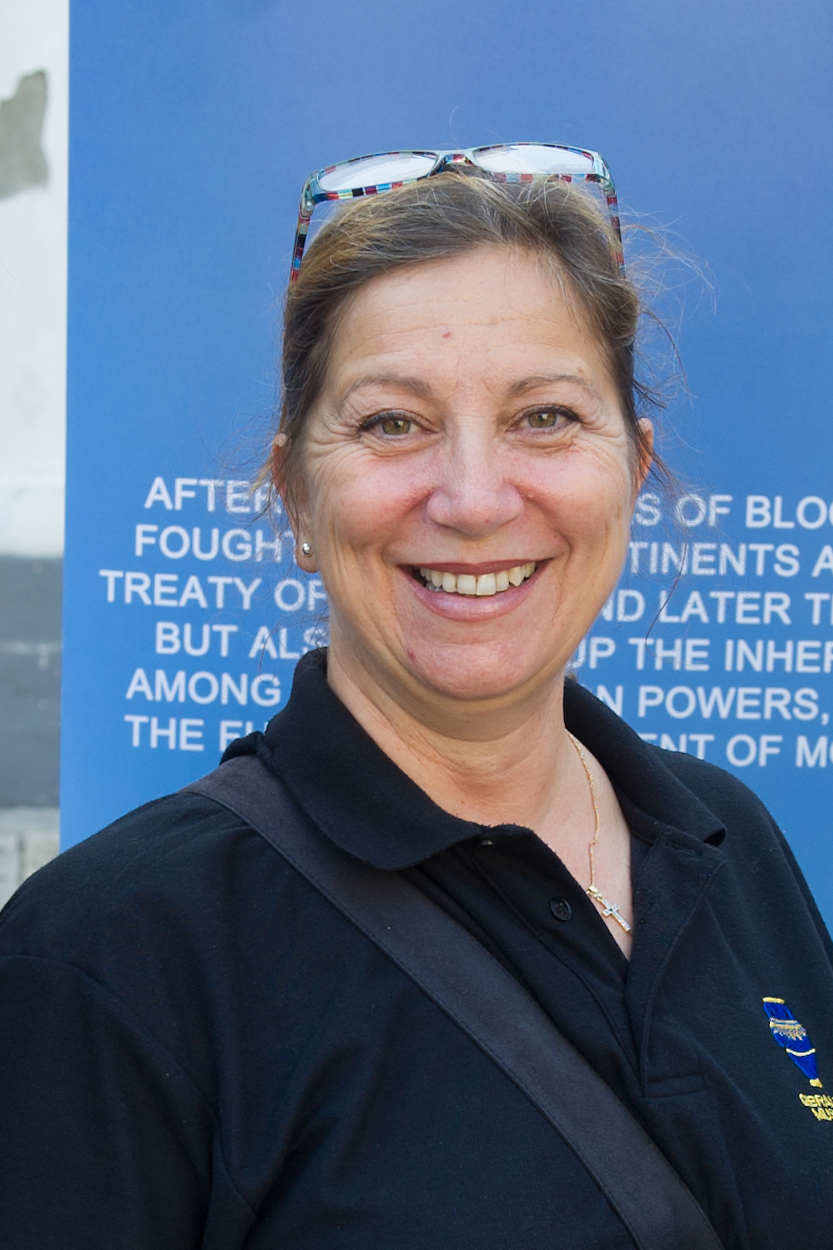
- Geraldine Finlayson at John Mackintosh Square during the tercentenary commemoration of the Treaty of Utrecht, 13 July 2013
- Born: 20 July 1960 (age 66); Gibraltar
- Education: Anglia Ruskin University
- Known for: Chief Laboratory Scientist of the Gibraltar Museum
- Spouse: Professor Clive Finlayson
- Scientific career
- Workplaces: Gibraltar Museum
- Thesis: Climate, vegetation and biodiversity: a multiscale study of the south of the Iberian Peninsula (2006)

Geraldine Finlayson (born 20 July 1960) is a Gibraltarian scientist and CEO of the Gibraltar National Museum. She was director of the John Mackintosh Hall until October 2011. She has played a major role in developing the "Gibraltar method" of archaeological research, especially that carried out underwater, and is one of a team of scientists who have made major discoveries about the nature of Neanderthal culture.

== Early life and education ==
Finlayson was born in Gibraltar and attended Gibraltar Girls Comprehensive School.

Finlayson earned her PhD in 2006 by the Anglia Ruskin University, Cambridge, UK, where she presented the thesis "Climate, vegetation and biodiversity: a multiscale study of the south of the Iberian Peninsula."

== Career ==
She worked in the civil service of the Government of Gibraltar from 1981 to 1993. For many years, Finlayson has studied the presence of Neanderthals in Gibraltar, having performed several excavations in the region, including underwater.

Finlayson was Director of the John Mackintosh Hall from 1993 to 2011. During that time she oversaw a great many public functions, including conferences, exhibitions, and concerts.

She is currently the CEO of the Gibraltar National Museum.

She is also Director of the Underwater Research Unit (URU), the activities of which include surveying the seabed and caves for the Gibraltar Caves Project, conducting a comprehensive survey of Gibraltar's Submerged Heritage for the Heritage Database, and carrying out wreck surveys and pre-disturbance surveys on archaeological sites.

She is a qualified diver and diving instructor, a tutor with the Nautical Archaeology Society, and at the Gibraltar National Museum.

=== Research interests ===
Finlayson's research interests include the relationship among climate, vegetation, landscape features and biodiversity; the spatio-temporal distribution patterns of vegetation and animals, focusing mainly on the Southern Iberian Peninsula and the Quaternary; the cultural influences on the development of "Gibraltarian cuisine"; and the study of Gilbraltar's "underwater cultural heritage."

== Other professional activities ==
Finlayson gave a talk entitled "The John Mackintosh Hall – 40 years on" on 13 April 2004, about the cultural and sports venue in Gibraltar.

At the sixth Iberian Quaternary Congress in 2006, Finlayson "presented an innovative method in which she reconstructed in fine detail the habitat of the Neanderthals outside Gorham’s Cave".

In 2008, Finlayson, along with Prof. Clive Finlayson and Dr Darren Fa, visited Malta at the invitation of that nation's Superintendents of Cultural Heritage. The team examined an archaeological dig and provided advice on the work underway. They also discussed a possible long-term collaborative project applying the Gibraltar model to the Maltese islands.

Geraldine and Clive Finlayson gave a lecture on human evolution at the University of Granada in 2009. The lecture, entitled "The Luck of Man: the role of historical contingency in human evolution", traced the history of the evolution of Homo sapiens.

In November 2010, Finlayson gave a lecture at the Annual Conference of the Nautical Archaeological Society (NAS) held at Portsmouth University in the UK. Her presentation concerned "the Gibraltar Method", which had been developed by her and teammates in Gibraltar and which was now central to "the study and protection of submerged heritage".

Finlayson made a guest appearance as herself, in the episode 48 ("Das dunkle Geheimnis der Neandertaler", 2012) of the first season of the Austrian television series Terra Mater.

Finlayson gave a lecture in 2012 in Gibraltar as part of the series "Hidden Worlds and Our Intangible Heritage."

Finlayson gave representatives of the media a tour of Gorham's Cave during the annual expert exploration thereof in 2012.

=== "Lost world in Gibraltar" ===
Finlayson was one of the authors of a paper by "Key to a lost world in Gibraltar", that was published in 2013 in Geomorphology. She explained to journalists that Gibraltar was once "a Mediterranean Serengeti" where "deer, wild horse and cattle grazed on the savannahs and were stalked by a strange mix of predators that included Spotted Hyaenas, Leopards, Brown Bears, Wolves and Lynxes. This was truly a bit of Africa in Europe". Along with two earlier 2013 papers, this was described by Finlayson as ”a remarkable output of scientific literature for such a small institution as the Gibraltar Museum, comparable to the best research centres in European and North American universities....We have been working very hard to make Gibraltar a Centre of Excellence and we are getting there. We are grateful to the support that HM Government of Gibraltar has given us and we are optimistic that, with this backing, we can take Gibraltar to yet another level".

=== Neanderthals' cognitive capacity ===
In September 2012, the Gibraltar Museum team, led by Clive Finlayson and including Geraldine Finlayson, published a paper in the journal PLOS One, "Birds of a feather", which argued that “Neanderthals had cognitive capacity which permitted them to think symbolically possibly by the use of ornamentation." This was described by Clive Finlayson as "a huge step forward" in the understanding of Neanderthals. In short, the message was "that the Neanderthals were 'thinking people' and that they were able to extract from the environment," for example "by cutting the feathers and inner bones from the birds of prey they captured, leaving them with the outer shell, and using them as ornaments as has been the case in other cultures across the world."

== Books ==
- The Coastal Shelf of the Mediterranean and Beyond: Corridor and Refugium for Human Populations in the Pleistocene (edited with Geoffrey Bailey, José S. Carrión, Darren A. Fa, Clive Finlayson, and Joaquín Rodríguez-Vidal)
- Biogeography of human colonisations and extinctions in the Pleistocene (with Clive Finlayson and Darren Fa)
- The Homo habitat niche: Using the avian fossil record to depict ecological characteristics of Palaeolithic Eurasian hominins (with Clive Finlayson et al.)
- Gibraltar at the end of the millennium: a portrait of a changing land (with Clive Finlayson), 1999

== Selected academic articles ==
- "The Homo habitat niche: using the avian fossil record to depict ecological characteristics of Palaeolithic Eurasian hominins" (with Clive Finlayson, José Carrión, Kimberly Brown, Antonio Sánchez-Marco, Darren Fa, Joaquín Rodríguez-Vidal, Santiago Fernández, Elena Fierro, Marco Bernal-Gómez, Francisco Giles-Pacheco), Quaternary Science Reviews, vol. 30, no. 11, pp. 1525–1532, 2011.
- "Earliest Known Use of Marine Resources by Neanderthals" (with Miguel Cortés-Sánchez, Arturo Morales-Muñiz, María D. Simón-Vallejo, María C. Lozano-Francisco, José L. Vera-Peláez, Clive Finlayson, Joaquín Rodríguez-Vidal, Antonio Delgado-Huertas, Francisco J. Jiménez-Espejo, Francisca Martínez-Ruiz, M. Aranzazu Martínez-Aguirre, Arturo J. Pascual-Granged), PLOS One, vol. 6, no. 9, 2011.
- "A coastal reservoir of biodiversity for Upper Pleistocene human populations: palaeoecological investigations in Gorham's Cave (Gibraltar) in the context of the Iberian Peninsula" (with J. S. Carrión, C. Finlayson, S. Fernández, E. Allué, J. A. López-Sáez, P. López-García, G. Gil-Romera, G. Bailey, P. González-Sampériz). Quaternary Science Reviews, vol. 27, no. 23, pp. 2118–2135, 2008.
- "Caves as archives of ecological and climatic changes in the Pleistocene—The case of Gorham's cave, Gibraltar" (with C. Finlayson, F. Giles Pacheco, J. Rodriguez Vidal, J. S. Carrión, J. M. Recio Espejo). Quaternary International, vol. 181, no. 1, pp. 55–63, 2008.
- ”Gorham's Cave, Gibraltar—The persistence of a Neanderthal population" (with Clive Finlayson, Darren A. Fa, Francisco Jiménez Espejo, Jóse S. Carrión, Francisco Giles Pacheco, Joaquín Rodríguez Vidal, Chris Stringer, Francisca Martínez Ruiz). Quaternary International – QUATERN INT, vol. 181, no. 1, pp. 64–71, 2008.
- ”The coastal shelf of the Mediterranean and beyond: Corridor and refugium for human populations in the Pleistocene" (with Geoff Bailey, José S. Carrión, Darren A. Fa, Clive Finlayson, Joaquín Rodríguez-Vidal). Quaternary Science Reviews, vol. 27, no. 23, pp. 2095–2099, 2008.
- ”Dynamics of a thermo-Mediterranean coastal environment – the Coto Doñana National Park" (with Clive Finlayson, J. M. Recio Espejo). Quaternary Science Reviews, vol. 27, no. 23, pp. 2145–2152, 2008.
- ”Climate forcing and Neanderthal extinction in Southern Iberia: insights from a multiproxy marine record" (with Francisco J. Jiménez-Espejo, Francisca Martínez-Ruiz, Clive Finlayson, Adina Paytan, Tatsuhiko Sakamoto, Miguel Ortega-Huertas, Koichi Iijima, David Gallego-Torres, Darren Fa). Quaternary Science Reviews, vol. 26, no. 7, pp. 836–852, 2007.
- ”Did the moderns kill off the Neanderthals? A reply to F. d’Errico and Sánchez Goñi" (with Clive Finlayson, Darren A. Fa, Francisco Giles Pacheco, Joaquin Rodrı́guez Vidal). Quaternary Science Reviews, vol. 23, no. 9, pp. 1205–1209, 2004.
- ”Did the moderns kill off the Neanderthals? A reply to F. d'Errico and Sanchez Goni" (with C. Finlayson, D. A. Fa, F. G. Pacheco, J. R. Vidal). Quaternary Science Reviews, vol. 23, pp. 1205–1209, 2004.
- ”Ecological transitions – But for whom? A perspective from the Pleistocene" (with Clive Finlayson, Antonio Monclova, José S. Carrión, Darren A. Fa, Joaquín Rodríguez-Vidal, Elena Fierro, Santiago Fernández, Marco Bernal-Gómez, Francisco Giles-Pacheco). Palaeogeography, Palaeoclimatology, Palaeoecology.
- ”The tools of the last Neanderthals: Morphotechnical characterisation of the lithic industry at level IV of Gorham’s Cave, Gibraltar" (with Francisco Giles Pacheco, Francisco J. Giles Guzmán, José María Gutiérrez López, Antonio Santiago Pérez, Clive Finlayson, Joaquín Rodríguez Vidal, Darren A. Fa). Quaternary International.
- ”El registro altitudinal de cambio climático en series kársticas pleistocenas de las Béticas occidentales Evidence of climate change at different altitudes within the karstic regions of the western Betic Range during the Late Pleistocene" (with J. Rodríguez-Vidal, L. M. Cáceres, A. Martínez-Aguirre, J. M. Alcaraz, C. Finlayson).

== Honors and awards ==
In 2003 Finlayson and the rest of the Gibraltar Museum team were awarded first prize in the National Archeological Society's "Adopt-a-Wreck" programme for their work on the armed trawler HMS Erin, and in 2006 Geraldine was granted the Gibraltar Award in the Queen's Birthday Honours List

In 2018, Finlayson was appointed adjunct professor at Liverpool John Moores University's Faculty of Science.

In 2019, Finlayson was bestowed the Gibraltar Medallion of Distinction, together with her husband Clive, for their work on Gorham's Cave.

== Personal life ==
Finlayson's husband, Clive Finlayson, is an evolutionary ecologist who is curator at the Gibraltar National Museum and who, along with his wife, participates in digs in the Neanderthal caves in Gibraltar and elsewhere. He keeps a blog about these activities at clivehumanevo.blogspot.com, and they have collaborated on many papers and other writings. He is the author of the book Neanderthals and Modern Humans. They have a son together.
