= Daniella Tilbury =

Gibraltarian academic and administrator

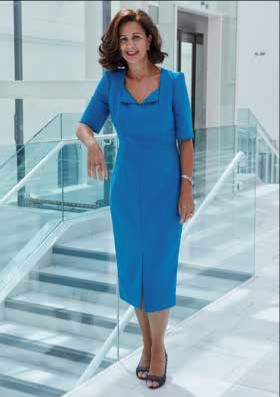
- Daniella Tilbury, previously Vice-Chancellor of the University of Gibraltar
- Born: Gibraltar
- Known for: Founding Vice-Chancellor and CEO University of Gibraltar, Chair of the UN Global Monitoring and Evaluation Expert Group in Education for Sustainability
- Political party: GSD (since 2023)
- Awards: David Irvine Prize, Best Geography Research Thesis(1990) Commonwealth Scholarship Award (1990) Macquarie Innovation Award (2005) Outstanding (University) Teacher Award (2003)

Daniella Tilbury is a Gibraltarian academic, educator and sustainable development leader who was the first woman in her country to hold the title of university professor. Tilbury was the inaugural Vice-Chancellor and CEO of the University of Gibraltar, and became the first Commissioner for Sustainable Development in May 2018. She was recognised as an honorary fellow of St Catharine's College, Cambridge in July 2018 for her scientific and social contributions.

Tilbury's international and policy work has contributed to the progression of sustainability as a key agenda for the future of higher education and to the development of Education for Sustainability. She was one of the first to develop research on higher education for sustainability, and then became one of the first to put the ambition into practice, in attempting to make ‘whole-institution’ sustainability a reality. Tilbury has held key sector positions and advisory roles and developed partnerships and alliances to help improve the contribution of higher education to sustainable development. In September 2023, Tilbury was one of ten candidates selected for the GSD in the 2023 Gibraltar general election, but she was not elected, placing 18th in the vote.

== Biography ==
Daniella Tilbury was born in the mid-1960s in Gibraltar. She was raised in Gibraltar and completed her early education there. She was a primary and secondary school teacher in Gibraltar, Spain and Australia in the 1980s.

=== UN Engagement ===
Tilbury commenced her academic career as a doctoral student at St Catharine's College, University of Cambridge in 1990 (Geography and Education) After working as a researcher and tutor at Cambridge, she became a lecturer in the education department at the University of Wales, Swansea. She then held various research and academic leadership positions at universities in the UK, Australia, Hong Kong and Gibraltar

Her work on frameworks for reorienting higher education towards sustainable development led to UN policy advisory roles and to her chairing several UN Committees on sustainable development, culture and/or education during 1995 and 2015 She has informed the development of UNESCO's global monitoring and evaluation reports in Education for Sustainability and reported on progress to various UN meetings including in Bonn 2009 and Nagoya 2014

She was commissioned by UNESCO during the UN Decade in Education for Sustainable Development to develop various think pieces including an expert review of learning for sustainability and sector evaluation of higher education These are available in four different languages.

Tilbury has been involved in international dialogues on climate change and was a delegate at the UN Climate Change Conferences held in Copenhagen (COP15) Marrakech (COP22) and Paris (COP21). She has drafted various Education Caucus submissions on climate change for these meetings.

In 2002, she was the keynote speaker at the World Summit on Sustainable Development. Tilbury led the process that resulted in the People's Higher Education Treaty for Sustainable Development presented at the World Summit for Sustainable Development in Rio ten years later (2012).

She directed the UNESCO-IUCN Asia Pacific Indicators Project (2004–07) and was a member of Indicators Expert Group of the United Nations Economic Council for Europe (UNECE) and for five years, the IUCN CEC Global Chair in Education for Sustainability (2000-2005). Tilbury led several UNESCO projects on intercultural education and sustainability that involved policy dialogues as well as the identification of good practices.

=== ARIES ===
Tilbury served as an associate professor at Macquarie University in Sydney. She became the founding director of Australian Research Institute for Education and Sustainability (ARIES), when the institute was established by the Australian government in 2003. The project aimed to research and establish protocols for environmental sustainability across multiple sectors of the economy, including business and industry education, community education and all levels of school education. In 2005, she was appointed as the United Nations Decade of Education for Sustainable Development initiative and ARIES became responsible for monitoring Australia's progress with the UN program, including developing links between economic sectors, recommending governmental change for future sustainability and monitoring development.

Under Tilbury's leadership ARIES was instrumental in informing and encouraging the adoption of sustainability education in Australia. Its research has informed Australian Government policy and has also shifted the policies and practices of business, business education and educational organisations. As a nation, Australia is now recognised as a leader in this field of Education for Sustainable Development.

=== Dean of Sustainability at the University of Gloucester ===
Moving to Cheltenham, England in 2007, Tilbury held the chair in Sustainability at the University of Gloucestershire. and had institutional responsibilities for campus, community and curriculum work in this area. She became Dean of Sustainability during her time at Gloucestershire and in this capacity led the institution to six Green Gown Awards and to the No.1 spot in the UK Green League. During her time as Dean, Gloucestershire maintained its sustainability performance and became a sector leader known for its whole-of-institution approach to sustainability.

Tilbury promoted academic as well as practical sustainability initiatives. She led improvements in the carbon footprint of the university but also established the International Research Institute for Sustainable Development (IRIS) attracting funding from various business, corporate entities and education foundations. She established the UN Regional Centre of Expertise in Education for Sustainability (RCE Severn) working with community and business groups to advance sustainability in the region.

In 2009, she was selected as a Marie Curie Fellow by the European Commission to broker interdisciplinary dialogues and build inter-professional capability in sustainability research and that same year was appointed to serve on the United Nations Economic Commission for Europe's Expert Group on Competences. Though she continued her academic work at Cheltenham, in 2012, Tilbury was appointed by the Government of Gibraltar to advise on a feasibility study for the development of the University of Gibraltar. The following year, she was selected by the Horizon 2020 programme of the European Union and Mohammed VI and Princess Lalla Salma of Morocco to assist in the development of higher education in Morocco. She was the keynote speaker for the 7th World Environmental Education Congress held in June 2013 in Marrakesh.

=== Higher Education leader and adviser ===
Tilbury has acted as a government advisor to higher education agencies in China, Latin America, Australia and New Zealand as well as travelled in Africa and Asia to evaluate the investment and impact of sustainability programmes. Daniella has also led higher education change efforts for sustainability that have been recognised with Green Gown Awards 2008, 2010 and 2011 in the UK and Australia. UK higher education agencies such as Higher Education Funding Council for England; the Higher Education Academy and the Quality Assurance Agency commissioned Tilbury to undertake research as well as change projects in the area of education for sustainability. Tilbury led the multi-agency project" ‘Quality and Higher Education for Sustainability’, as well as the Flexible Pedagogies research initiative.

She was elected President of the Copernicus Alliance of Universities in 2012 and served two consecutive terms. The COPERNICUS Alliance (CA) is a European Higher Education for Sustainable Development Network which brings together higher education institutions, associations and agencies which are committed to making a contribution to sustainability through the Copernicus Charta. During her time as president she attracted 600,000 euros of funding from the European Commission to establish the University Educators for Sustainable Development (UE4SD) initiative. The project brought together 55 partners in 33 countries during its three-year duration. The main aim of the project was to change University education so that it can prepare students, regardless of course or specialisation, to understand and apply global responsibility.

In 2015, Tilbury became the inaugural Vice-Chancellor and CEO of the newly established University of Gibraltar. She oversaw the creation of the university's research development programmes and assisted in the development of the institutional strategic plan and financial plan for the university. Tilbury had been involved since 2011 when asked to develop a feasibility study for the new university. During her time as VC she brought in income and large research grants from the European Commission as well as from private foundations. She sought to establish academic alliances research funding and commercial partnerships within Gibraltar as well as beyond the Straits of Gibraltar. As CEO, the university hosted the UNCTAD Centre of Excellence and the EU Brexit Referendum. Tilbury raised international awareness of Gibraltar's predicament following the result.

=== HMGOG Commissioner for Sustainable Development ===
In May 2018, she left the University of Gibraltar when she was appointed as the first Commissioner for Sustainable Development, a newly created post in the Government of Gibraltar. Her role has special responsibilities for the Commonwealth. In July 2018, Tilbury became the first Gibraltarian to be recognised as an honorary fellow of St Catharine's College, Cambridge.

=== The Commonwealth ===
Tilbury is a Commonwealth Scholar and during her time as Vice-Chancellor, introduced The Commonwealth Scholarship and Fellowship Scheme to the University of Gibraltar She has participated in a number of high level Commonwealth events and in her current role has special responsibilities for the commonwealth. She is Secretary of the Gibraltar Royal Commonwealth Society.

=== World Wide Fund for Nature (WWF) ===
Tilbury was a member of the Board of WWF Australia and formed part of the governance team that brought Earth Hour to the World in 2007. Earlier during the late 1990s, Tilbury undertook an extensive evaluation of WWF investment in education. This involved her travelling and assessing field projects in Madagascar, Tanzania, South Africa, China, Japan, Korea, Venezuela, Brazil, Colombia, Italy, Morocco, Australia and the US

=== Fellowships ===
- Marie Curie International Incoming Fellowship (2009)
- Honorary Fellow, St Catharine's College, University of Cambridge (2018)
- Fellow of the Royal Society of the Arts (2007)
- Foundation Fellow of the Leadership Academy (2010)
- Fellow, of the Salzburg Sustainability Leadership Academy (2013)
- Principal Fellow of the Higher Education Academy (2015)

== Selected works ==
- Tilbury, D (August 2017). Student Engagement and Leadership in Higher Education for Sustainability, in Barth M, Michelsen G, Rieckmann M, Thomas I (Eds.) Routledge Handbook of Higher Education for Sustainable Development. London and New York: Routledge. pp. 241–260.
- Tilbury, D (2011). "Higher Education for Sustainability: A Global Overview of Commitment and Progress". Higher Education in the World 4. Higher Education's Commitment to Sustainability: 18–28.
- Tilbury, D (2011). "Education for Sustainable Development: An Expert Review of Processes and Learning" (PDF). p. 132.
- Tilbury, D (2011). "Are We Learning to Change? Mapping Global Progress in Education for Sustainable Development in the Lead Up to 'Rio Plus 20" (PDF). pp. 101–107.
- Tilbury, D (2012). "Higher Education In, Silvier, B Encyclopedia of Sustainability: Knowledge to Transform our Common Future". The Future of Sustainability. 10. Archived from the original on 4 March 2016.
- Tilbury, D; Ryan, A (2018). Today becomes tomorrow: Re-thinking business practice, education and learning in the context of sustainability. UNESCO Asia and Pacific Region Bureau for Education. ISBN 978-92-9223-115-6.
- Tilbury, D; Wortman, D (2004). Engaging People in Sustainability (PDF). Commission on Education and Communication. ISBN 978-2-8317-0823-2.
