= Clive Finlayson =

Gibraltarian zoologist, paleoanthropologist and palaeontologist

Prof. Clive Finlayson MBE GMD MAE
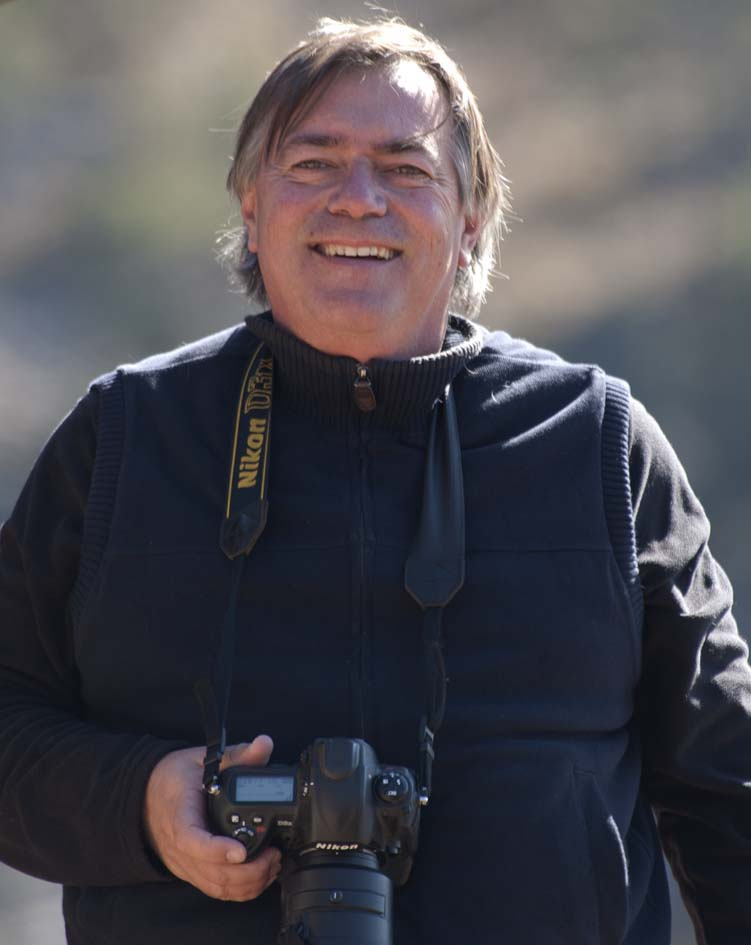
- Professor Clive Finlayson in 2012
- Born: 15 January 1955 (age 71); Gibraltar
- Education: University of Liverpool; Oriel College, Oxford; Leicester University
- Known for: Director of the Gibraltar National Museum; Publications on Neanderthal ecology and avian biogeography
- Spouse: Prof. Geraldine Finlayson
- Awards: 1976, Recipient of the first David Lack Studentship awarded by the British Ornithologists' Union; 1990, Fellow of the Linnean Society of London; 2001, Adjunct Professor, Department of Anthropology University of Toronto; 2003, Made MBE; 2010, Elected member of Academia Europaea; 2019, Bestowed Gibraltar Medallion of Distinction; 2019, Beacon Professor, University of Gibraltar
- Scientific career
- Fields: Paleoanthropology; Paleontology; Zoology
- Workplaces: Gibraltar National Museum
- Thesis: The ecology and behaviour of closely related species at Gibraltar (with special reference to swifts and warblers) (1979)

Prof. Clive Finlayson MBE FLS (born 15 January 1955) is a Gibraltarian zoologist, paleoanthropologist and paleontologist. He is the incumbent Director of the Gibraltar National Museum. Finlayson has published various works mainly based on his research which includes ongoing excavations at Gorham's Cave in Gibraltar, the last known site of the Neanderthals.

== Education ==
Clive Finlayson was born on Gibraltar on 15 January 1955. He has an elder brother, Tommy Finlayson. The Finlaysons are of Scottish descent, but they have been on the Rock since the early 19th century. Clive Finlayson was educated at the Gibraltar Grammar School. He completed a BSc Special Honours degree in Zoology at the University of Liverpool in 1976. In 1980 he graduated with a Doctorate of Philosophy (DPhil) from Oriel College, Oxford and later went on to obtain an MSc in Museum Studies from Leicester University.

== Career ==
Shortly after graduating from his degree, Finlayson became increasingly active within local natural and cultural heritage circles. He founded the Gibraltar Ornithological & Natural History Society (GONHS) in 1978, an organisation which he chaired until 1992. He was also a trustee of the Gibraltar Heritage Trust from 1987 to 1989.

Having been the managing director of the Gibraltar Tourism Agency, he took up the position of Director of the Gibraltar Museum in 1991 which he holds to date (June 2012) and is also the Director of the Gibraltar Culture and Heritage Agency's Heritage Division.

In 2001 Finlayson was appointed to the staff of the Department of Anthropology at the University of Toronto. He was made MBE in the 2003 New Year Honours.

His various publications include literature on the Neanderthals and Modern Humans as well as on ornithology and his research programme includes ongoing excavations at Gorham's Cave, the last known site of the Neanderthals, as part of the Gibraltar Caves Project. Finlayson's 2009 book on Neanderthals and their interaction with Homo sapiens expands on the idea that we were the same species since modern man contains genetic sequences that are shared with neanderthals and the possibility of interbreeding is likely. However, Finlayson discusses that because these shared genetic sequences are common across the globe then it is possible that these shared genes are due to our common heritage in Africa.

Along with his many varied roles, he also acts as a consultant to the UNESCO World Heritage Centre in Paris.

== Fellowships and awards ==
- 1976, Recipient of the first David Lack Studentship awarded by the British Ornithologists' Union.
- 1990, Fellow of the Linnean Society of London.
- 2001, Adjunct professor, Department of Anthropology University of Toronto
- 2003, Awarded MBE in The Queen's New Year Honours.
- 2010, Elected member of Academia Europaea
- 2018, Visiting Professor, Faculty of Science, Liverpool John Moores University
- 2019, Bestowed Gibraltar Medallion of Distinction
- 2019, Beacon Professor, University of Gibraltar

== Publications ==
=== Authored ===
- Finlayson, Clive (2019). The Smart Neanderthal: Bird catching, cave art & the cognitive revolution. Oxford: Oxford University Press. ISBN 9780198797524.
- Finlayson, Clive (2014). The Improbable Primate: How Water Shaped Human Evolution. Oxford: Oxford University Press. ISBN 9780199658794.
- Finlayson, Clive (2011). Avian Survivors: Climate Change and the History of the Birds of the Western Palearctic. T. & A. D. Poyser. ISBN 978-0713688658.
- Finlayson, Clive (2009). The Humans Who Went Extinct: Why Neanderthals Died Out and We Survived. Oxford: Oxford University Press. ISBN 978-0199239191.
- Finlayson, Clive (2009). Neanderthals and Modern Humans: An Ecological and Evolutionary Perspective. Cambridge University Press. ISBN 978-0521121002.
- Finlayson, Clive (2007). Al-Andalus. Santana Books. ISBN 978-8489954694.
- Finlayson, Clive (1993). A Birdwatchers' Guide to Southern Spain and Gibraltar. Prion. ISBN 1871104033.
- Finlayson, Clive (1991). Birds of the Strait of Gibraltar. Poyser. ISBN 978-1408136959.

=== Co-authored ===
- Finlayson, Clive; Finlayson, Geraldine; Finlayson, Stewart (2024). GIBRALTAR: geography, nature, history, heritage. Gibraltar: Gibraltar National Museum.
- Finlayson, Geraldine; Finlayson, Stewart; Finlayson, Clive (2022). BIRD MIGRATION Between Europe and Africa. Gibraltar: Gibraltar National Museum.
- Finlayson, Clive; Finlayson, Geraldine; Finlayson, Stewart (2017). LOST WORLD: Secrets of a World Heritage Site. Gibraltar: Gibraltar Museum.
- Finlayson, Clive; Finlayson, Geraldine; Finlayson, Stewart (2013). A Guide to Wild Spain, Portugal and Gibraltar. Mijas Pueblo: Santana Books. ISBN 978-84-89954-97-7.
- Where the Last Neanderthals Lived: A Study of Neanderthal and Modern Human Behavioural Ecology in a Glacial Refugium. Oxbow Books. 2012. ISBN 978-1842172650.
- The Fortifications of Gibraltar 1068–1945. Osprey Publishing. 2006. ISBN 1846030161.
- Birds of Iberia. BookLink Distribution. 2006. ISBN 978-84-89954-28-1.
- Finlayson, Clive & Geraldine (1999). Gibraltar at the end of the Millennium: A Portrait of a Changing Land. Gibraltar: Aquila Services.
- Finlayson, Clive; Cortes, John E. (1988). The Flowers and Wildlife of Gibraltar. Ashford, Buchan & Enright. ISBN 0948466073.
