= Mariola Summerfield =

Gibraltarian women's rights activist (1927–2021)

Mariola Summerfield (1927 – February 17, 2021) was a women's rights activist in Gibraltar. A co-founder and longtime chairperson of the Gibraltar Women's Association, she fought for women's legal rights and economic empowerment beginning in the postwar period.

== Early life ==
Mariola Summerfield was born in Gibraltar in 1927. As a child, she was part of the mass evacuation of the Gibraltarian civilian population during World War II, relocating to Casablanca, Rabat, and London with her family.

== Activism ==
Summerfield returned to Gibraltar after the war, and in 1966 she co-founded the Housewives' Association alongside Angela Smith. The women's rights organization, originally conceived of as a meeting of all the housewives in Gibraltar, became known as the Gibraltar Women's Association in the early 1980s.

After initially serving as the organization's vice chair, she went on to lead the association for two decades, from 1969 to 1989, fighting for equal rights for Gibraltarian women. After stepping down, she continued as "life honorary president" until her death.

In its early years, the Housewives' Association opposed encroachment by the Franco dictatorship and played a prominent role in the community's response to his closure of the border with Spain in 1969. Summerfield helped encourage women to take the jobs previously held by Spaniards who could no longer cross the border. The organization also worked to improve quality of life for Gibraltarian families, including through running a fruit and vegetable cooperative. In the 1970s, Summerfield led the association in successfully pushing to change a number of laws affecting women in Gibraltar, including those dealing with equal pay, divorce, and women's role in the judicial system. As women's participation in civic life expanded in Gibraltar, she herself became the territory's first female juror.

In 2007, Summerfield published a memoir titled A Woman's Place: Memoirs of a Gibraltarian woman — a "Llanita." A member of the Order of the British Empire, she was also awarded a Gibraltar Medallion of Honour in 2015.

== Death and legacy ==
Summerfield died in 2021 at age 93. On her death, Gibraltar Chief Minister Fabian Picardo described her as a "national treasure."
