= Christian Hook =

Gibraltarian artist (born 1971)

- Born: 1971 (age 54–55); Gibraltar
- Education: Illustration, Middlesex University
- Movement: Contemporary Figurative Art
- Website: christianhook.com

Christian Hook (born 1971) is a Gibraltarian contemporary artist.

Hook was born in Gibraltar in 1971. He studied illustration at Middlesex University in the United Kingdom, and then worked as a part-time lecturer at the Royal College of Art in London.

In 2014 he won the Sky Arts Portrait Artist of the Year contest with a portfolio of work completed during the competition including portraits of boxer Amir Khan and actor Sir Ian McKellen. A resulting commission was to paint a portrait of Alan Cumming for the National Galleries of Scotland. The painting was later chosen by John Leighton, director of the National Galleries of Scotland, as one of the best 100 paintings in its collection.

Hook has also painted Kristin Scott Thomas. He was awarded the Freedom of the City of Gibraltar in 2017.

In 2018, Hook released his ‘KI’ series, a collection of large-scale oil paintings inspired by his travels around Japan, focusing mainly on the ancient traditions of calligraphy and 'Chi'.

Hook was the keynote speaker at Althorp Literary Festival 2018.

Over the course of 2020 and 2021, Christian has been filming a Sky Arts documentary entitled 'Painting the Invisible'. The documentary will focus on Hook's new series of work which explores the concept of synaesthesia, and features several Nobel Prize winning scientists.

Christian Hook works as a full time artist, creating paintings “depicting motion, time and the moments that occur between events.” Christian has created paintings of celebrities, historical landmarks, and horses.

== Selected Major Commissions/Portraits ==
Hook has been commissioned by and produced portraits for figures such as Queen Elizabeth II, Sarah Ferguson, the Maharaja of Jodhpur, Sir Ian McKellen, Amir Khan, Mick Hucknall, Kristin Scott Thomas and Sue Johnson, among many others.

- 2020 - Portrait of Sir Richard Branson
- 2017 - 2 hour Live painting of Kristin Scott Thomas for cover of Financial Times ‘How to spend It magazine’ - Paris
- 2017 - Live painting of ShiLai Liu, Chinese Entrepreneur
- 2016 - 2 hour live painting of the Maharaja of Jodhpur - India
- 2016 - 2 hour live painting of Joan Bakewell for Sky Arts Awards
- 2016 - 2 hour live painting of British Actor Simon Callow
- 2014 - Portrait of Amir Khan (world champion boxer), Bolton Museum, Permanent Collection
- 2014 - Portrait of Alan Cumming (Actor), Scottish National Portrait Gallery, Permanent Collection
- 2014 - Portrait of Sarah Ferguson (Duchess of York)
- 2014 - Portrait of Sir Ian McKellen

== Awards ==
In the course of his career Hook has won several awards, including the Sky Arts Portrait Artist of the Year 2014 (in a presentation held at the National Portrait Gallery, London), and was awarded the Freedom of the City of Gibraltar in 2017. His artwork was chosen by Sir John Leighton from 100,000 works as one of the ‘100 Masterpieces’ from the collection of the National Galleries of Scotland, alongside pieces by Botticelli, Rembrandt and Matisse.

- 2017 - Awarded 'Freedom of the city Gibraltar'
- 2015 - 'Honey Jar' - Portrait of Alan Cumming selected by Lord Leighton as one of the 100 masterpieces from the National Galleries of Scotland
- 2014 - Winner of Sky Arts Portrait Artist Of The Year – UK
- 1991 - Kate Parker Life Drawing Award – London

== Public Collections ==
Christian’s work is included in numerous significant public and private collections, including but not limited to:

- Royal Collection
- Scottish National Portrait Gallery
- Bolton Museum
- Museum of Liverpool
- Gibraltar Museum
