= Mary Chiappe =

Gibraltarian writer and educator (1939–2017)

- Born: Gibraltar
- Died: 8 December 2017; Gibraltar
- Occupation(s): Writer, politician
- Known for: Giovanni Bresciano series

Mary Chiappe was a Gibraltarian writer and former Gibraltar Minister for Education in the 1960s. She was the author of several books, including the Giovanni Bresciano series of detective novels set in the 18th and 19th centuries, which she had written in conjunction with the Gibraltarian writer and historian Sam Benady. She had written a regular weekly column in the Gibraltar Chronicle since 2001. With Dr Sam Benady, she received a Gibraltar Heritage Trust Award in October 2015 for historical detective series: for making Gibraltar's history of the period and cultural heritage accessible to readers. She died on Friday 8 December 2017 in Gibraltar, surrounded by friends and family.

- Cabbages and Kings (2006) Essays
- The Grapes of Warmth (2003) Autobiographical
- A Handful of Poems (1995) Serious light verse
- The Murder in Whirligig Lane (2010) with Dr. Sam Benady
- Fall of a Sparrow (2010) with Dr. Sam Benady
- The Pearls of Tangier (2011 )with Dr. Sam Benady
- The Prince's Lady (2012) with Dr. Sam Benady
- Mosaic of an Unquiet Time (2013) Novel
- The Devil's Tongue (2013) with Dr. Sam Benady
- Death in Paradise Ramp (2014) with Dr. Sam Benady
- The Dead Can't Paint (2015) with Dr. Sam Benady
- Shaking the Dandelions (2017)
