= Willa Vasquez Serfaty =

Gibraltarian artist (born 1954)

- Born: Willa Vasquez Serfaty; 1954 (age 71–72); Gibraltar
- Education: Academia Marqués de Cuba, Madrid
- Known for: Painting
- Website: Willa.gi

Willa Vasquez Serfaty is a Gibraltarian artist.

== Biography ==
She was born in Gibraltar in 1954 into an artistic family, from an early age Willa became a pupil of local artist Leni Mifsud, one of the few women artists who were making their mark in painting. Later on she studied drawing at the Academia Marqués de Cuba in Madrid.

She had her first joint exhibition at the age of 18 with her sisters in Gibraltar followed by another one the following year in London, at the Kings Gallery in Hampstead, after that Willa spent some time in Florence, Italy learning new techniques.

Since then Willa has been a prominent figure in the art world in Gibraltar, she has had a number of very successful exhibitions and has also exhibited in a plethora of collective exhibitions both in Gibraltar and Spain. Her work was chosen for a collection of works by artists of the Campo de Gibraltar held in the Spanish institute in Manhattan, New York, which subsequently toured various cities within the United States.

She was a member of the Stamp Advisory Committee between 1989 and 1994. Until 2005 she has also been a member of Gibraltar Government Arts Advisory Council, organising both historical and competitive exhibitions.

For the last twenty five years she has held art classes at the "Arts Centre" in Gibraltar. She has recently been the founding member and President of the Gibraltar Fine Arts Association, and inaugurated the Fine Arts Gallery at Grand Casemates Square in 2001 as a hub for the work of local artists. She stepped down from the association after seven years to concentrate on her artistic career.
