= Sam Benady =

Gibraltarian historian and writer

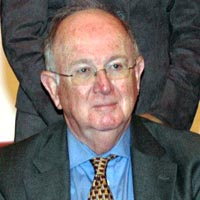
Benady in 2008.

Samuel G. Benady (born 11 September 1937 in Gibraltar) is a Gibraltarian historian, novelist and retired paediatrician of Sephardic Jewish descent. He has been a regular contributor to the Gibraltar Heritage Trust's Journal, and lecturer in the Gibraltar Museum, and author of several works related to the history of Gibraltar and also works of fiction. According to the Gibraltar Chronicle, Benady is "Gibraltar’s well known and prolific author".

Benady was born in Gibraltar, where his family has lived since the 18th century, and received his Medicine degree in London. He worked as a paediatrician in Bristol, Jerusalem and Gibraltar, where he ran the Child Health service. Benady worked for the Gibraltar Health Authority from 1980 until his retirement in 2002. In 2007 he was appointed a MBE "for services to health care and voluntary work".

== Work ==
In 1990, Benady published two short stories in Sherlock Holmes in Gibraltar. These pastiches are set in the pre-Watson days. In the first one, The Abandoned Brigantine, Sherlock Holmes reveals the solution to the mystery of the Mary Celeste, while in the second, The Gibraltar Letter, the detective solves the case of the abduction of the Duke of Connaught while he was posted to Gibraltar. In 1992, after reading La compra de Gibraltar por los conversos andaluces, ("The purchase of Gibraltar by Andalusian conversos"), a monograph by Diego Lamelas about the story of the Cordova conversos who purchased Gibraltar in the 15th century, Benady translated and published it in English as The Sale of Gibraltar in 1474. Then, he approached the history of St. Bernard's Hospital, publishing Civil Hospital and Epidemics in Gibraltar. Diary of an Epidemic and Passing through the Fever (both co-authored with Prof. L A Sawchuk) were published in 2003 and 2005. In 2005, Benady approached the biography genre, publishing a work on Sir George Don, Lieutenant Governor of Gibraltar from 1814 to 1831. The Keys of the City: An Episode in the History of Gibraltar, also published in 2005, is a historical novel based in his former translation of Lamelas' work. A Spanish translation by Cayetano Ramirez has been published in 2015 by Nagrela Editores of Madrid, with the title Las llaves de Gibraltar. Next came a detective mystery series of seven novels set in 18th and 19th century Gibraltar featuring the amateur detective Giovanni Bresciano, co-authored with Mary Chiappe. His latest project is 'A Pictorial History of Gibraltar' with Sarah Devincenzi (illustrator), published in 2019.

== Publications ==
- Sherlock Holmes in Gibraltar (Gibraltar Books) 1990 ISBN 0-948466-15-4
- The Sale of Gibraltar in 1474: To the New Christians of Cordova, translation into English of La compra de Gibraltar por los conversos andaluces by Diego Lamelas (Gibraltar Books) 1992 ISBN 0-948466-20-0
- Civil Hospital and Epidemics in Gibraltar (Gibraltar Books) 1994 ISBN 0-948466-33-2
- Diary of an epidemic: Yellow Fever in Gibraltar, 1828 (co-author) (Gibraltar Government Heritage Division), 2003 ISBN 1-919658-04-1
- Passing Through the Fever (co-author) (Diva Media, Toronto) 2005
- General Sir George Don and the Dawn of Gibraltarian Identity (Gibraltar Books) 2005
- The Keys of the City: An Episode in the History of Gibraltar (Gibraltar Books) 2005.
- The Murder in Whirligig Lane (co-author) (Calpe Press) 2010.
- Fall of a Sparrow. (HKB Press) (co-author) 2010.
- The Pearls of Tangier (Rock Scorpion Books) (co-author) 2011.
- The Prince's Lady (Two Pillars Press) (co-author) 2012.
- The Devil's Tongue (Two Pillars Press) (co-author) 2013.
- Death in Paradise Ramp (Two Pillars Press) (co-author) 2014.
- The Dead can't Paint (Two Pillars Press) (co-author) 2015.
- A Pictorial History of Gibraltar (Two Pillars Press) (co-author) 2019.

== See also ==
- List of authors of new Sherlock Holmes stories
