= Pepe Forbes =

Gibraltarian boxing matchmaker and agent

- Born: Joseph Forbes; 17 September 1917; Gibraltar
- Died: 25 September 2013 (aged 96)
- Occupations: Matchmaker; Boxing agent
- Years active: 1940s – present
- Known for: Working for promoters Jack Solomons, Barry Hearn and Frank Warren
- Awards: EBU special recognition

Joseph "Pepe" Forbes (17 September 1917, Gibraltar – 25 September 2013) is a Gibraltarian matchmaker and boxing agent based in London.

== Career ==
Forbes began his working life training race horses in Spain. At the outbreak of World War II he moved to England where he found work as a boxing agent.

Forbes has worked with all the major British promoters of the last 60 years, including Jack Solomons, Barry Hearn and Frank Warren.

== Awards ==
In 2009 Forbes was presented a special recognition by the European Boxing Union for his long and meritorious services to boxing.
