= Surianne =

Surianne Dalmedo
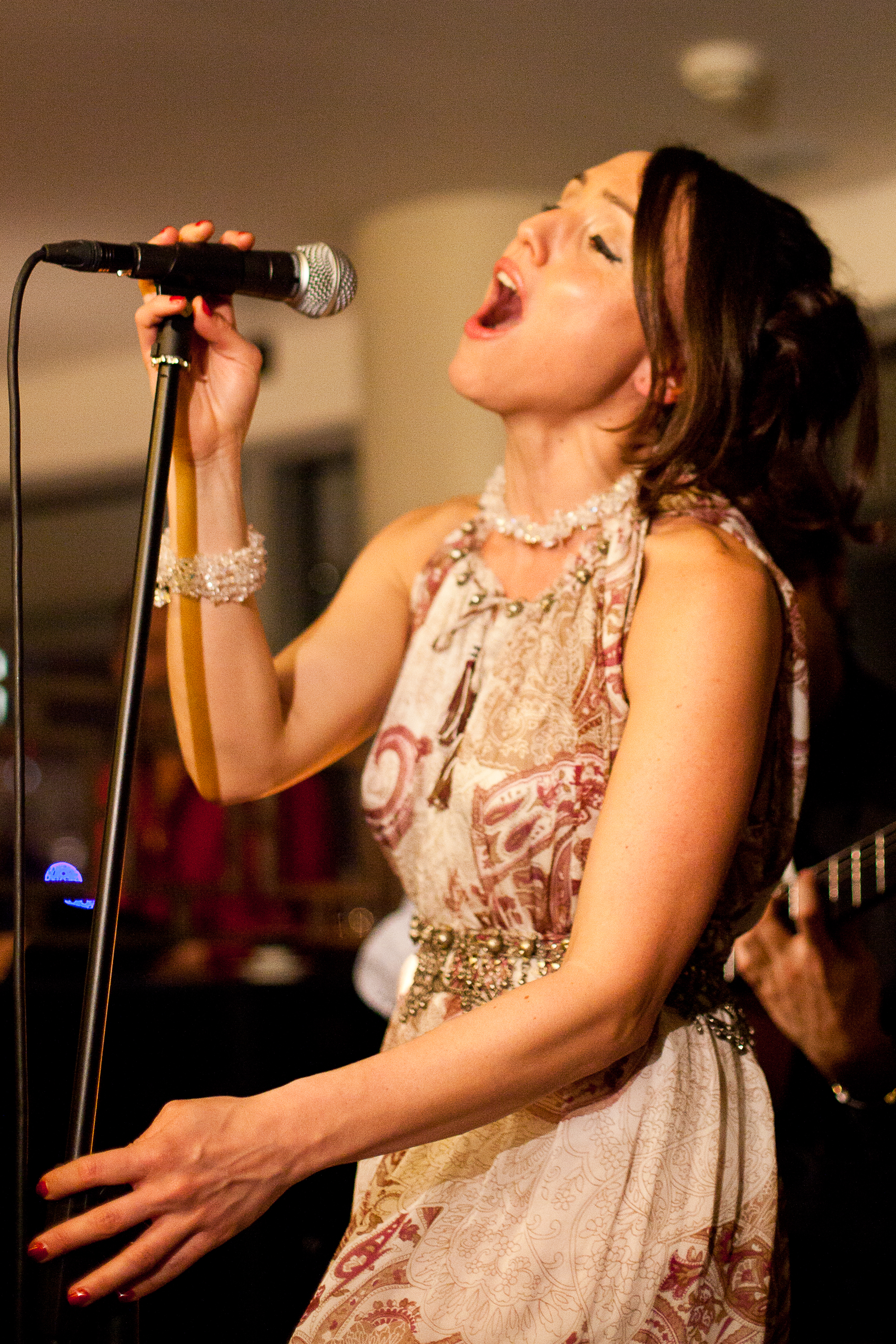
- Surianne live at Hotel Verta.

Background information
- Born: Surianne; Gibraltar
- Genres: Latin, rock, flamenco, acoustic
- Occupations: Singer, songwriter
- Instruments: Vocals, acoustic guitar
- Website: www.surianne.com

Surianne Dalmedo, known as Surianne, is a Gibraltarian international singer and songwriter of acoustic Latin/Rock/Flamenco music. Described as "la niña del sur" (Spanish: girl of the South) her music style is derived from a blend of various cultures; Gibraltarian, Spanish, British and North African, inspired by Mediterranean grooves, strongly influenced by the fusion of acoustic guitar sounds and driving percussive rhythms. On 8 March 2017, Surianne was honoured as being one of seven most successful women of Gibraltar in celebration of International Women's Day.

== Career ==
Her single "Stronger Than Before" entered the iTunes UK Top 100 Latino songs at No. 56 on 25 January 2011. She continued her work as an Ambassador for London-based charity Hestia Housing & Support, organising music workshops and events and promoting Hestia's Domestic Violence services. In 2016, she released an experimental new single "Hold On", produced by Mikki Nilsen and music video produced by Paul Isola from Gibraltar rock band Breed77. In 2010, Surianne formed part of a Reggaeton project and worked with British record producer and composer Jay Singh (known for the hit single "Dare La La La" which he co-wrote and produced for Shakira's tenth studio album, going top 10 in most countries worldwide) co-writing a track called "Amor". In 2016, Latino artist Jesse Medeles releases "Amor" as his second single after reaching No. 1 on the Top 20 National Latin Dance Charts across the US with his first single "Sucia".She also was a Referee in the France Vs Gibraltar international match.

Surianne has performed alongside artists such as Yazz, Nate James, John Adeleye, David Jordan, Suzanne Vega, Steve Balsamo, Anthony Joseph & The Spasm Band, Breed77, Spencer Kennedy, Natalie McCool, Gak Jonze among others.

In April 2017, Surianne co–wrote with producer Terry Shaughnessy, "We Are As One", a song that celebrates unity in diversity and became the official anthem for the second annual United Nationalities Marbella Summit organised by Marbella NOW TV, that took place on 25 April 2017, in Marbella.

In April 2019, Surianne is invited to perform as a guest artist, alongside singer Yazz, for the E17 BOY Productions young talent singer songwriter competition in Marbella in association with Warrior Film Promotions and Warrior Global Media.

On 7 December 2019, Surianne performed with her band 'Levanter Breeze' at the 7th Gibraltar International Jazz Festival at St. Michaels Cave, supporting Italian saxophonist Stefano Di Battista. She also performed in the 4th and 5th edition of the festival as part of the 'One Night Only... The Jazz Club'.

On 28 December 2019, Surianne was runner up in the annual Gibraltar singer-songwriter competition held at the Rock on the Rock Club, Gibraltar.

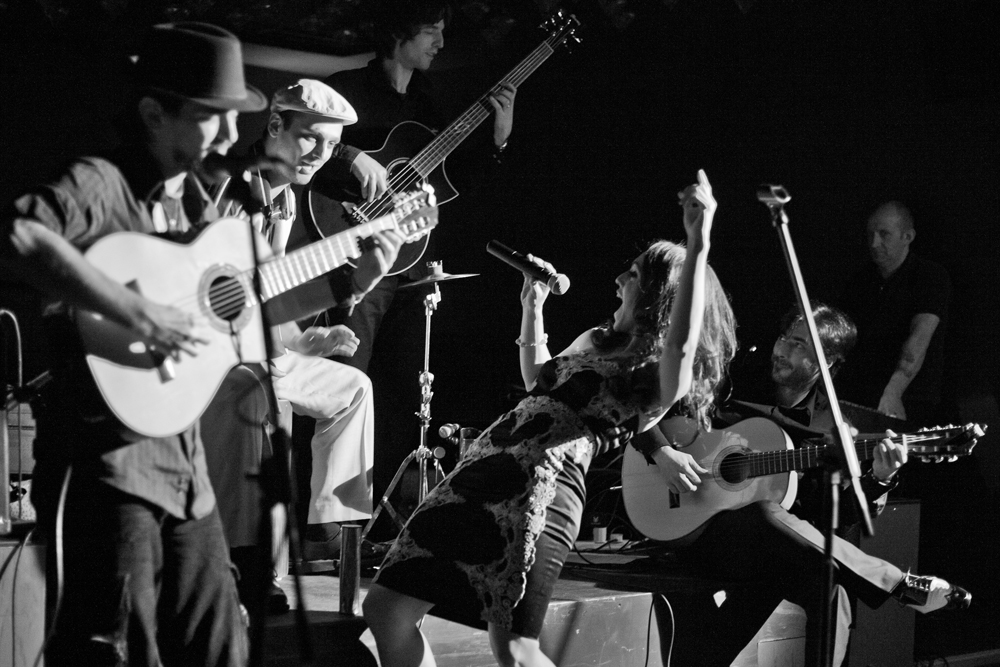
Surianne and her band at Jalouse

== Personal life ==
Surianne, although not married, is partner of the lead singer of Gibraltarian rock band Breed77, Paul Isola. They have been together since 2000.
