= New Gibraltar Democracy =

- Leader: Charles Gomez
- Founded: 2005
- Dissolved: 2007
- Headquarters: Secretary's Lane, Gibraltar
- Ideology: Conservatism; Christian democracy
- Political position: Centre-right
- Colours: Yellow and white

Website
- N/A

New Gibraltar Democracy (NGD) was a conservative and Christian-democratic political party in Gibraltar founded in 2005 by Gibraltarian barrister Charles Gomez. The party's aim was "to create a new vision for politics in Gibraltar"

In the 2007 General Election, NGD Leader Charles Gomez polled 1,210 votes in an electorate of just over 14,000. Making it the best performance for a first time independent candidate in Gibraltar's history.

== Election results ==
=== Parliament of Gibraltar ===
Election year	# of overall votes	% of overall vote	# of overall seats won	±
2007	1,210	1.0	0 / 15	New
