= Angela Smith (Gibraltarian activist) =

Gibraltarian activist

Angela Smith is a women's rights activist from Gibraltar, who founded the Gibraltar Women's Association (GWA)]. The GWA stemmed from the Gibraltar Housewives Association, which was established by Smith. She was chair of the association from 1966 to 1969. In 1966 she organised a petition, signed by 96% of the women's electorate, designed to demonstrate to the British government that Gibraltar wished to remain British. The same year, when General Franco banned Spanish women from crossing the border to work in Gibraltar, Smith was instrumental in establishing a Gibraltarian women's workforce. In 2016, at the fiftieth anniversary celebrations of the GWA, a letter from Smith was read out by her daughter.
