= University of Gibraltar =

Public university in Gibraltar

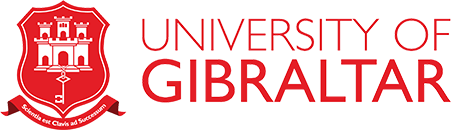
- Motto: Scientia est Clavis ad Successum
- Motto in English: Knowledge is the Key to Success
- Type: Public university
- Established: 2015
- Academic affiliations: Association of Commonwealth Universities
- Chancellor: Sir Lindsay Hoyle
- Vice-Chancellor: Catherine Bachleda
- Students: 125 (in 2021)
- Location: Europa Point, Gibraltar; 36°06′40.4″N 5°20′52.9″W
- Website: www.unigib.edu.gi

The University of Gibraltar is a degree-awarding higher education institution established by the Government of Gibraltar through the University of Gibraltar Act 2015. The founding of the university was described by Gibraltar's Chief Minister Fabian Picardo as "a coming-of-age" for the British Overseas Territory.

The university's main campus is at Europa Point, the southernmost part of the Rock of Gibraltar, within a range of restored former military buildings.

Aligned to UK standards, the range of disciplines offered for research and study include Business & Management, History & Culture, Education, Natural Sciences & Environment, Health & Sport Sciences and Responsible Gaming. A number of business-led professional courses are also offered including Accountancy, Gibraltar Tax, and Law.

The university is a member of a number of academic and international organisations, including the Association of Commonwealth Universities (ACU).

The University of Gibraltar has achieved global accreditation from the Quality Assurance Agency for Higher Education (QAA), the UK's independent quality body and a global leader in quality assurance for higher education.

The global accreditation, obtained for a period of five years, is awarded to international institutions who have passed the QAA's rigorous International Quality Review (IQR), which measures global institutions against international quality assurance standards set out in Part 1 of the Standards and Guidelines for Quality Assurance in the European Higher Education Area (ESG).

== Leadership and governance ==
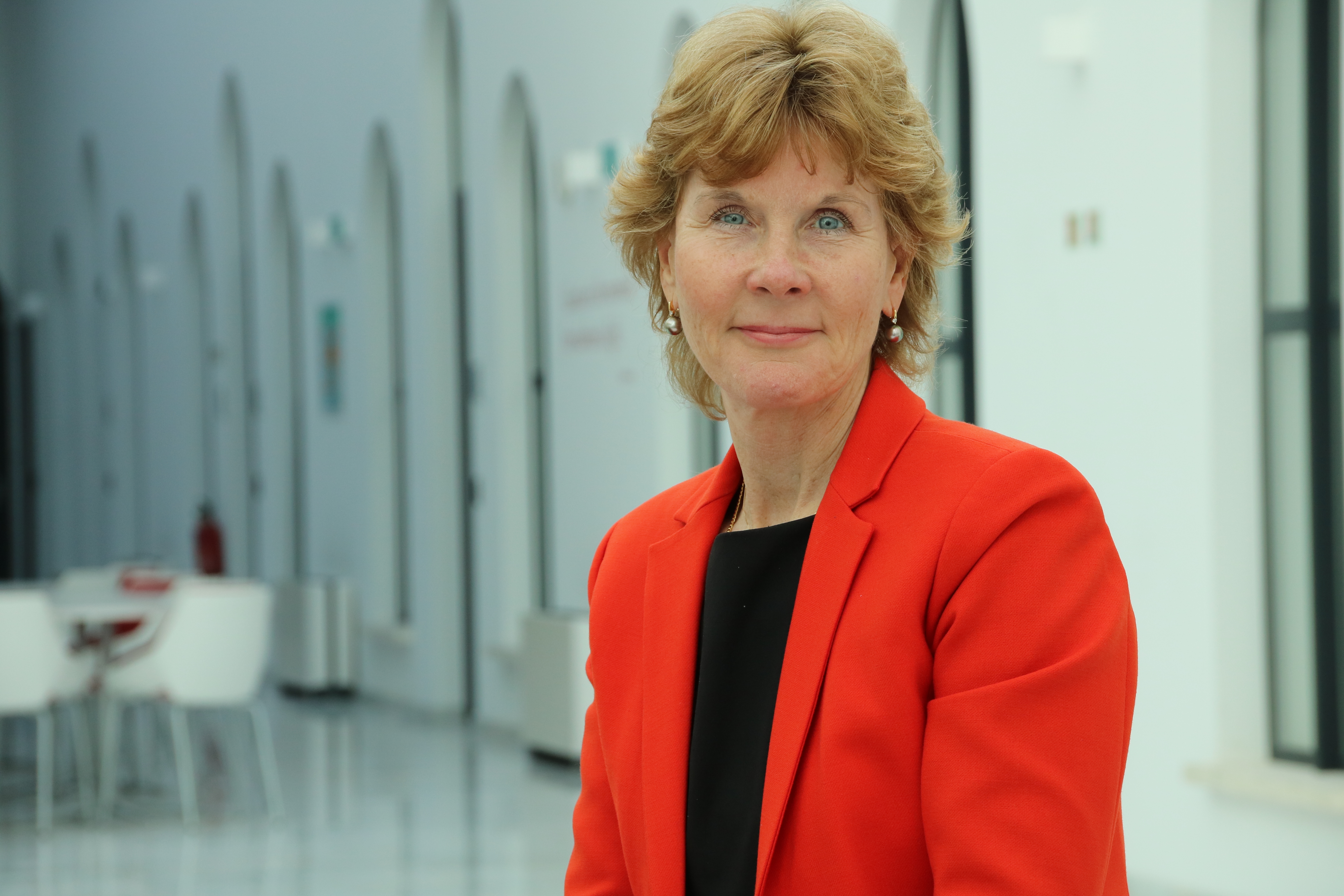
Professor Catherine Bachleda, Vice-Chancellor of the University of Gibraltar

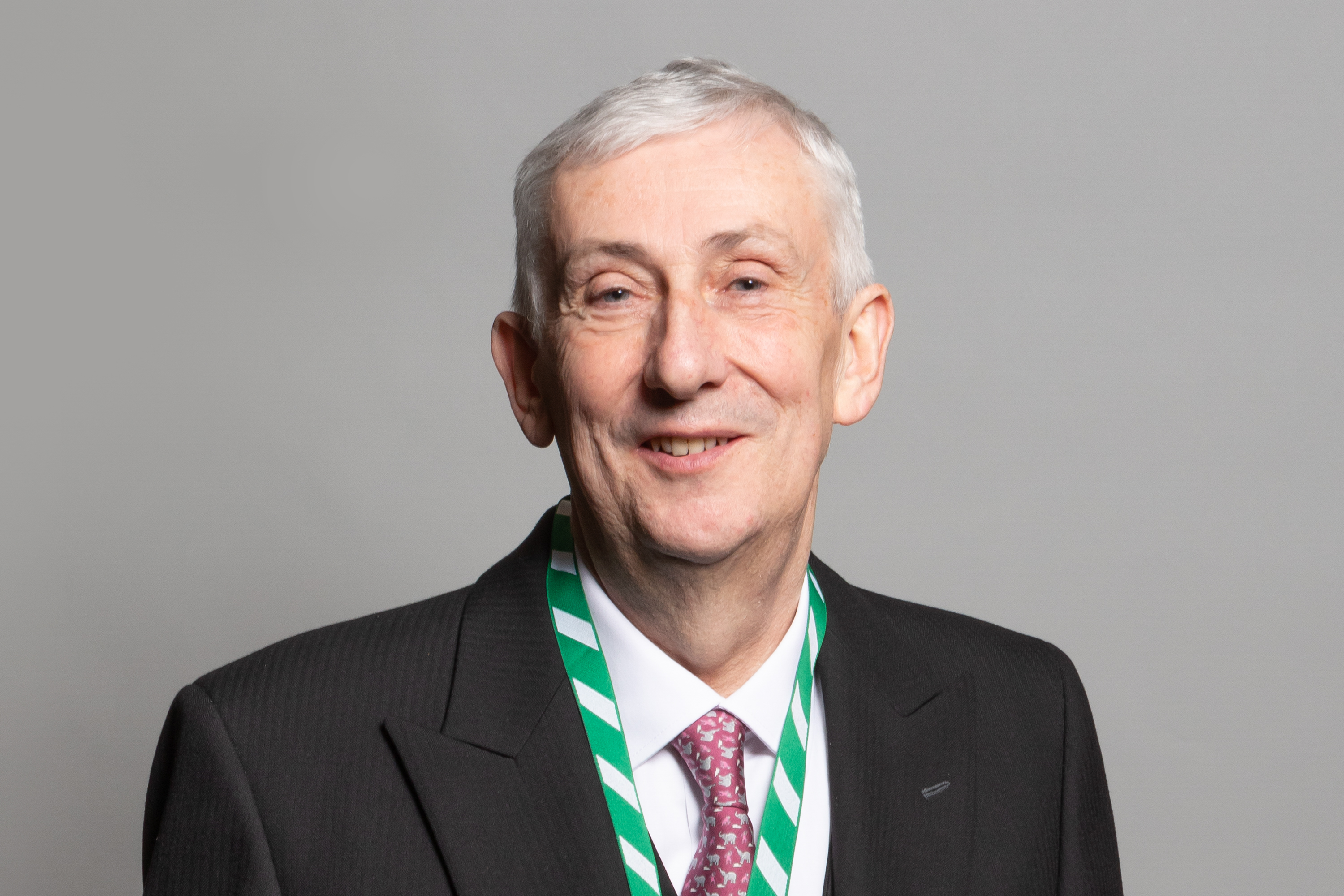
Sir Lindsay Hoyle, Chancellor of the University of Gibraltar

The formal head of the university is its chancellor, currently Sir Lindsay Hoyle (Speaker of the House of Commons in the UK Parliament). This is a largely ceremonial role. The Vice-Chancellor, Professor Catherine Bachleda, is responsible for the overall management of the university, supported by the Executive Committee composed of senior operational staff and directors. There are a number of boards and committees involved in the leadership and governance of the university.

The university's board of governors supervise the management, administration and control of the property, revenue and business of the University of Gibraltar. The Academic Board established through the University of Gibraltar (Academic Board) Regulations 2018, undertakes the academic governance of the university.

== Programmes and courses ==
The University of Gibraltar offers a number of undergraduate programmes, in the fields of business, nursing and maritime science; postgraduate programmes, in the fields of business, education and marine science; and Research-level programmes.

The University of Gibraltar also offers a number of short courses and professional development courses.

=== Scholarships ===
A number of scholarships are hosted or directly provided by the university, including the Parasol Scholarships for prospective students for the Bachelors of Business Administration (BBA), Gibraltar Commonwealth Scholarships, Europa Scholarships and Bursaries, and HM Government of Gibraltar Scholarships for residents.

== Research ==
The university has six main research hubs:

- Natural Sciences and Environment
- Business and Management
- History and Culture
- Education
- Gaming and Gambling
- Health and Sport Sciences

=== Beacon Professors ===
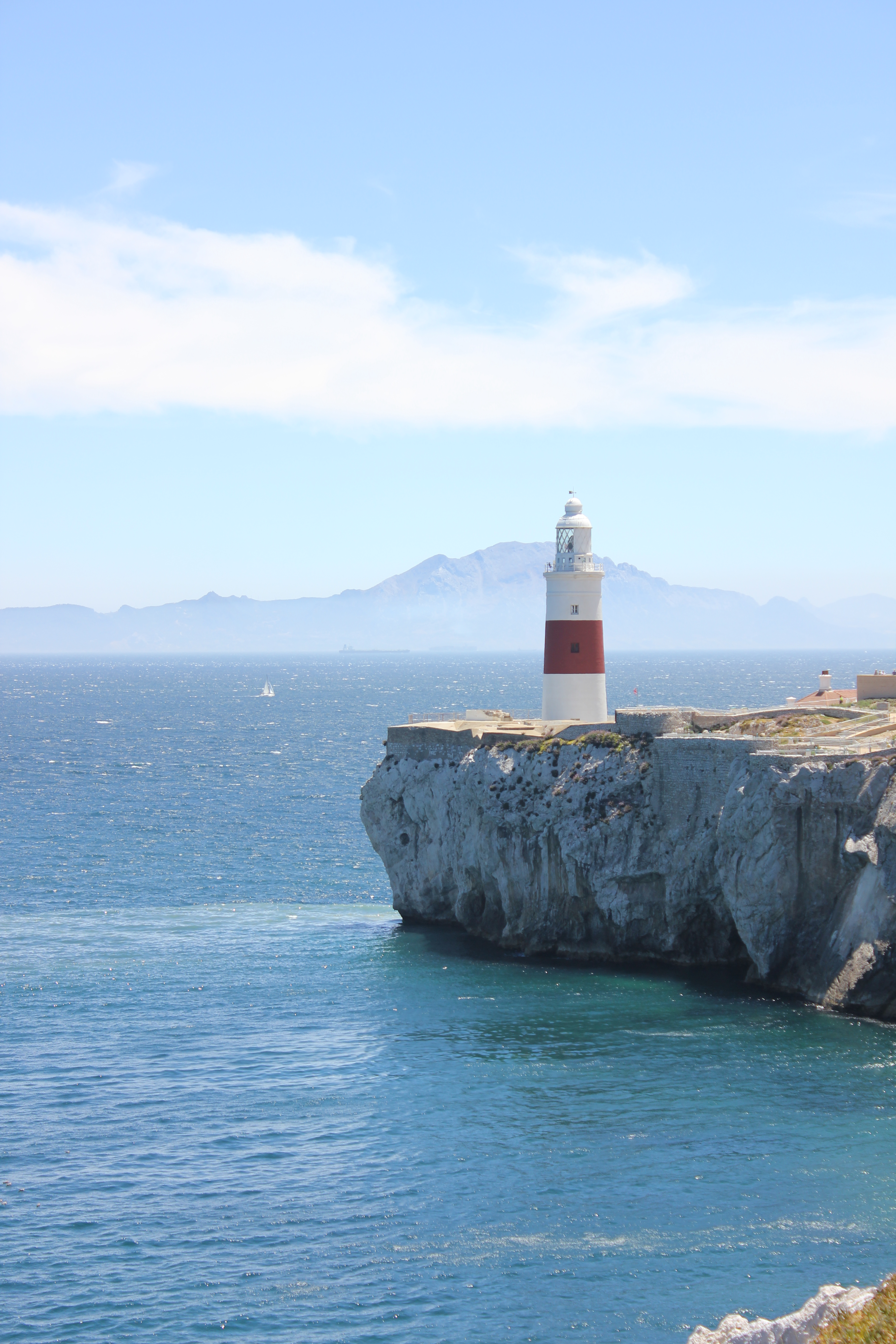
Europa Point Lighthouse.

Beacon Professor is a rare honorary title – represented symbolically at the Lighthouse at Europa Point – awarded to individuals whose standing in their fields of expertise acts as a ‘beacon’ to others. The current Beacon Professors are:

- John Cortes
- Clive Finlayson
- Jamie Trinidad
- Julia Fa

=== Parasol Library and Gibraltar Repository ===
As well as providing library and information services and study space for researchers and students the library is the home of the Gibraltar Repository. The libraries of the associate campuses of the university and other local collections are members of the Gibraltar Libraries Forum (GLF) whom together are developing the Gibraltar Repository – a joint online portal to their Gibraltar-related collections. Any material about Gibraltar or written by a Gibraltarian on any subject is eligible to be added to the repository.

== History ==
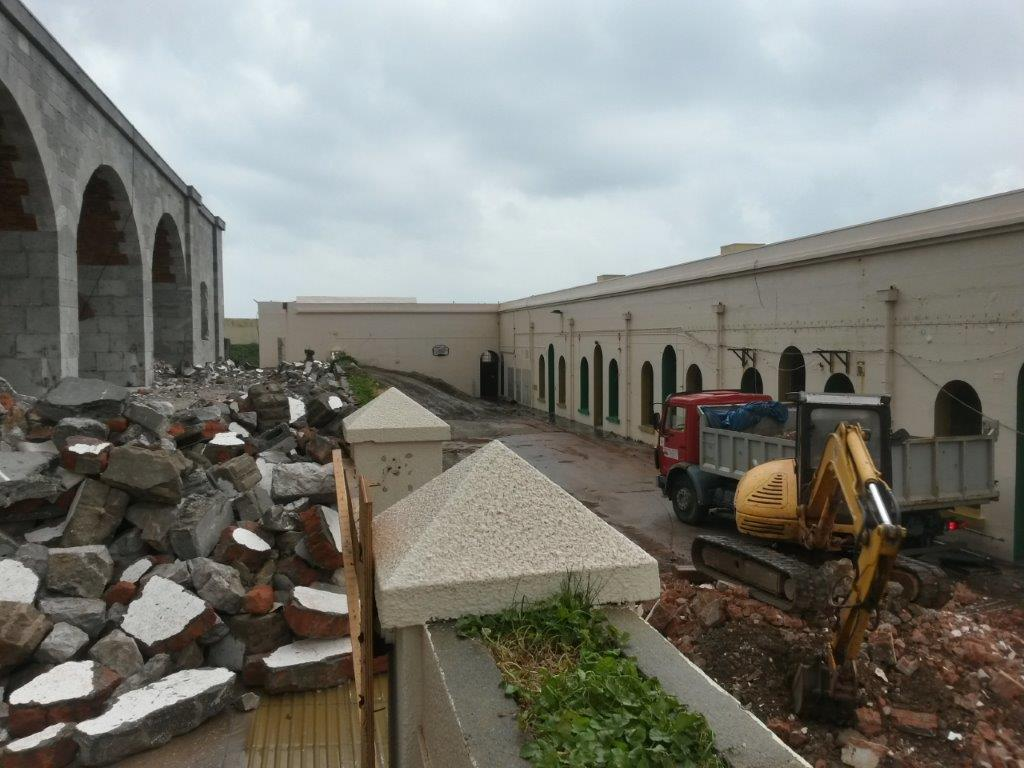
Atrium site before renovation.

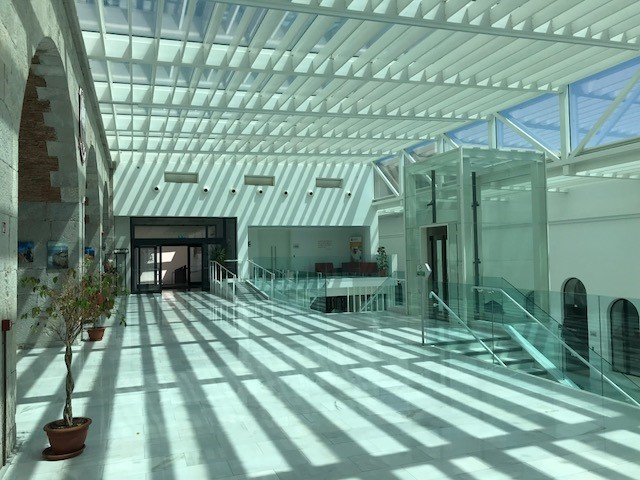
Post-renovation with the Atrium and accessibility lift added.

The university campus is at Europa Point on the Rock of Gibraltar.

The area includes what is thought to be a Moorish cistern, now known as the Nun's Well, though it could pre-date the arrival of Tarik in 711 AD. The earliest known inhabitants of the area though were the Neanderthals, and the nearby Gorham's Cave complex they occupied is a UNESCO World Heritage Site. In mythology Gibraltar is one of the Pillars of Hercules, standing astride the point at which the Atlantic Ocean meets the Mediterranean Sea.

There is archaeological evidence of Europa Point, the end of the known world in Classical times, being a place where ritual offerings were made, including during the Phoenician period. Today the site still holds religious significance as seen by the presence of the medieval Shrine of Our Lady of Europe (built over an earlier 14th century mosque) and the Ibrahim-al-Ibrahim Mosque, inaugurated in 1997.

Military heritage on the site includes Harding's Battery with an 1870s 12.5-inch 38 ton RML gun. The battery, buried under a mound of sand for years was refurbished in 2010, and its underground magazine vaults turned into a visitor centre with information panels on the history of the area.

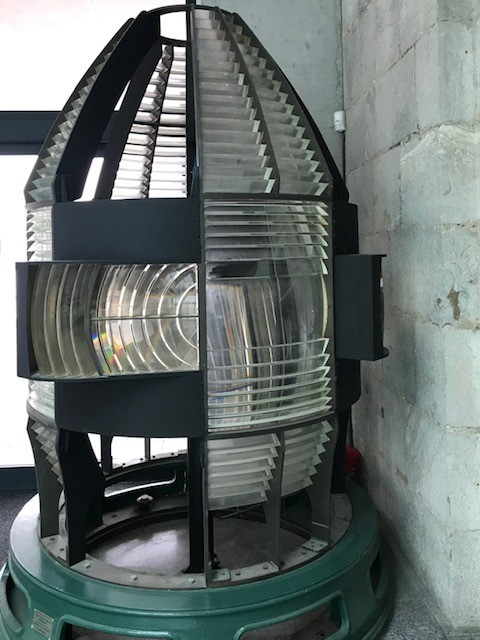
The second order optic Fresnel lens now on display in the University of Gibraltar.

Another prominent feature of the site, overlooking the Strait of Gibraltar and with symbolic significance to the university, is the Europa Point Lighthouse. It is the most southerly lighthouse operated by Trinity House. When it was automated in 2016 the 1950s second-order optic Fresnel Lens was donated to the university and is on display in the main concourse.

The buildings of the university's Europa Point campus were part of the southern defences of the Rock of Gibraltar. The bombproof barracks which now house the principal rooms of the university were constructed by the Royal Engineers in 1841 and feature finely executed terracotta brick-tile vaulted ceilings supported by massive square limestone pillars. The window ledges alone are over a metre (yard) thick. The ashlar stone blocks used in the construction were probably imported from Portugal. The rougher masonry used is of local limestone. Once separated by open space a second defensible barracks, built into the sea-wall defences themselves, forms the most southerly part of the campus. After a period of being used as a school in the 1980s the buildings fell out of use until the ambitious restoration and development plan to turn the site into the home of Gibraltar's first university was implemented.

Local architects Xavier Ozores Pardo and Pedro Carcelen Fernandez won the design competition. Work got underway in early 2015 and was completed within seven months of the commission.

A marble-tiled, glass-roofed light and airy Atrium forms the centrepiece of the renovated buildings, bringing together the separate parts into a coherent whole. Other additions include integrating outbuildings into a range of offices surrounding a peaceful courtyard. The restoration work was recognised when the university became the recipient of the 2015 Heritage Award from the Gibraltar Heritage Trust. The original buildings are listed under the Heritage and Antiquities Act 2018, ensuring their continued protection.

=== University coat-of-arms ===
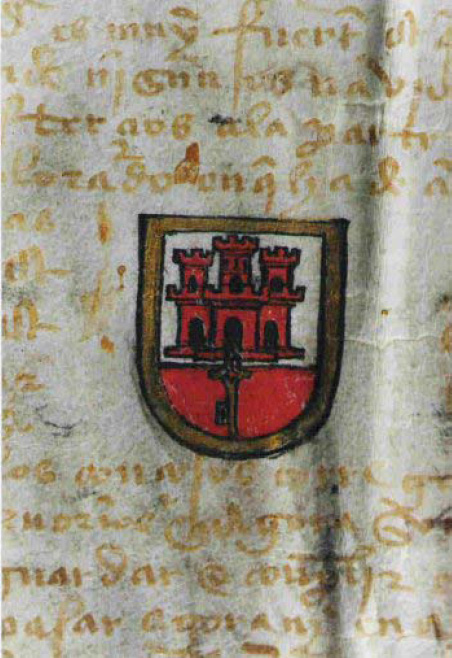
Original coat-of-arms designed by Isabella I, Queen of Castile, and granted to Gibraltar in 1502.

The university's coat of arms is based on the coat of arms of Gibraltar which were designed by Isabella I, Queen of Castile, and granted to Gibraltar in 1502, featuring a castle and key. The university motto Scientia est Clavis ad Successum translates as ‘Knowledge is the Key to Success’.

=== Chancellors and vice-chancellors of the University of Gibraltar ===
==== Chancellors ====
2019–present	The Right Honourable Sir Lindsay Hoyle
2015–2019	The Right Honourable The Lord Luce (Founding Chancellor)

==== Vice-chancellors ====
2018–present	Professor Catherine Bachleda
2015–2018	Professor Daniella Tilbury
