= Christian Brothers School, Gibraltar =

Coordinates: 36°8′20.47″N 5°21′2.47″W

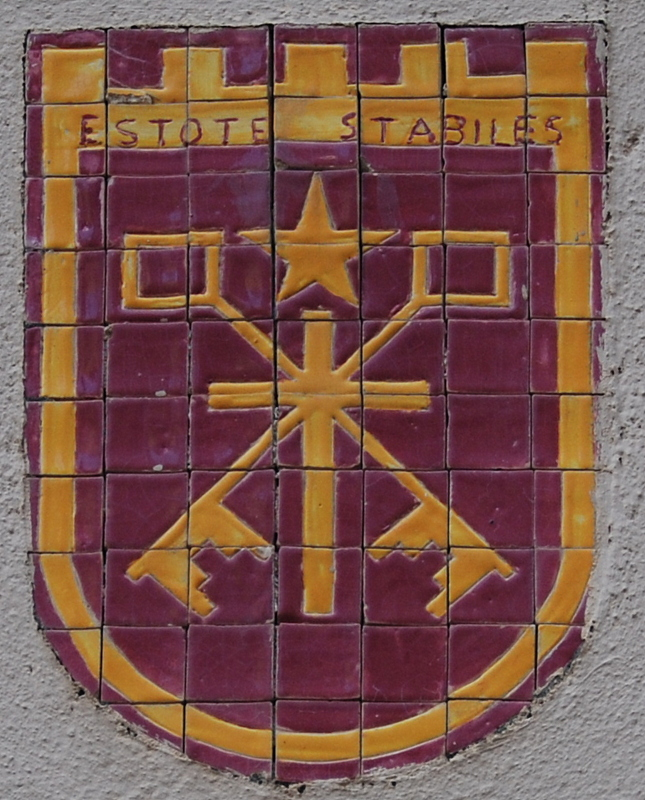
The Grammar School Badge on the wall in 2013

The Christian Brothers School was a school in the British Overseas Territory of Gibraltar. The school was a technical school in the 1930s and in 1950 became the Gibraltar Grammar School until comprehensive education was introduced in the 1970s. The building was then home to the Sacred Heart Middle School but was no longer run by the Congregation of Christian Brothers. In July 2015, the Sacred Heart Middle School became the Saint Bernard's Middle School and moved to a different location. The building was renovated and now houses Prior Park School, Gibraltar's first co-educational, Catholic independent secondary school. Prior Park School is the fourth school in the Prior Park family, the other three being located in Bath and Wiltshire, UK.

== History ==
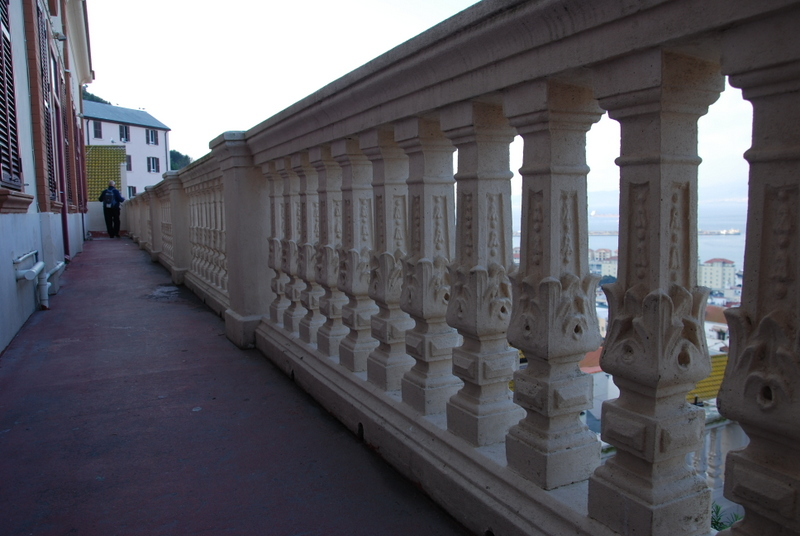
The verandah today showing the view of Gibraltar Harbour

It had its origins when the Christian Brothers arrived in Gibraltar on 28 October 1835 and set up a school there. When the Brothers arrived on the Rock, some 260 pupils were dependent upon a mock school set up at Gunners' Parade, and reported that the children were "extremely ignorant, without any knowledge of the English language, thus making it next to impossible for the Brothers to use their English textbooks for their instruction." Others reported that the real reason was that the brothers could not speak Spanish and the children had not learnt English. This new school was to be a Catholic School unlike the public one in Flat Bastion Road and the Methodist School run by William Harris Rule and his wife.

The Christian Brothers were always associated with the building at Sacred Heart Terrace which was originally constructed in 1884 with funds from the Bishop and the Government. By 1891 the school building and the grounds had been extended.

The "Line Wall College" (The old Hassans Building) was noted in 1930 for the education that it supplied to "well to do" children.

In 1950 the Gibraltar Grammar School moved to the Sacred Heart Terrace with the brothers still in charge and the building was extended in the 1960s. Comprehensive education was introduced in Gibraltar in the 1970s and the school eventually closed and the building was closed too in 1977 and abandoned. The brothers received the Freedom of the City on 25 June 1977, and left Gibraltar shortly after. They numbered only five at the time of their departure, but the Christian Brothers had educated generations of boys, and the people of Gibraltar showed their appreciation of the brothers through many ceremonies and celebrations. One newspaper headline read, "Selfless Service to Generations of Gibraltarians."

Today the old building is refurbished and it is used by Prior Park School.
