= Gibraltar National Museum =

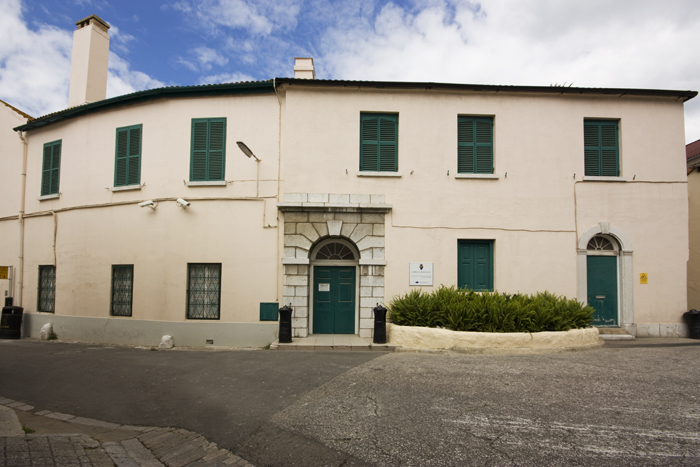
- Ordnance House or "Bomb House", home to the Gibraltar National Museum.

- Location within Gibraltar
- Established: 24 July 1930
- Location: Ordnance House, 18–20 Bomb House Lane, Gibraltar
- Coordinates: 36.1390°N 5.3544°W
- Type: National museum
- Director: Prof. Clive Finlayson
- Website: gibmuseum.gi

The Gibraltar National Museum is a national museum of the history, culture and natural history of Gibraltar located within the city centre of the British overseas territory of Gibraltar. Founded in 1930 by the then Governor of Gibraltar, General Sir Alexander Godley, the museum houses an array of displays portraying The Rock's millennia-old history and the unique culture of its people. The museum also incorporates the remains of a 14th-century Moorish bathhouse. Its director since 1991 is Prof. Clive Finlayson.

== History ==
=== Background ===
There were several unsuccessful attempts to establish a museum in Gibraltar during the 19th century. Significant local finds could not be kept on The Rock because there was no museum, resulting in the first known adult Neanderthal skull (the so-called Gibraltar skull) went to the Natural History Museum in London. This was the second Neanderthal fossil to be found and was excavated in 1848 at Forbes' Quarry on the north face of the Rock of Gibraltar.

The first known collection established in Gibraltar was due to the Reverend John White, chaplain at Gibraltar from 1756 to 1774. Encouraged by his elder brother Gilbert White, he collected zoological specimens which he studied and sent to England. He took advice from Giovanni Antonio Scopoli and also later wrote in England, what is considered the first detailed zoological account of Gibraltar. However, Fauna Calpensis was never published, and it and his collections are now lost. The next known recording of something that could resemble a museum dates from 1830. St Bernard's Hospital is recognised to have had a room for specimens of natural history and morbid anatomy. Again, no remains of such collection are kept.

The first proposal to open a museum in Gibraltar was discussed in 1835 at a meeting of the Gibraltar Scientific Society – a group of British Army officers who met at the Garrison Library. The first museum was established and housed in rented accommodation. The museum became so important that the society changed its name to the Museum Society. One of the milestones of the existence of the Society was the presentation of the Gibraltar skull on 3 March 1848, although its importance was not recognised at the time, it was to the Society, by its secretary, Lieutenant Edmund Flint of the Royal Artillery.

=== Foundation ===
The museum's establishment is credited to General Sir Alexander Godley, who was installed as Governor of Gibraltar in 1928. Upon his arrival, he gave an opening address in which he highlighted his reformist aims, which would: "help to restore [Gibraltar] to its prosperity which had been showing signs of waning". One of the elements of this reformist mission was the creation of a national museum. After nine months in office, on 30 July 1929, the Gibraltar Society was launched. Its primary objective was to assist the colonial authorities in the foundation of a museum. Godley was able to get two adjacent military quarters for use as a museum. The choice was fortunate as under one of them, Ordnance House, the former residence of the assistant director of Ordnance Stores, lay chambers of a bathhouse from the Moorish period, which had been used as a semi-underground stable.

The Gibraltar Museum was opened on 24 July 1930 and on the first anniversary (10 July 1931), the Gibraltar Museum Ordinance was passed as "An Ordinance relating to Ancient Monuments and Antiquities and to provide for the management of the Gibraltar Museum".

In the 1970s, the Gibraltar Museum housed the first office of the Gibraltar Ornithological & Natural History Society (GONHS). Founders of the organisation included then curator of the museum Joaquin Bensusan and Clive Finlayson, the current museum director.

=== Name change ===
In 2018, the Heritage Trust Act 1989, which provided the legal framework for the management of the museum, was replaced with the Heritage and Antiquities Act 2018. The new legislation updated the name of the museum to officially recognise it as the national museum of Gibraltar.

== Displays ==
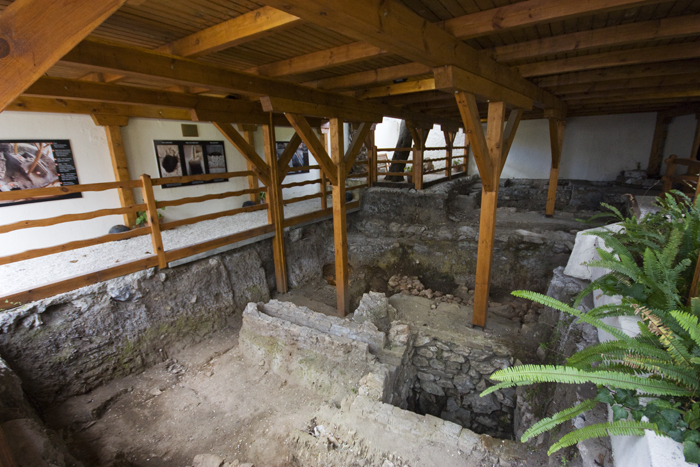
An open-air archaeological exhibit at the Gibraltar National Museum.

=== The Gibraltarian ===
Rooms dedicated to Gibraltarian social history.

=== Cinema ===
Film about the history of Gibraltar.

=== The Rock – world symbol for three millennia ===
Rooms dedicated to The Rock as a symbol, from the Pillars of Hercules to today including Phoenician and Carthaginian collections.

=== Natural history and prehistory ===
Rooms devoted to the natural history of Gibraltar including reconstructions of past landscapes, walk-in cave and Neanderthals.

=== Marine biodiversity ===
A room dedicated to the variety of marine species living around Gibraltar's coastline.

=== The Great Siege ===
Room dedicated to the Great Siege of Gibraltar (1779–1783). This was an unsuccessful attempt by Spain and France to capture Gibraltar from the British during the American War of Independence. This was the largest action fought during the war in terms of numbers, particularly the Grand Assault of 18 September 1782. At three years and seven months, it is the longest siege endured by the British Armed Forces.

=== Rock model ===
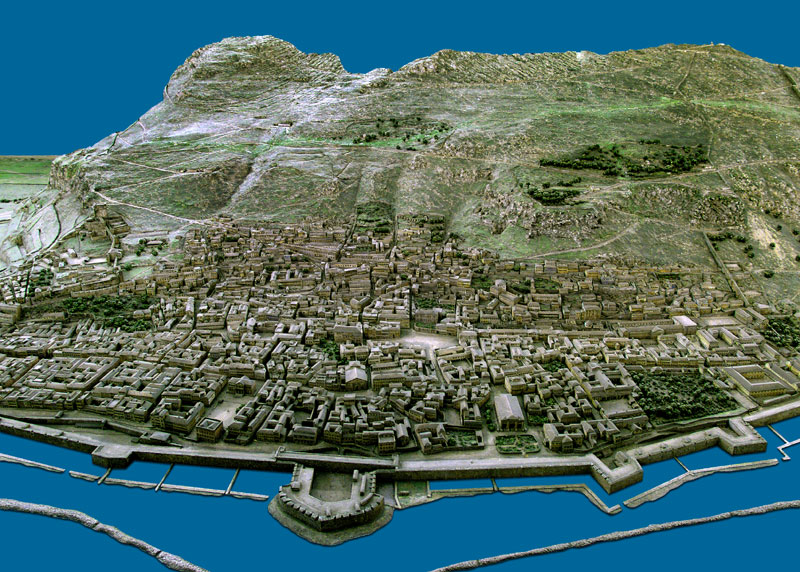
A sample photograph showing how the model includes every house and roadway.

The John Fernandez Rooms include a 8 metres (26 ft) long scale model of Gibraltar and also includes old photographs of Gibraltar. The model was completed in 1865 from a survey by Lieut. Charles Warren R.E. who later took a leading role in the Jack the Ripper investigations. It was made at the direction of Major General Edward Charles Frome R.E. and painted by Captain B.A. Branfill in 1868.

=== Calpe gallery ===
Devoted to The Rock's Latin name, Calpe. A 19th-century fox hunt and a Royal Navy reserve unit.

=== Urban excavations ===
A room containing medieval artefacts excavated within the city of Gibraltar.

=== External excavation ===
An open-air excavation covering seven centuries of Gibraltar's history.

== Moorish baths ==
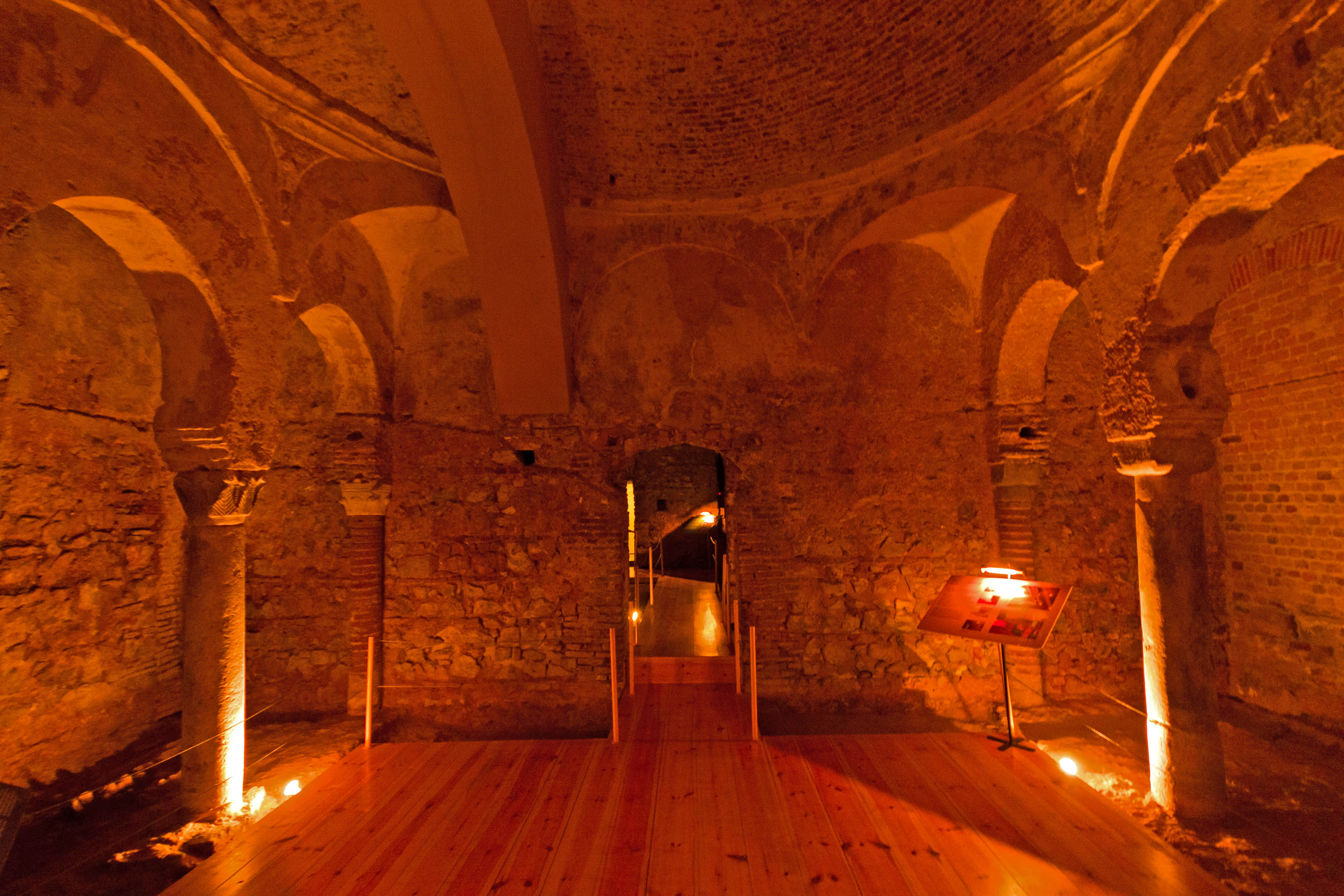
Central room of the Moorish Baths at the Gibraltar National Museum.

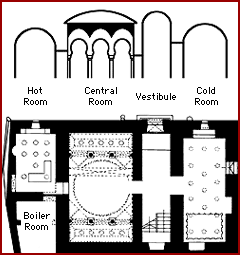
Plan of the Moorish Baths in Gibraltar.

Located within the museum's basement level lie the remains of a Moorish bath house built around the 14th century during the rule of Marinid dynasty. These private baths are known to have been within the Palace of the Governor of Gibraltar. The building was used as stables while the building was under control of the British military with a floor of one of the rooms was raised so high that horse-drawn coaches could be moved into the remaining space in the room. The site is now smaller than it was originally as the building suffered extensive damage during the Great Siege of Gibraltar. It is one of the best-preserved Moorish bath houses in Europe. In 1906, Mr. Budgett Meakin, an authority on Moorish antiquities, wrote of these baths:

Except in the Alhambra there is nothing in Spain to compare with it; and in Morocco such baths may not be entered by Nazarenes or Jews, so that its interest is exceptional.

Excavations in the museum's garden revealed a water conduit, dating to the Spanish period. This conduit enters the garden from Line Wall Road and is thought to have run off an aqueduct that run along that road from wells south of the town. It then runs through the rooms and into a cistern under the interior patio.

The baths consist of rooms similar to the Roman Hypocaust system of baths with a normal temperature room for undressing, a cold room and a hot room. Channels under the floor would allow warm air to circulate as a form of underfloor heating. This process of bathing would act like modern saunas whereby moving between hot and cold temperatures cleanses the body by sweating.

== Projects ==
- Gibraltar Caves Project

== Curators/directors ==
- M. McEwen (1952–1965)
- David C. Devenish (1967–1970)
- Joaquin Bensusan (1970–)
- Prof. Clive Finlayson (1991–present)

== See also ==
- History of Gibraltar
- British Museum
- Natural History Museum
