= 2023 Gibraltar general election =

- 12 October 2023

All 17 seats in the Gibraltar Parliament 9 seats needed for a majority
- Turnout: 76.40% (▲5.56pp)
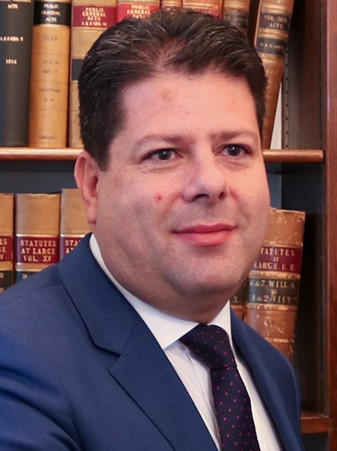

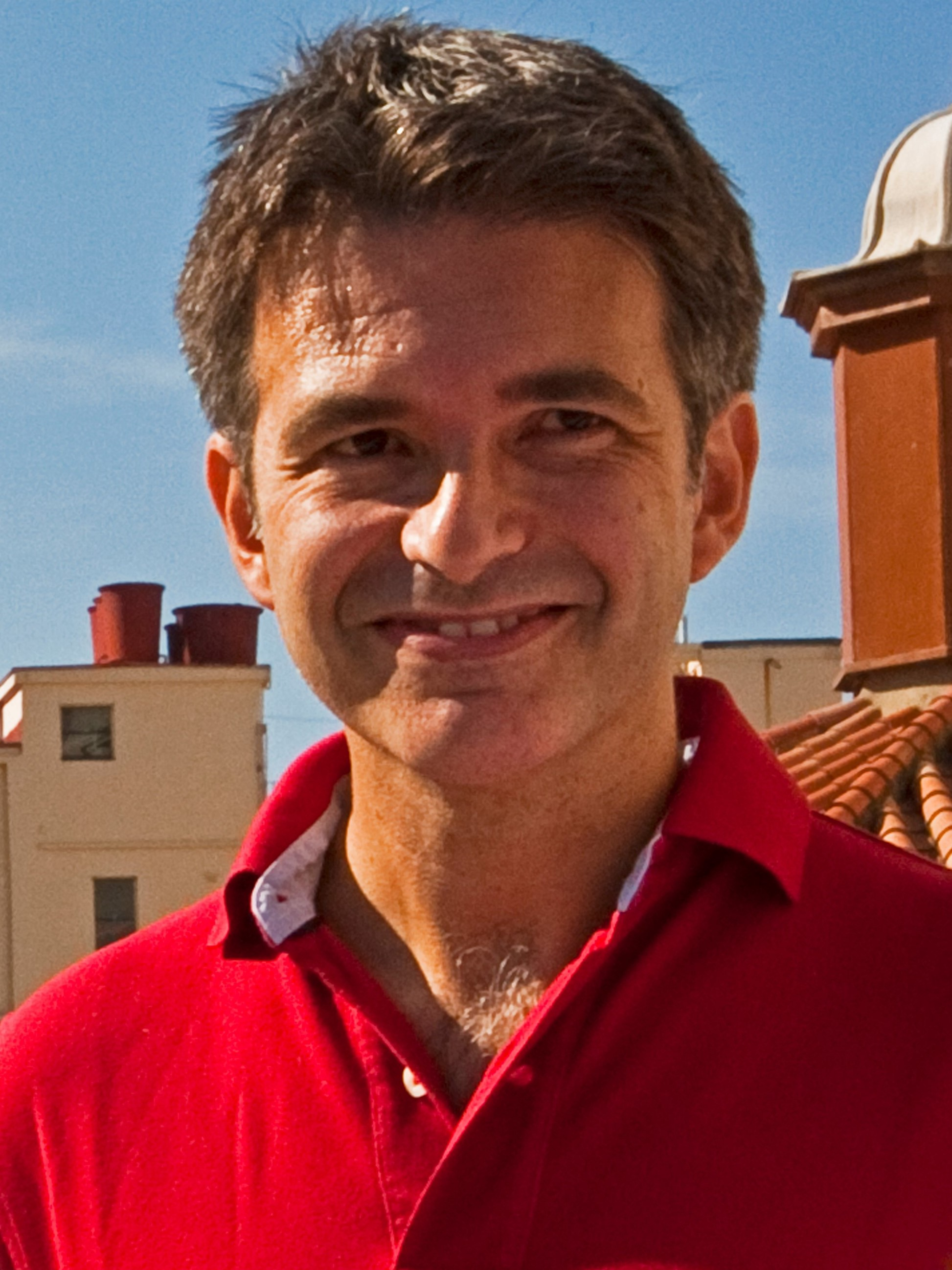
	First party	Second party
Leader	Fabian Picardo	Keith Azopardi
Party	Socialist Labour	Social Democrats
Alliance	GSLP–Liberal
Last election	52.50%, 10 seats	25.55%, 6 seats
Seats won	9	8
Seat change	▼1	▲2
Popular vote	89,941	86,537
Percentage	50.04%	48.15%
Swing	▼2.46pp	▲22.6pp
Chief Minister before election
Fabian Picardo
Socialist Labour
Elected Chief Minister
Fabian Picardo
Socialist Labour

General elections were held in Gibraltar on 12 October 2023 to elect all 17 members of the fifth Gibraltar Parliament. This was the first election in Gibraltar's history to use an electronic voting count system. The GSLP–Liberal Alliance narrowly secured a fourth term in office, though it saw its majority reduced to one seat, whilst the GSD became the sole opposition party, gaining two seats (one by unseating the Alliance's Minister of Business and Tourism Vijay Daryanani and taking one from the non-contesting party, Together Gibraltar, which had been held by Marlene Hassan-Nahon).

== Background ==
On 24 August 2020 it was announced that Government MP and Minister, Gilbert Licudi, would resign as Minister but remain as MP backbencher. Later, on 17 July 2023, he announced he would step down for re-election.

On 14 June 2023 it was announced that Together Gibraltar founder and leader and her party's sole MP, Marlene Hassan-Nahon (daughter of Gibraltar's first Mayor and Chief Minister, Joshua Hassan), would not stand for the elections and would leave politics by then.

On 5 September 2023 ongoing negotiations between Together Gibraltar and the GSD to form an electoral pact were finally abandoned.

On 13 September 2023 it was announced that GSD MP, Elliott Phillips, would not stand for re-election and that Robert Vazquez will return as an independent MP candidate. On 15 September 2023 it was announced that Paul Balban, Albert Isola and Samantha Sacramento, GSLP/Libs Government MPs and Ministers, would not stand for re-election.

On 16 September it was announced that GSD MP, Daniel Feetham, would not stand for re-election.

On 17 September the GSLP have announced their new four candidates for the elections: Hassans' Legal Partner and Head of Financial Services, Nigel Feetham KC (brother of outgoing GSD MP, Daniel Feetham and son of former GSLP MP and Minister from 1988 to 1996, Michael Feetham); former teacher and Miss Gibraltar 1974, Patricia Orfila; Director of the Gibraltar Academy of Music and Performing Arts (GAMPA) and former Mayor of Gibraltar, Christian Santos and Hassans' Legal Partner and Solicitor, Gemma Arias-Vasquez.

On 18 September it was announced that Together Gibraltar would not contest the election. Interim Leader, Nicky Calamaro, said it was because of lack of support from the voters since Marlene's departure, resulting on TG to restart itself as a pressure group to regain trust of the people, but he didn't rule out the possibility of being an independent candidate.

On that same night the GSD announced their 6 new candidates with 3x women (TSN's Senior Law Associate and Barrister and GSD's executive member and 2019 election candidate Joelle Ladislaus; RGP's ((Royal Gibraltar Police)) Senior Compliance Officer, Head of Special Needs Action Group ((SNAG)) and GSD executive, Atrish Sanchez and inaugural former Vice-Chancellor and CEO of University of Gibraltar, Daniella Tilbury); 1x Moroccan born-Gibraltarian Muslim male and GSD executive and Future member (Youseff El Hana); GSD executive (Formerly Together Gibraltar executive member) and candidate of TG in 2019 (Craig Sacarello) and chairman of GSD Future and Isolas' Law Associate, Giovanni Origo. On 19 September, it was announced that Liberal Party of Gibraltar MP and Minister, Steven Linares, would not stand for re-election, after 23 years of being an MP, and would be replaced by GHA's (Gibraltar Health Authority) Emergency Medical Technician, Leslie Bruzon of the same party.

On 14 September both businessman Allan Asquez and retired teacher Patricia Orfila put their names forward for GSLP executives to consider them as candidates. Allan said he had been motivated by issues including social housing and secure employment, especially for people with learning difficulties. However, on 17 September, shortly before the candidate selection process, he announced that he had withdrawn his application and left the party. Speaking on the 'Gibraltar Today' section on GBC's Radio Gibraltar, he alleged that he did what he did because the party's leader and Chief Minister, Fabian Picardo, had allegedly conveyed to him that he did not want Allan to be selected and told the executive members not to vote for him, arguing that it broke the democratic process selection. He also alleged that if the executive members voted for him, Fabian Picardo would step down as party leader and/or Chief Minister. He also allegedly stated that he was threatened by Picardo that he would seek him as a backbencher rather than a minister if elected into Government.

On 21 September GSD candidate Youssef El Hana apologised, on GBC's Viewpoint, to Gibraltar's Jewish community for 'offensive language' used on social media from 2018, regarding national and religious conflicts between Palestine and Israel. Reacting to his apology, the Chair of the Charity, Learning from Auschwitz Gibraltar, Naomi Hassan-Weisfogel, said that he marched in the UK calling for the destruction of Israel in support of Palestine and that he had made these offensive posts for months, for which the march, Youseff denies.

On 5 November 2024 Paul Balban revealed to GBC's City Pulse that he originally suggested to himself that he should contest the elections as an independent candidate, in order to gauge his environmental policies, which had faced public backlash at the time he served his last term as Transport Minister.

== Timing and procedure ==
Under section 38(2) of the Gibraltar Constitution Order 2006, the Parliament must be dissolved four years after its first meeting following the last election (unless the Chief Minister advises the Governor of Gibraltar to dissolve parliament sooner). Under section 37 of the Constitution, writs for a general election must be issued within thirty days of the dissolution and the general election must then be held no later than three months after the issuing of a writ.

On 12 September 2023 Chief Minister Fabian Picardo formally asked Governor Sir David Steel to dissolve parliament and an election to take place on 12 October 2023.

== Opinion polls ==
Note: This was Panaroma's last opinion polling article before they dissolved in April 2024.

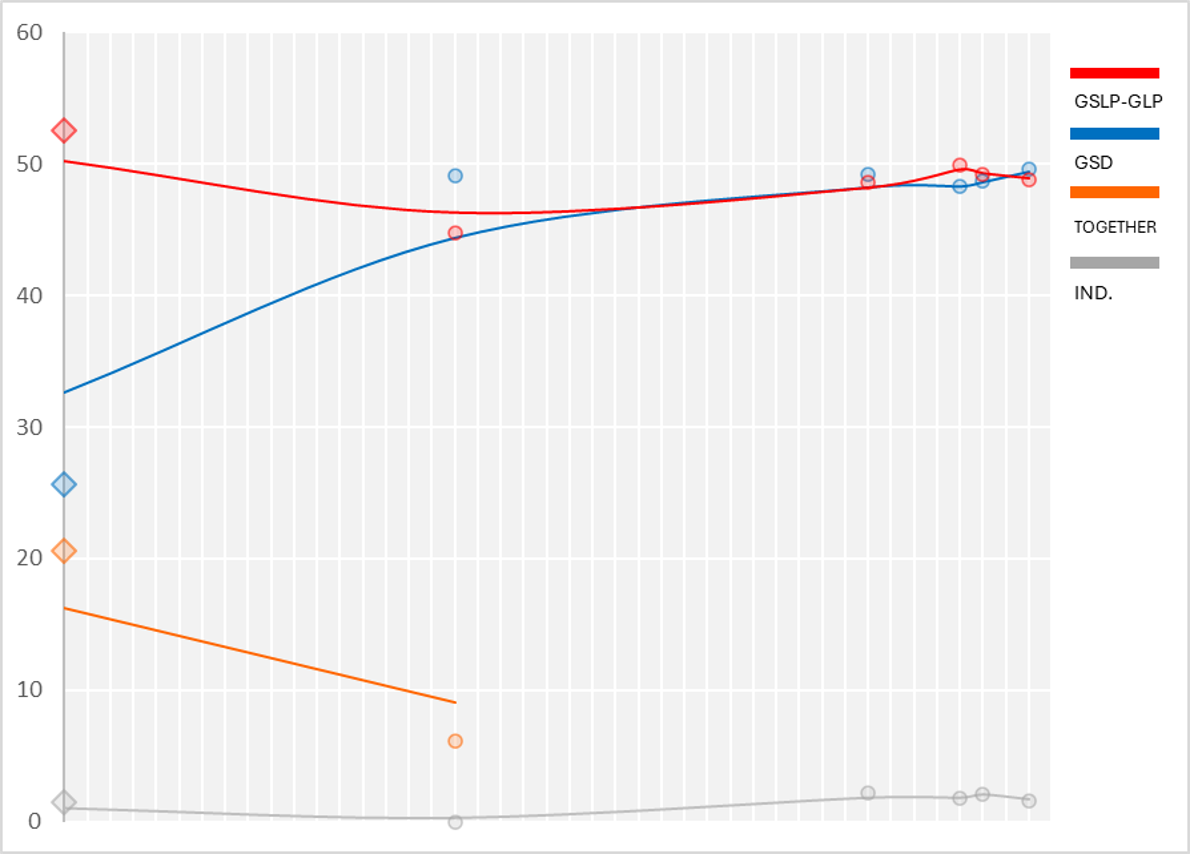
Trend lines graph

Release date	Publisher(s)	Sample size	GSLP/Libs	GSD	TG	Ind.	Split vote	Blank/ not used	Don't know/ undecided	Lead	Source
12 October 2023	GBC Exit Poll	1,403	48.8% 8	49.6% 9	–	1.6%	–	–	–	0.8%	
10 October 2023 (Note: No exact number of votes or sample size were mentioned in this particular poll or respective article. In this poll, the following candidates would not be elected (in the following order from higher to lower rankings): Giovanni Origo (GSD), Youssef El Hana (GSD), Vijay Daryanani (GSLP/Liberals), & Robert Vasquez (Independent))	Panorama	–	49.2% 9	48.7% 8	–	2.1%	–	–	–	0.5%	
9 October 2023 (Note: In these polls published by the joint GBC/Chronicle, the following candidates would not be elected: Joe Bossano (GSLP/Liberals), Vijay Daryanani (GSLP/Liberals), Youssef El Hana (GSD), & Robert Vasquez (Independent).)	GBC/Chronicle	600	49.9% 8	48.3% 9	–	1.8%	–	9%	–	1.6%	
5 October 2023	GBC/Chronicle	600	48.65; 8	49.18% 9	–	2.17%	–	18%	–	0.53%	
17 September 2023 (Note: Poll published prior to the official declaration of competing candidates)	GBC	1,100	21.64%	23.72%	2.98%	–	12.26%	8.03%	31.38%	2.08%	

In the initial opinion poll by GBC (released on 17 September 2023), the issues likely to influence votes are reported as the following:

- Cost of Living (47.79%),
- Health Care (45%),
- EU Treaty (33.63%),
- Economy (32.91%),
- Housing (31.2%),
- Cleanliness (24.17%),
- Public Services (19.3%),
- Family Life (17.58%),
- Climate Change (17.13%),
- Crime (15.06%),
- Foreign Policy (14.79%),
- Transport (12.62%),
- McGrail Inquiry (12.26%),
- Development (10.64%),
- Diversity & Inclusion (4.24%)

== Incumbent members (from 2019) ==
Candidate	Party	Parliamentary role(s)	Seeking re-election?
Fabian Picardo (since 2003)	GSLP–Liberal Alliance (GSLP)	Chief Minister (since December 2011); Leader of GSLP & Alliance (since April 2011)	Yes
Joseph Garcia (since 1999) (Note: Elected in 1999 by-election after the death of elected GSLP MP and Shadow Minister & former Mayor of Gibraltar, Robert Mor)	GSLP–Liberal Alliance (LPG)	Deputy Chief Minister (since 2011); Leader of LPG (since 1992)	Yes
John Cortes (since 2011)	GSLP–Liberal Alliance (GSLP)	Minister for the Environment, Sustainability and Climate Change	Yes
Albert Isola (since 2013) (Note: Elected in 2013 by-election after the death of elected MP and Minister for Housing and the Elderly, Charles Bruzon.)	GSLP–Liberal Alliance (GSLP)	Minister for Digital and Financial Services	No
Joseph Bossano (since 1972)	GSLP–Liberal Alliance (GSLP) (since 1980)	Minister for Economic Development, Enterprise, Telecommunications and the Gibraltar Savings Bank; Founder & previous leader of GSLP (1980–2011); Former leader of Alliance (2000–2011)	Yes
Gilbert Licudi (since 2007)	GSLP–Liberal Alliance (GSLP)	Minister for Education, Employment, Utilities and the Port (2019–2020); Backbencher (since 2020)	No
Steven Linares (since 2000)	GSLP–Liberal Alliance (LPG)	Minister for Housing, Youth and Sport	No
Paul Balban (since 2011)	GSLP–Liberal Alliance (GSLP)	Minister for Health and Care	No
Samantha Sacramento (since 2011)	GSLP–Liberal Alliance (GSLP)	Minister for Justice, Multiculturalism, Equality and Community Affairs	No
Vijay Daryanani	GSLP–Liberal Alliance (LPG)	Minister for Business, Tourism and Transport	Yes
Marlene Hassan-Nahon (since 2015)	Together Gibraltar (since 2019)	Opposition MP for Together Gibraltar; Founder and former leader of TG (2017–June 2023)	No
Damon Bossino (2011–2015; since 2019)	Gibraltar Social Democrats	Shadow Minister for Housing, Lands & Transport	Yes
Daniel Feetham (since 2007)	Gibraltar Social Democrats	Shadow Minister for Care, Opportunity & Justice; Previous Leader of GSD and Opposition (2011–2017)	No
Keith Azopardi (1996–2003; since 2019)	Gibraltar Social Democrats	Leader of the Opposition (since 2017); Leader of GSD (since 2017)	Yes
Roy Clinton (since 2015)	Gibraltar Social Democrats	Deputy Leader of the Opposition & Shadow Minister for Finance & Value for Money; Former Interim Leader of GSD and Opposition (2017)	Yes
Elliott Phillips (since 2015)	Gibraltar Social Democrats	Shadow Minister for Environment, Transport & Health	No
Edwin Reyes (since 2007)	Gibraltar Social Democrats	Shadow Minister for Education, Employment, Culture & Sport	Yes
Source: Parliament of Gibraltar

== Parties and candidates ==
Party or alliance	Ideology	Current Seats	Slogan	Election Logo
GSLP/Libs Alliance	Social Democracy, Social Liberalism	10	"Keep Gibraltar Safe"	
GSD	Liberal Conservatism, British Unionism	6	"Make The Change For A Bright Future"	
Robert Vasquez (Independent)	Social Democracy	N/A	"Vote Vasquez Get FACTS (Fairness, Accountability, Community, Transparency, Stability)"	

== Results ==
Party or alliance		Votes	%	Seats	+/–
Alliance	Gibraltar Socialist Labour Party	63,700	35.44	7	0
Alliance	Liberal Party of Gibraltar	26,241	14.60	2	–1
Alliance	Total	89,941	50.04	9	–1
Gibraltar Social Democrats		86,537	48.15	8	+2
Ind. Robert Vasquez		3,262	1.81	0	0
Total		179,740	100.00	17	0
Valid votes		18,784	97.55		
Invalid/blank votes		472	2.45		
Total votes		19,256	100.00		
Registered voters/turnout		25,200	76.41		
Source: Parliament, Chronicle

=== By candidate ===
Candidate	Party	Alliance	Votes	Notes
Joseph Garcia	LPG	GSLP–Liberal Alliance	9,852	Elected
Fabian Picardo	GSLP	GSLP–Liberal Alliance	9,844	Elected
Keith Azopardi	GSD	-	9,607	Elected
Damon Bossino	GSD	-	9,602	Elected
Nigel Feetham	GSLP	GSLP–Liberal Alliance	9,298	Elected
Gemma Arias-Vasquez	GSLP	GSLP–Liberal Alliance	9,280	Elected
John Cortes	GSLP	GSLP–Liberal Alliance	9,256	Elected
Roy Clinton	GSD	-	9,250	Elected
Craig Sacarello	GSD	-	9,068	Elected
Christian Santos	GSLP	GSLP–Liberal Alliance	8,947	Elected
Patricia Orfila	GSLP	GSLP–Liberal Alliance	8,729	Elected
Edwin Reyes	GSD	-	8,680	Elected
Joelle Ladislaus	GSD	-	8,601	Elected
Leslie Bruzon	LPG	GSLP–Liberal Alliance	8,457	Elected
Joseph Bossano	GSLP	GSLP–Liberal Alliance	8,346	Elected
Giovanni Origo	GSD	-	8,314	Elected
Atrish Sanchez	GSD	-	8,258	Elected
Daniella Tilbury	GSD	-	8,074	
Vijay Daryanani	LPG	GSLP–Liberal Alliance	7,932	Unseated
Youseff El Hana	GSD	-	7,083	
Robert Vasquez	Independent	-	3,262	
Source: Parliament, Chronicle
