= 2015 Gibraltar general election =

- 26 November 2015

All 17 seats in the Gibraltar Parliament 9 seats needed for a majority
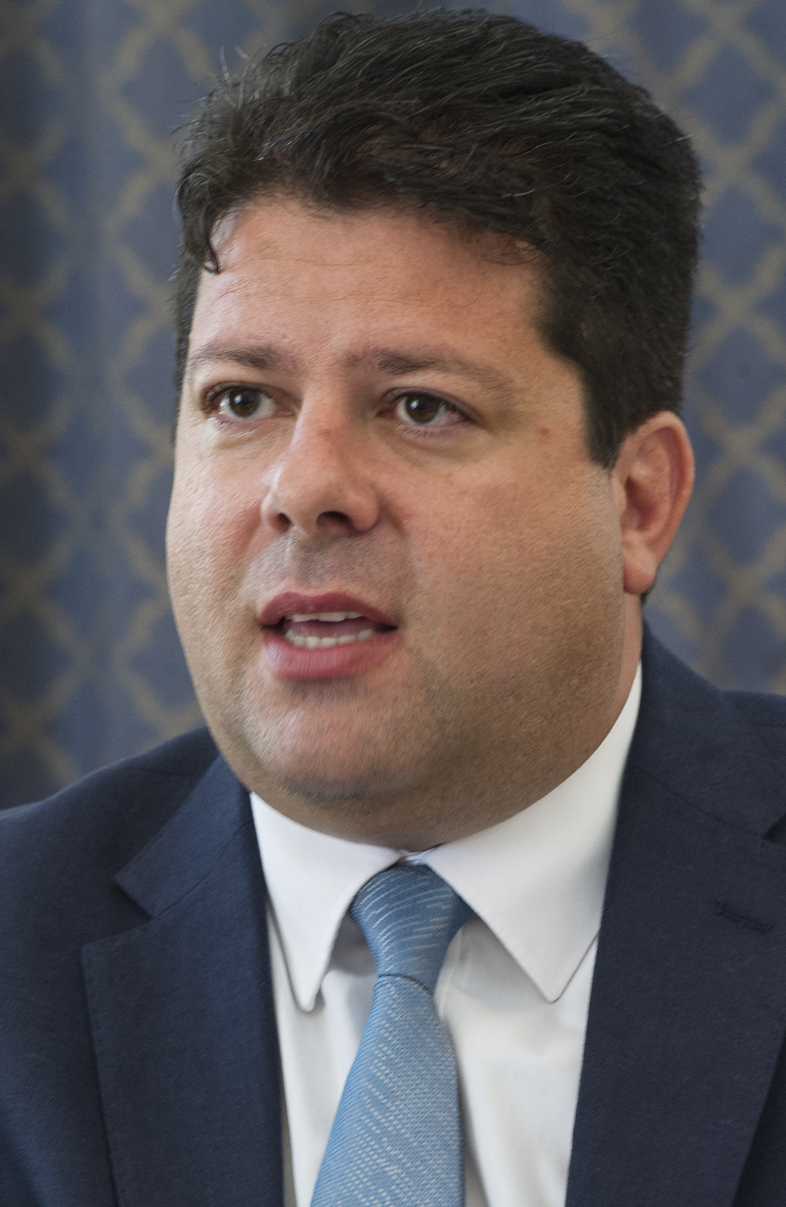

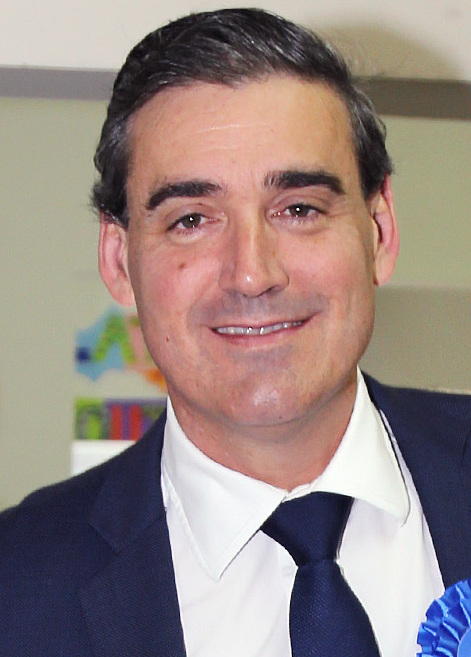
	First party	Second party
Leader	Fabian Picardo	Daniel Feetham
Party	Socialist Labour	Social Democrats
Alliance	GSLP–Liberal
Last election	48.88%, 10 seats	46.76%, 7 seats
Seats won	10	7
Seat change	Steady	Steady
Popular vote	100,950	46,545
Percentage	68.44%	31.56%
Swing	▲19.56pp	▼15.20pp
Chief Minister before election
Fabian Picardo
Socialist Labour
Elected Chief Minister
Fabian Picardo
Socialist Labour

General elections were held in Gibraltar on 26 November 2015 to elect all 17 members to the third Gibraltar Parliament. Chief Minister Fabian Picardo announced the date of the election on Monday 19 October 2015 during a speech on the Gibraltar Broadcasting Corporation.

== Background ==
Under section 38(2) of the Gibraltar Constitution Order 2006, the parliament must be dissolved by the Governor four years after its first meeting following the last election (unless the Chief Minister advises the Governor to dissolve parliament sooner). Under section 37 of the Constitution, writs for a general election must be issued within thirty days of the dissolution and the general election must then be held no later than three months after the issuing of a writ. In October 2015, Chief Minister Fabian Picardo announced that the election would take place on 26 November. Following the British tradition, elections in Gibraltar conventionally take place on a Thursday.

== Campaign ==
The UK-based UK Independence Party announced in 2014 that it was planning on fielding candidates for the first time in Gibraltar's next general election. However, ultimately they did not field any candidates. There were also no independents.

=== Party slogans ===
Party or alliance	Slogan
GSLP/Libs Alliance	"The Strongest Foundations For Your Future"
GSD	"Forward Together"

=== Incumbent MPs (from 2011) ===
Candidate	Party	Seeking re-election?	Parliamentary role(s)
Fabian Picardo (since 2003)	GSLP–Liberal Alliance (GSLP)	Yes	Chief Minister
John Cortes (since 2011)	GSLP–Liberal Alliance (GSLP)	Yes	Minister for Health and Environment (2011–2014); Minister for Health, the Environment, Energy and Climate Change (2014–2015)
Joseph Garcia (since 1999) (Note: Elected in 1999 by-election after the death of elected GSLP MP and Shadow Minister & former Mayor of Gibraltar, Robert Mor.)	GSLP–Liberal Alliance (LPG)	Yes	Deputy Chief Minister
Gilbert Licudi (since 2007)	GSLP–Liberal Alliance (GSLP)	Yes	Minister for Education, Financial Services, Gaming, Telecommunications and Justice (2011–2013); Minister for Education, Telecommunications and Justice (2013–2014); Minister for Education and Justice & International Exchange of Information (2014–2015)
Joseph Bossano (since 1972)	GSLP–Liberal Alliance (GSLP) (since 1980)	Yes	Minister for Enterprise, Training and Employment (2011–2013); Minister for Enterprise, Training, Employment and Health & Safety (2013–2014); Minister for Economic Development, Telecommunications & the GSB (2014–2015)
Peter Caruana (since 1991) (Note: Elected in 1991 by-election after the resignation of former AACR MP and Founder and first GSD Leader, Peter Montegriffo. He had beaten his opponent, AACR's Douglas Henrich (2496 vs 1542 votes).)	GSD	No	Leader of the Opposition (2011–2013); Opposition Backbencher (2013-2015)
Neil Costa (since 2011)	GSLP–Liberal Alliance (LPG)	Yes	Minister for Tourism, Public Transport and the Port (2011–2012); Minister for Tourism, Commercial Affairs, Public Transport and the Port (2012–2014); Minister for Business, Employment, Skills & Training (2014–2015)
Daniel Feetham (since 2007)	GSD	Yes	Shadow Minister (2011–2013); Leader of the Opposition and Shadow Minister for Gaming and GSB (since 2013)
Steven Linares (since 2000)	GSLP–Liberal Alliance (LPG)	Yes	Minister for Sports, Culture, Heritage and Youth
Samantha Sacramento (since 2011)	GSLP–Liberal Alliance (GSLP)	Yes	Minister for Equality and Social Services (2011–2013); Minister for Equality, Social Services and the Elderly (2013–2014); Minister for Tourism, Housing, Equality and Social Services (2014–2015)
Isobel Ellul-Hammond (since 2011)	GSD	No	Shadow Minister for Health and Civil Contingencies (2011–2013); Shadow Minister for Health, Civil Contingencies, Care Services, the Elderly, Family, Equality and Civil Rights (2013–2015)
Paul Balban (since 2011)	GSLP–Liberal Alliance (GSLP)	Yes	Minister for Traffic, Health & Safety and Technical Services (2011–2013); Minister for Traffic, Housing and Technical Services (2013–2014); Minister for Transport, Traffic and Technical Services (2014–2015)
Damon Bossino (since 2011)	GSD	No	Shadow Minister for Tourism, Aviation and Shipping (2011–2013); Shadow Minister for Tourism, Aviation, Shipping, Enterprise, Training, Employment and Health & Safety (2013–2015)
Edwin Reyes (since 2007)	GSD	Yes	Shadow Minister for Sports, Culture, Heritage, Youth and Education (2011–2015)
Jaime Netto (since 1996)	GSD	No	Shadow Minister (2011–2013); Shadow Minister for Environment (2013–2015)
Selwyn Figueras (since 2011)	GSD	No	Shadow Minister (2011–2013); Shadow Minister for Justice, Financial Services, Planning, Traffic and Transport (2013–2015)
Albert Isola (since 2013) (Note: Elected in 2013 by-election after the death of elected MP and Minister for Housing and the Elderly, Charles Bruzon.)	GSLP–Liberal Alliance (GSLP)	Yes	Minister for Financial Services and Gaming

== Opinion polls ==
A GBC public opinion poll of 17 November predicted 67% for GSLP/Libs and 33% for GSD.

== Results ==
The results saw the first occasion on which a party received over 100,000 votes. Both the GSLP and LPG received more votes in the elections than in any other previous general elections, with the LPG receiving the highest percentage of votes in its history. Contrastingly, the GSD saw the largest drop in its vote share in its history. Voter turnout (70.77%) was the lowest since 1980.

Party or alliance		Votes	%	Seats	+/–
Alliance	Gibraltar Socialist Labour Party	70,551	47.83	7	0
Alliance	Liberal Party of Gibraltar	30,399	20.61	3	0
Alliance	Total	100,950	68.44	10	0
Gibraltar Social Democrats		46,545	31.56	7	0
Total		147,495	100.00	17	0
Valid votes		15,578	94.56		
Invalid/blank votes		897	5.44		
Total votes		16,475	100.00		
Registered voters/turnout		23,278	70.77		
Source: Parliament of Gibraltar

=== By candidate ===
Candidate	Party	Alliance	Votes	Notes
Fabian Picardo	GSLP	GSLP–Liberal Alliance	10,852	Elected
Joseph Garcia	LPG	GSLP–Liberal Alliance	10,661	Elected
John Cortes	GSLP	GSLP–Liberal Alliance	10,529	Elected
Gilbert Licudi	GSLP	GSLP–Liberal Alliance	10,379	Elected
Albert Isola	GSLP	GSLP–Liberal Alliance	10,313	Elected
Neil Costa	LPG	GSLP–Liberal Alliance	10,048	Elected
Samantha Sacramento	GSLP	GSLP–Liberal Alliance	9,822	Elected
Steven Linares	LPG	GSLP–Liberal Alliance	9,690	Elected
Paul Balban	GSLP	GSLP–Liberal Alliance	9,511	Elected
Joseph Bossano	GSLP	GSLP–Liberal Alliance	9,145	Elected
Daniel Feetham	GSD	-	5,054	Elected
Marlene Hassan Nahon	GSD	-	4,892	Elected
Elliott Phillips	GSD	-	4,784	Elected
Edwin Reyes	GSD	-	4,766	Elected
Roy Clinton	GSD	-	4,733	Elected
Trevor Hammond	GSD	-	4,578	Elected
Lawrence Llamas	GSD	-	4,565	Elected
Robert Vasquez	GSD	-	4,535	
Christopher White	GSD	-	4,324	
Kim Karnani-Santos	GSD	-	4,314	
Source: Parliament of Gibraltar
