= Endorsements in the 2019 European Parliament election in the United Kingdom =

Various newspapers, organisations and individuals endorsed parties or individual candidates for the 2019 European Parliament election in the United Kingdom.

== Newspapers ==
Newspaper	Endorsement
Daily Mail	Conservative Party, Brexit Party in strategic electorates
Evening Standard	Liberal Democrats
The Guardian; The Observer	Pro-EU candidates
The News Letter (Belfast)	Unionist candidates
The Sun	Brexit Party
Sunday Mail (Scotland)	Scottish Green Party
Sunday Mirror	Labour Party

== Online publications ==
- The ConservativeHome blog and its editor Paul Goodman implied endorsing, or appeared to suggest, abstaining from the elections.
- The online magazine Spiked endorsed the Brexit Party.
- The online newspaper Human Events endorsed the Brexit Party.
- The online newspaper The Independent endorsed candidates that can "best influence EU lawmaking".

== Organisations ==
- The Alliance Party of Northern Ireland encouraged voters in Northern Ireland to give their second preferences to other candidates opposed to Brexit.
- The Communication Workers Union (CWU) endorsed the Labour Party.
- The leadership of Mebyon Kernow endorsed the Green Party.
- The Communist Party of Britain through its official organ the Morning Star called for a boycott of the European elections.
- The Communist Party of Great Britain (Marxist–Leninist) endorsed the Brexit Party.
- For Britain, a far-right party, supported independent candidate Tommy Robinson.
- The Gibraltar Social Democrats encouraged voters in Gibraltar to vote for parties opposed to Brexit or supporting a second referendum.
- The Loyalist Communities Council, an umbrella group for illegal loyalist paramilitary groups, called on voters to support unionist parties.
- The Muslim Public Affairs Committee UK (MPAC UK) encouraged voting for Labour, the Greens, the SNP or Plaid Cymru.
- The New Communist Party of Britain through its official organ The New Worker encouraged a boycott of the election.
- Remain United, a website set up by activist Gina Miller to encourage tactical voting in the EU elections to maximise the number of MEPs who support remaining in the EU, made an initial recommendation in early May, based on a ComRes poll, that people should vote for the Liberal Democrats in England, the SNP in Scotland and Plaid Cymru in Wales.
- Sinn Féin encouraged voters in Northern Ireland to give their second preferences to other candidates opposed to Brexit.
- The Socialist Workers Party through its official organ The Socialist Worker endorsed the Labour Party.
- Together Gibraltar encouraged voters in Gibraltar to vote for parties opposed to Brexit and supporting a second referendum, specifically naming Change UK, the Liberal Democrats and the Green Party.

== Individuals ==
Brexit Party

- Jamie Bryson, unionist activist in Northern Ireland.
- Derek Chisora, professional boxer.
- George Galloway, former Labour and Respect Party MP.
- Jeremy Hosking, businessperson and former donor to the Conservatives.
- Lee Hurst, comedian.
- Václav Klaus, former president and inaugural Prime Minister of the Czech Republic.
- Tim Martin, businessman.
- Tim Montgomerie, political activist, blogger, and columnist.
- Douglas Murray, The Spectator journalist.
- Patrick O'Flynn, Social Democratic Party MEP (elected as a UKIP MEP in 2014).
- Allison Pearson, author and newspaper columnist.
- Peter Shilton, former England goalkeeper
- Steven Woolfe, independent MEP (elected as a UKIP MEP in 2014).

Change UK

- Martin Bell, former independent MP, UNICEF ambassador and reporter.
- Dan Hodges, columnist.
- Jane Kennedy, former Labour minister and MP and sitting independent Merseyside Police and Crime Commissioner.

Conservative Party

- Jan Zahradil, President and Spitzenkandidat ('lead candidate' for election as President of the European Commission) of the Alliance of Conservatives and Reformists in Europe.

Green Party

- Steve Backshall, naturalist, writer and television presenter.
- Hugh Fearnley-Whittingstall, celebrity chef, television personality, journalist and food writer.
- Matt Haig, novelist and journalist.
- Duncan Jones, film director, producer and screenwriter.
- Robin Lustig, journalist and radio broadcaster.
- Augustus Prew, actor.
- Peter Reid, football manager.
- Jolyon Rubinstein, actor, writer, producer and director.
- Jack Thorne, screenwriter and playwright.
- Dick Cole, member of Cornwall Council and the leader of Mebyon Kernow.

Labour Party

- Thom Brooks, political philosopher and legal scholar.
- Rob Delaney, American comedian, actor and writer.
- Dawn Foster, journalist, broadcaster and author.
- Nikhil Goyal, American journalist, activist and author.
- Adam Howden, actor.
- Owen Jones, political commentator and activist.
- Mark McGowan, performance artist and political activist.
- Zoe Williams, journalist.

Liberal Democrats

- Rafael Behr, political commentator.
- Mitch Benn, comedian, author and musician.
- Georgie Bingham, radio and television presenter
- Katy Brand, actor, comedian and writer.
- Simon Callow, actor, musician, writer, and theatre director.
- Michael Cashman, Labour peer, former actor.
- Andrew Cooper, Conservative peer, pollster and David Cameron's former Director of Strategy, who subsequently had the Conservative whip suspended due to his endorsement.
- Greg Dyke, media executive, football administrator, journalist and broadcaster.
- Jenny Eclair, comedian, novelist and actor.
- Simon Fraser, former Permanent Secretary.
- Joseph Garcia, Deputy Chief Minister of Gibraltar and leader of the Liberal Party of Gibraltar.
- Bamber Gascoigne, television presenter and author.
- Julie Girling, independent MEP (elected as a Conservative MEP in 2014).
- David Allen Green, lawyer and writer.
- Michael Heseltine, Conservative peer and former Deputy Prime Minister, who subsequently had the Conservative whip suspended due to his endorsement. He later had the Whip restored over five years later in July 2024.
- James Hurst, footballer.
- Emma Kennedy, actress, writer and television presenter.
- Andrew MacKinlay, former Labour MP for Thurrock.
- Peter Oborne, journalist
- James O'Brien, broadcaster and journalist.
- Gus O'Donnell, former Cabinet Secretary.
- Matthew Parris, former Conservative MP for West Derbyshire, writer and broadcaster.
- Susan Penhaligon, actress and writer.
- Guy Verhofstadt, former Prime Minister of Belgium, leader of the ALDE group and currently the European Parliament's representative in the Brexit negotiations.

Individual candidates

- Donald Tusk, President of the European Council and former Prime Minister of Poland, endorsed Jacek Rostowski, a Change UK candidate for London.
- Julia Hartley-Brewer, broadcaster and newspaper columnist, endorsed Martin Daubney, a Brexit party candidate for the West Midlands.

Mixed endorsements

- David Blanchflower, economist and academic, endorsed voting for parties in favour of remaining in the European Union.
- Jonathan Freedland, journalist and author, endorsed the Liberal Democrats or Greens.
- Gaby Hinsliff, journalist, endorsed the Liberal Democrats, Greens or Change UK in England, and SNP or Plaid Cymru in Scotland and Wales.
- Katie Hopkins, newspaper columnist and chat show host, endorsed the Brexit Party, unless voters had a UKIP MEP that they loved.
- David McNarry, former leader of UKIP in Northern Ireland, endorsed voting for unionist parties.
- Fabian Picardo, Chief Minister of Gibraltar and leader of the Gibraltar Socialist Labour Party, encouraged voting for candidates opposed to Brexit.
- Alan Sugar (independent member of the House of Lords, formerly Labour) urged voters to not vote for Labour.
