= 2023 in Gibraltar =

Events in the year 2023 in Gibraltar.

== Incumbents ==
- Monarch: Charles III
- Chief Minister: Fabian Picardo

== Events ==
- 12 October: 2023 Gibraltar general election: The GSLP–Liberal Alliance secured a fourth term in office.

== Holidays ==
- 1 January – New Year's Day
- 28 March – Maundy Thursday
- 7 April – Good Friday
- 10 April – Easter Monday
- 28 April – Workers Memorial Day
- 1 May – May Day
- 12 June – King's Official Birthday
- 10 September – National Day
- 24 December – Christmas Eve
- 25 December – Christmas Day
- 26 December – Boxing Day
- 31 December – New Year's Eve

== Sports ==
- 2022–23 Rock Cup
