= 2007 Gibraltar general election =

- 11 October 2007

All 17 seats in the Gibraltar Parliament 9 seats needed for a majority
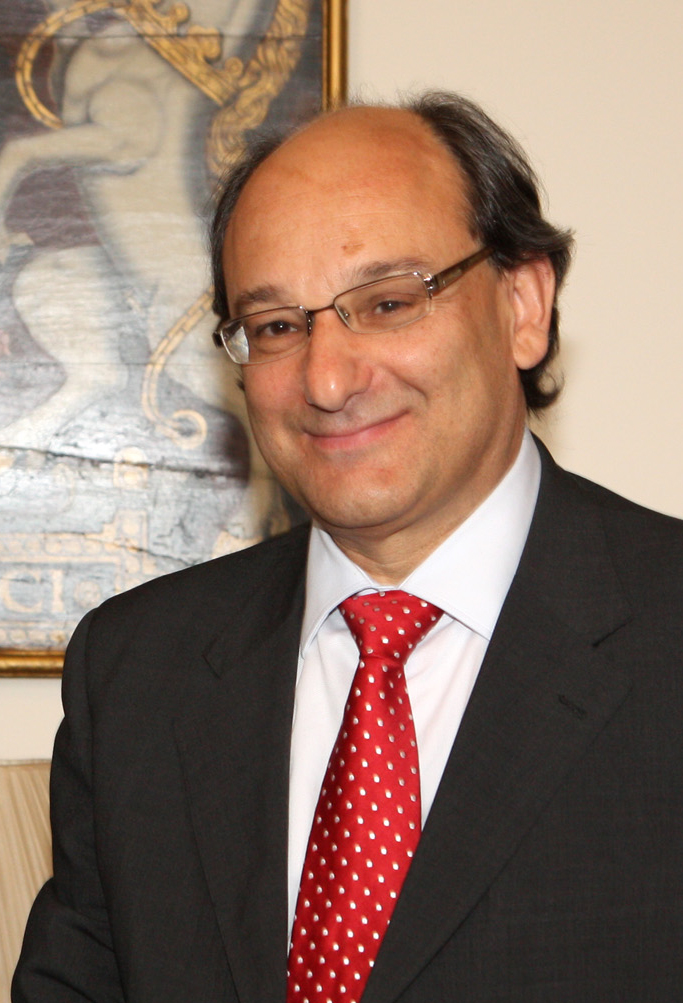

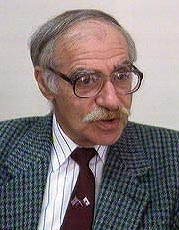
	First party	Second party
Leader	Peter Caruana	Joe Bossano
Party	Social Democrats	Socialist Labour
Alliance		GSLP–Liberal
Last election	51.45%, 8 seats	39.69%, 7 seats
Seats won	10	7
Seat change	▲2	Steady
Popular vote	76,334	70,397
Percentage	49.33%	45.49%
Swing	▼2.12pp	▲5.80pp
Chief Minister before election
Peter Caruana
Gibraltar Social Democrats
Elected Chief Minister
Peter Caruana
Social Democrats

General elections were held in Gibraltar on 11 October 2007. The incumbent Chief Minister Peter Caruana narrowly won a fourth term, but opposition leader Joe Bossano had a very strong showing. Joe Bossano noted that this would be his last term as an MP, and joked that he would not join the government, despite receiving a higher personal vote than some members of the Gibraltar Social Democrats (GSD).

The GSD had ten candidates (all of whom were elected), Bossano's party the Gibraltar Socialist Labour Party (GSLP) had seven candidates (four of whom were elected) and the Liberal Party of Gibraltar (LPG) led by Dr. Joseph Garcia had three candidates (all of whom were elected). The Progressive Democratic Party (PDP) fielded six candidates, five of whom obtained the fewest votes in the election after a lacklustre campaign. Two independents were unable to break through Gibraltar's party block vote system but did relatively well. They were the right wing lawyer Charles Gomez of New Gibraltar Democracy and Richard Martinez of the Parental Support Group.

An exit poll organised by the Gibraltar Broadcasting Corporation (GBC) gave victory to the GSLP/Liberal coalition, but as counting progressed this proved incorrect.

== Party slogans and election logos ==
Party or alliance	Slogan
GSD	"You know you can trust the GSD"
GSLP/Libs Alliance	"Looking after all our PEOPLE!"
Progressive Democratic Party	"A Fresh Start"
Charles Gomez (NGD)	
Richard Martinez (Parents Support Group)	

=== Incumbent MPs (from 2003) ===
MP	Party	Seeking re-election?	Parliamentary role(s)
Peter Caruana (since 1991) (Note: Elected in 1991 by-election after the resignation of former AACR MP and Founder and first GSD Leader, Peter Montegriffo. He had beaten his opponent, AACR's Douglas Henrich (2496 vs 1542 votes).)	GSD	Yes	Chief Minister (since 1996)
Joseph Holliday (since 1996)	GSD	Yes	Minister for Trade, Industry, and Communications (2003–2004); Minister for Trade, Industry, Employment and Communications (2004–2007)
Bernard Linares (since 1996)	GSD	No	Minister for Education, Employment and Training (2003–2004); Minister for Education, Training, Civic and Consumer Affairs (2004–2007)
Ernest Britto (since 1996)	GSD	Yes	Minister for Health (2003–2007)
Jaime Netto (since 1996)	GSD	Yes	Minister for Housing (2003–2004); Minister for the Environment (2004–2007)
Fabian Vinet (since 2003)	GSD	Yes	Minister for the Environment, Roads and Utilities (2003–2004); Minister for Heritage, Culture, Youth and Sport (2004–2007)
Clive Beltran (since 2003)	GSD	Yes	Minister for Heritage, Culture, Youth and Sport (2003–2004); Minister for Housing (2004–2007)
Yvette Del Agua (since 2000)	GSD	Yes	Minister for Social and Civic Affairs (2003–2004); Minister for Social Affairs (2004–2007)
Joe Bossano (since 1972)	GSLP–Liberal Alliance (GSLP) (since 1980)	Yes	Leader of the Opposition (since 1996) Founder and Leader of GSLP (since 1980) Leader of Alliance (since 2000)
Joseph Garcia (since 1999) (Note: Elected in 1999 by-election after the death of elected GSLP MP and Shadow Minister & former Mayor of Gibraltar, Robert Mor)	GSLP–Liberal Alliance (LPG)	Yes	Shadow Minister for Trade, Industry, Tourism and Heritage Leader of LPG (since 1991)
Fabian Picardo (since 2003)	GSLP–Liberal Alliance (GSLP)	Yes	Shadow Minister for Justice and Public Service Reform
Charles Bruzon (since 2003)	GSLP–Liberal Alliance (GSLP)	Yes	Shadow Minister for Housing
Steven Linares (since 2000)	GSLP–Liberal Alliance (LPG)	Yes	Shadow Minister for Education and Youth
Maria Montegriffo (since 1984)	GSLP–Liberal Alliance (GSLP)	No	Shadow Minister for Social Services and Health
Lucio Randall (since 2003)	GSLP–Liberal Alliance (GSLP)	Yes	Shadow Minister for Environment and Utilities

== Results ==
Party or alliance		Votes	%	Seats	+/–
Gibraltar Social Democrats		76,334	49.33	10	+2
Alliance	Gibraltar Socialist Labour Party	49,277	31.84	4	–1
Alliance	Liberal Party of Gibraltar	21,120	13.65	3	+1
Alliance	Total	70,397	45.49	7	0
Progressive Democratic Party		5,799	3.75	0	New
New Gibraltar Democracy		1,210	0.78	0	New
Independents		1,003	0.65	0	New
Total		154,743	100.00	17	0
Total votes		16,004	–		
Registered voters/turnout		19,660	81.40		
Source: Parliament, Parliament

=== By candidate ===
Candidate	Party	Alliance	Votes	Notes
Peter Caruana	GSD	-	8333	Elected
Fabian Vinet	GSD	-	7810	Elected
Jaime Netto	GSD	-	7755	Elected
Ernest Britto	GSD	-	7669	Elected
Joseph Holliday	GSD	-	7666	Elected
Clive Beltran	GSD	-	7642	Elected
Joseph Bossano	GSLP	GSLP-Liberal Alliance	7561	Elected
Yvette Del Agua	GSD	-	7422	Elected
Daniel Feetham	GSD	-	7419	Elected
Fabian Picardo	GSLP	GSLP-Liberal Alliance	7376	Elected
Luis Montiel	GSD	-	7347	Elected
Edwin Reyes	GSD	-	7271	Elected
Joseph Garcia	LPG	GSLP-Liberal Alliance	7225	Elected
Gilbert Licudi	GSLP	GSLP-Liberal Alliance	7149	Elected
Charles Bruzon	GSLP	GSLP-Liberal Alliance	7049	Elected
Neil Costa	LPG	GSLP-Liberal Alliance	6999	Elected
Steven Linares	LPG	GSLP-Liberal Alliance	6896	Elected
Paul Balban	GSLP	GSLP-Liberal Alliance	6782	
Maribel Chellaram Hathiramani	GSLP	GSLP-Liberal Alliance	6688	
Lucio Randall	GSLP	GSLP-Liberal Alliance	6672	Unseated
Keith Azopardi	PDP	-	2163	
Charles Gomez	NGD (Independent Candidate)	-	1210	
Richard Martinez	Independent (Parents Support Group)	-	1003	
Nick Cruz	PDP	-	908	
Gavin Gafan	PDP	-	711	
Rosemarie Peach	PDP	-	684	
Moira Walsh	PDP	-	674	
Giselle Sene	PDP	-	659	
