= Paul Balban =

Gibraltarian former taxi driver, dietician & former politician

The Hon. Paul John Balban MP

Government Minister
- In office 2011–2023

Personal details
- Born: Gibraltar
- Party: Gibraltar Socialist Labour Party (GSLP)
- Spouse: Gina
- Children: 3
- Education: Oxford Brookes University; King's College London
- Occupation: Politician; Dietitian; Taxi driver
- Portfolio: Minister for Transport
- Website: Paul Balban at the Government of Gibraltar website

Paul John Balban is a former Gibraltarian politician, state registered dietitian and former taxi driver. He was first elected to the Gibraltar Parliament at the 2011 general elections and was a Gibraltar government minister until 12 October 2023, member of the Gibraltar Socialist Labour Party (GSLP). On 15 September 2023, he announced that he and fellow party MPs and ministers, Albert Isola and Samantha Sacramento, would not stand for re-election.

== Biography ==
Paul Balban is married to wife Gina and has three daughters. For many years, Balban has worked as a taxi driver in Gibraltar, and was treasurer of the Gibraltar Taxi Association Committee. He studied nutrition and food science at Oxford Brookes University and also has a postgraduate degree in dietetics from King's College London. He later became a state registered dietitian, practicing at Central Clinic, in Horse Barrack Lane, Gibraltar.

=== Political career ===
Balban was nominated for the GSLP executive in February 2007, and was one of the ten GSLP-Liberal alliance candidates to contest the general elections that year, but failed to be elected as one of the seventeen Members of Parliament. He was elected into government following the general elections of 2011 with 8,281 votes. The newly elected chief minister, Fabian Picardo, appointed Balban as minister for traffic, health and safety and technical services.
