= Progressive Democratic Party (Gibraltar) =

Former Gibraltarian political party

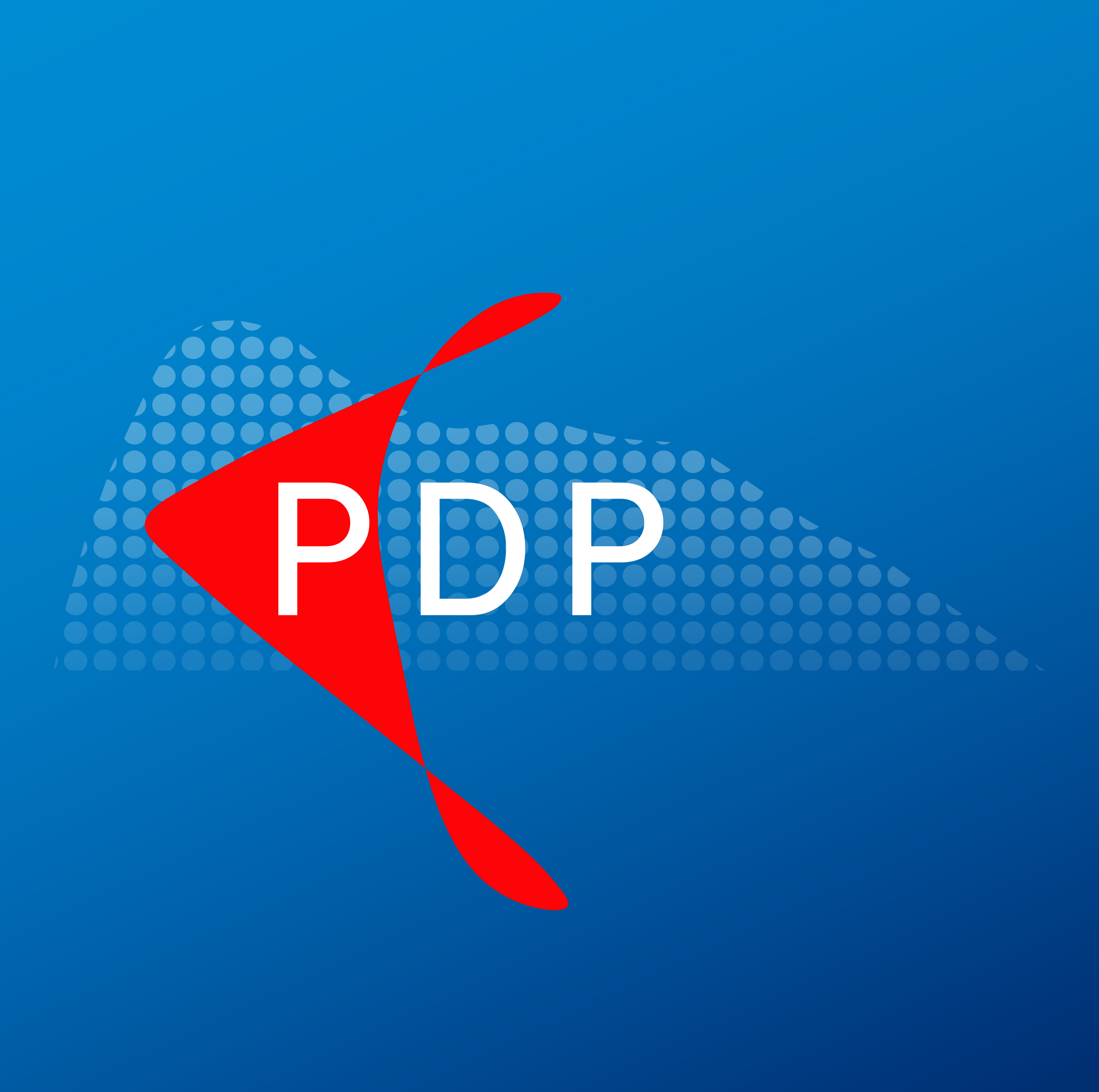
- Leader: Nick Cruz
- Founder: Keith Azopardi & Nick Cruz
- Founded: 7 June 2006; 19 years ago
- Dissolved: 31 August 2013; 11 years ago
- Split from: Gibraltar Social Democrats
- Headquarters: Irish Town, Gibraltar
- Ideology: Liberal conservatism Economic liberalism
- Political position: Centre-right
- Colours: Red, White, Blue

The Progressive Democratic Party (PDP) was a liberal conservative political party from Gibraltar.

The party was the third political party and the only party to sit on the centre-right in Gibraltar. The PDP was the only party campaigning for "a Gibraltar freely associated to the United Kingdom" and envisaged "a journey through the recognition of our right to independence". The party was also the only political party in Gibraltar that openly committed to implementing a means testing system in government housing.

The PDP described itself as "the only real choice for an alternative, authentic, centrist government which has vision, is progressive and is in tune with the aspirations of Gibraltarians for stable and moderate liberal politics."

== History ==
Founders
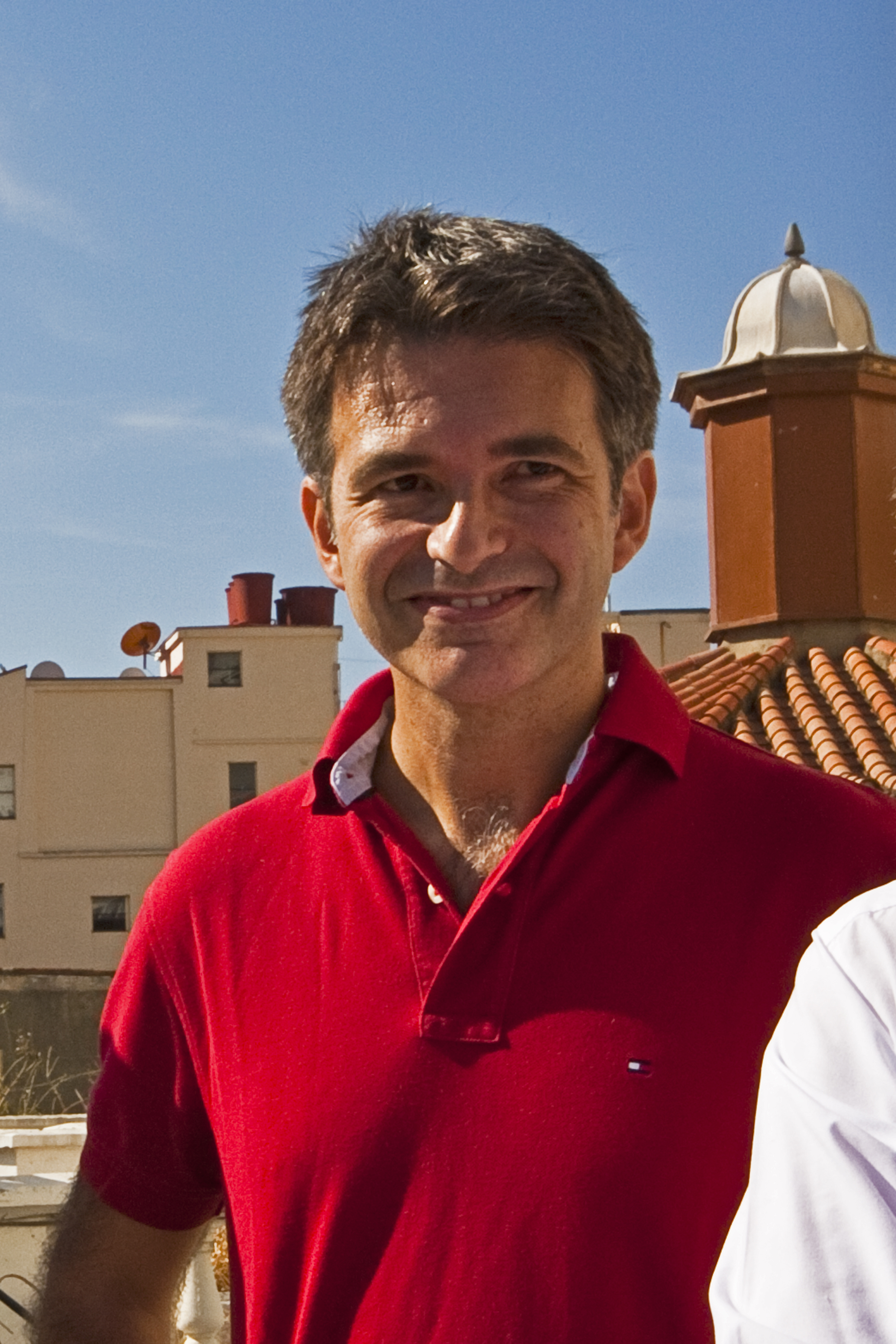
Keith Azopardi, co-founder of the PDP

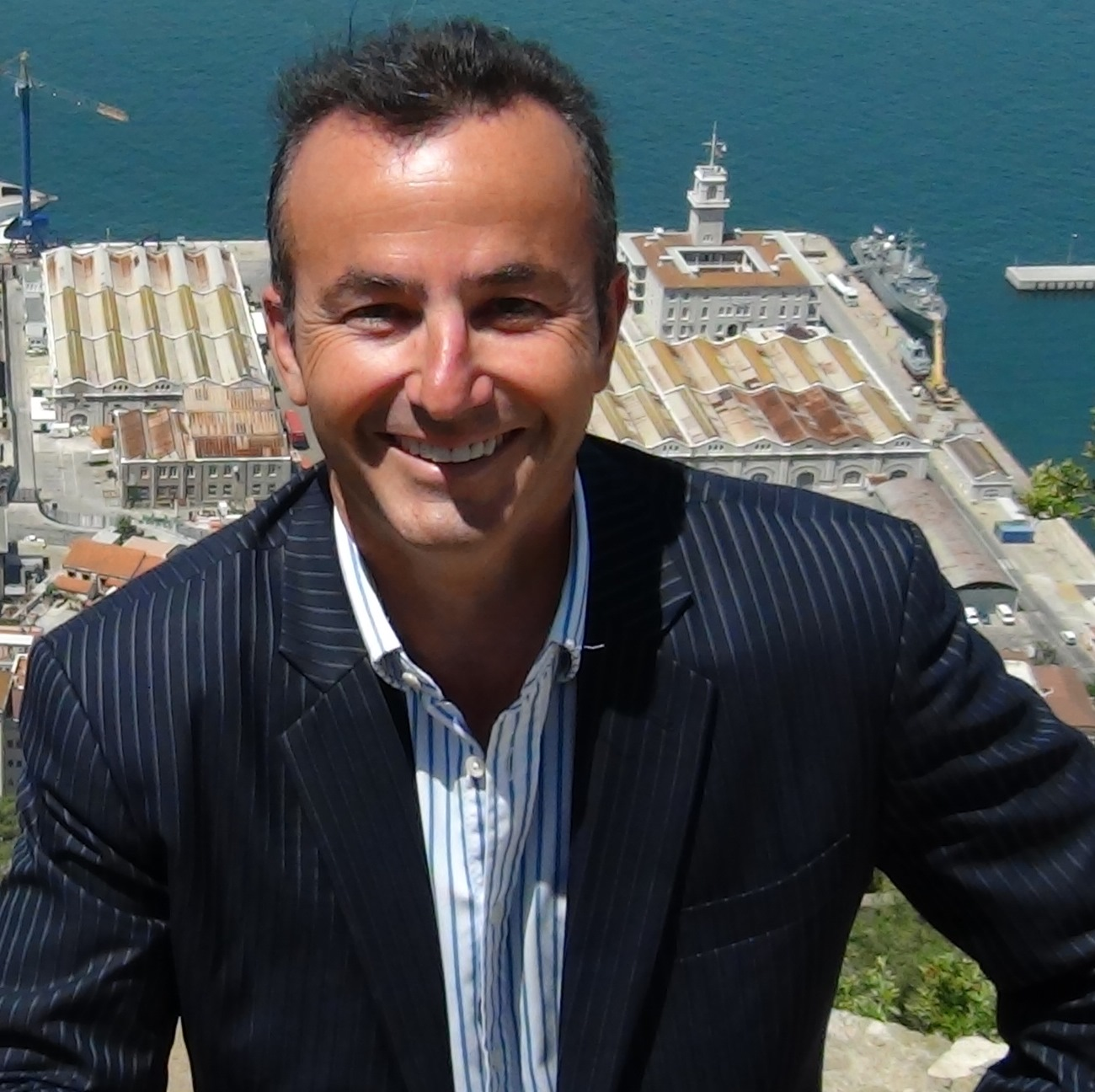
Nick Cruz, co-founder of the PDP

The party was co-founded by Gibraltarian lawyers Keith Azopardi and Nick Cruz among other members in June 2006. The PDP has been described as a splinter group of the Gibraltar Social Democrats. This is because Azopardi and Cruz were both leading figures in the GSD who resigned due to disillusionment with the GSD party following a merger with the Gibraltar Labour Party.

Marie-Lou Guerrero and Leo Olivero left the party in November 2006 in opposition to the party's "yes" stance on the referendum on Gibraltar's new constitution.

The Party decided to support the constitution despite reservations "because it represented a massive leap forward from the 1969 constitution and because it put us in a much better position to then take the next steps."

On 6 June 2012, Keith Azopardi stepped down as leader of the PDP. At an AGM on 3 December 2012, Azopardi was elected as Party Chairman and Nick Cruz as Party Leader.

On 22 July, the executive committee met and decided, by overwhelming majority, to call it a day. A press release issued on 30 July 2013 confirmed that the party would be "wound up" with effect as from 31 August 2013. An EGM (Extraordinary General Meeting) will be held to pass the resolution and party funds will be donated to charity.

=== Policy ===
The Progressive Democratic Party declared that it was founded on several basic pillars;

- A fundamental belief and respect for democracy, social justice and equality;
- Adherence to the inalienable and unqualified right to self-determination of the people of Gibraltar;
- The promotion of liberty, social and economic responsibility;
- The enhancement of individual and collective freedoms;
- A belief in fair, open and continually accountable government;
- The desire to foster sustainable development, public participation and the enhancement of the quality of life of the people of Gibraltar

== Election results ==
=== Parliament of Gibraltar ===
Election year	# of overall votes	% of overall vote	# of overall seats won	±
2007	5,799	3.75	0 / 17	New
2011	7,622	4.36	0 / 17	Steady
2013 (by-election)*	688	7.00	0 / 1 0 / 17	Steady
*The 2013 by-election in Gibraltar was to fill in a seat vacated by then-GSLP MP, Charles Arthur Bruzon, who died that year. Hence, the composition bar on this row would only signify whether or not a member of a particular political party has won the seat. If that particular member had won the seat, then the entire bar would be colored in.

=== European Parliament ===
Gibraltar was part of the South West England constituency in the European parliament and its major parties formed joint ticket alliances with the major UK parties. The PDP did not form an alliance for the 2009 elections and did not stand any candidates.
