= Steven Linares =

Gibraltarian former teacher, barrister and former politician

The Honourable Steven Ernest Linares MP
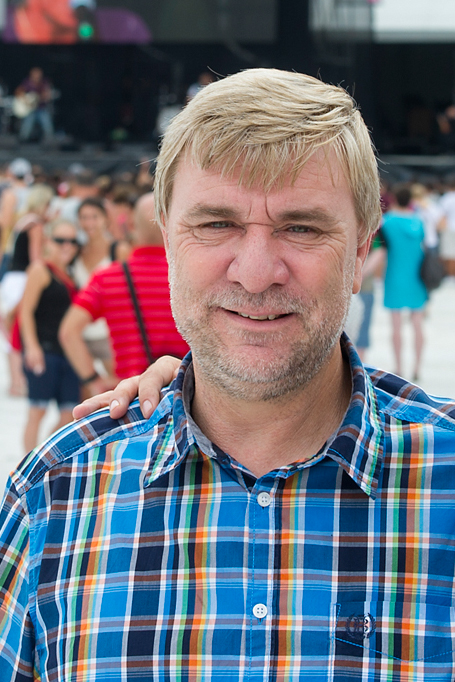
- Steven Linares at the 2013 Gibraltar Music Festival

Minister for Housing, Youth, Sport & Industrial Relations
- In office 2011–2023

Shadow Minister for Education, Culture, Sport, Youth, Civic Rights & Media and Broadcasting
- In office 2000–2011

Personal details
- Born: Gibraltar
- Party: GSLP (1989-1992); LPG (since 1992)
- Other political affiliations: GSLP-Liberal Alliance (since 2000)
- Children: 3
- Education: Bayside Comprehensive School; Leeds Trinity University College; University of Wolverhampton; University of the West of England; Middle Temple Inns of Court
- Occupation: Teacher (1988-2000); Barrister (since 2010); Politician (2000-2023)
- Portfolio: Minister for Housing, Employment, Youth & Sport
- Website: Steven Linares at the Government of Gibraltar website

The Hon. Steven Ernest Linares is a Gibraltarian teacher, trade unionist, barrister and former politician affiliated to the Liberal Party of Gibraltar (LPG). He was an MP at the Gibraltar Parliament and as of December 2011 formed part of the Government of Gibraltar as Minister for Sport, Culture, Heritage, Youth, Utilities, Refuse Collection, Fire Service, Civil Contingencies and Postal Services. Since June 2021, Linares was the Minister for Housing, Employment, Youth and Sport. On 19 September 2023, it was announced that he would not stand for re-election, ending his 23 year career as MP and 12 years as Minister. He has been replaced as the third Gibraltar Liberal Party (and one of 10 GSLP/Libs coalition) candidate by Leslie Bruzon, whom he became his election agent at the fiercely contested but successful elections.

== Biography ==
Linares was one of the first admitted to the Bayside Comprehensive School, along with Peter Montegriffo, Gilbert Licudi and Dominique Searle. He worked in several positions (Barclays Bank, Retco. etc.) before, at the age of 23, enrolling at Leeds Trinity University College where he received his B.Ed. (Hons.) in 1987. In 1988 he taught at St Joseph's Middle School and then for twelve years at the Bishop Fitzgerald Middle School before being elected to Parliament in the 2000 general elections.

Affiliated in 1989 to the Gibraltar Teachers' Association (GTA), Linares was also a member of Gibraltar Socialist Labour Party (GSLP), where he remained until 1992. That year, he joined the Gibraltar National Party (later Liberal Party of Gibraltar) and chose to focus more on union issues. He became vice president of the GTA in 1993 and president in 1995. He was elected to the Gibraltar Trades Council in 1994 and was president of the Gibraltar Representative Organisation from 1993 to 1995, where he worked with Jaime Netto and Joe Holliday.

In 1996, with the defeat of the National Party in the general elections and its transformation into the Liberal Party, Linares was one of the architects of the rapprochement between the LP and the GSLP. In 2000, he became Shadow Minister for Education, Training, Youth and Culture.

In 2009, he became a barrister in the UK, and in 2010 in Gibraltar. Linares attended the University of Wolverhampton (LLB), University of the West of England (Bristol) and is a member of Middle Temple. As a barrister, he worked for the law firm Charles Gomez & Co.

In 2011, with the GSLP/Liberal Alliance's victory in the general elections, Linares was appointed Minister for Sport, Culture, Heritage, Youth, Utilities, Refuse Collection, Fire Service, Civil Contingencies and Postal Services. Since June 2021, Linares is the Minister for Housing, Employment, Youth and Sport.

In 2020 was appointed Chairperson of the Climate Justice Committee of Liberal International.

As Minister for Culture, he was a pioneer in bringing to Gibraltar and organising the Gibraltar Music Festival Gibraltar Music Festival

Married in 1992 and a father of 3, Linares enjoys sports in general, international politics and outdoor pursuits and has hiked Toubkai Atlas Mountains in Morocco the Inca Trials in Peru and the Kilimanjaro Tanzania Uhuru Peaks.
