= GSLP–Liberal Alliance =

- Leader: Fabian Picardo (GSLP); Joseph Garcia (LPG)
- Founded: 2000
- Ideology: Social liberalism Social democracy
- Political position: Centre-left
- Gibraltar Parliament: 9 / 17

The GSLP–Liberal Alliance is a centre-left political alliance active in Gibraltar consisting of the Gibraltar Socialist Labour Party (GSLP) and Liberal Party of Gibraltar (LPG).

== History ==
The first election contested by the Alliance was the 2000 general election in February 2000, in which the GSLP and LPG (the latter the direct successor of the Gibraltar National Party) won 7 seats in the House of Assembly, losing to the centre-right Gibraltar Social Democrats (GSD).

The following 2003 general election on 28 November 2003 was a defeat for the Alliance, again winning 7 seats, as was the 2007 general election on 11 October 2007.

The 2011 general election on 11 December 2011 was the first electoral victory for the Alliance, winning 10 seats in the Gibraltar Parliament, forming the government for the first time, with GSLP leader Fabian Picardo serving as Chief Minister.

In 2013, original Alliance MP and Minister for Housing and the Elderly, Charles Bruzon, died prematurely after only serving two years in government. It resulted in triggering the 2013 by-election. The Alliance submitted Albert Isola (GSLP) as their candidate to retain their seat. He won the by-elections, beating Marlene Hassan-Nahon (GSD), Nick Cruz (PDP) and Bryan Zamitt (Independent).

In the 2015 general election on 26 November 2015, the Alliance returned to the government with 68% of the vote and 10 seats.

In the 2019 general election on 16 September 2019, the Alliance returned to government for the third time, retaining 10 seats but with a decrease vote share of 52.50% (highest out of their 2 electoral opponents). Neil Costa (LPG), one of the original Alliance's Government MPs, announced that he would not be seeking reelection. He was replaced on the elections by his fellow party member, Vijay Daryanani, who became Gibraltar's first MP from the local Hindu community.

In the heavily contested 2023 general election on 12 October 2023, the Alliance narrowly secured itself to be in Government for the fourth time. They won with another decreased vote share of 50.04% (1.89% more than the sole contesting GSD). As a result, they lost one seat to the opposition held by Vijay Daryanani, after only serving one term in government. Five more of the original Alliance Government MPs have announced they would not be seeking reelection. In respective order, the MPs who left government are Gilbert Licudi (GSLP), Paul Balban (GSLP), Albert Isola (GSLP), Samantha Sacramento (GSLP) and Steven Linares (LPG). They were replaced via election by Legal Partners, Gemma Arias-Vasquez and Nigel Feetham (both GSLP); retired teacher and Miss Gibraltar 1974, Patricia Orfila (GSLP); Former Mayor of Gibraltar, Christian Santos (GSLP) and Medical Technician, Leslie Bruzon (LPG).

During the election campaign, Fabian Picardo announced that his fourth term would be his last serving as Chief Minister, with him suggesting that the newcomer, Gemma Arias-Vasquez, should succeed him to take his role, subject to the GSLP Party vote and the next general elections respectively. Another newcomer, Nigel Fetham, had also later expressed his intention to become Picardo's successor.

== Election results ==
=== Parliament of Gibraltar ===
Election	Votes	%	Seats	+/–	Government
2000	46,896	40.57	7 / 15	Steady	Opposition
2003	44,920	39.69	7 / 15	Steady	Opposition
2007	70,397	45.49	7 / 17	Steady	Opposition
2011	85,414	48.87	10 / 17	▲3	Government
2015	100,950	68.44	10 / 17	Steady	Government
2019	83,122	52.50	10 / 17	Steady	Government
2023	89,941	50.04	9 / 17	▼1	Government

=== By-elections ===
Election	Votes	%	Seats	+/–
1999	4,395	51.47	1 / 1	
2013	4,899	49.84	1 / 1	Steady

== See also ==
- Lib–Lab pact
