= Elliott Phillips =

Gibraltarian barrister and former politician

The Honourable Elliott Phillips MP

HM Opposition Shadow Minister for Health and the Environment
- In office 2015–2023

Personal details
- Born: Elliott Phillips Gibraltar
- Party: Gibraltar Social Democrats (GSD)
- Education: University of Plymouth
- Occupation: barrister, politician

The Hon. Elliot Phillips, MP is a Gibraltarian barrister and former Member of the Gibraltar Parliament from 2015-2023, representing the Gibraltar Social Democrats.

Phillips studied law at the University of Plymouth and the Inns of Court School of Law. He was called to the Bar of the Middle Temple Temple, London and qualified as a barrister in England and Gibraltar in 2002. He is a partner in the London and Paris based law firm Signature Litigation which focuses on high value, high stakes cross-border commercial disputes. He is Gibraltar's leading international contentious trust litigator and currently leads the global private client disputes practice. On 13 September, it was announced that he would not stand re-election

He was elected to the Gibraltar Parliament during the 2015 Gibraltar general election and initially served as the Shadow Minister for Justice between November 2015 and November 2017. During 2017 and 2019 he was appointed as Leader of the Opposition. In 2019 he was re-elected to parliament and currently serves as Shadow Minister for Health and the Environment. Phillips is widely viewed as the de facto Deputy Leader of the Opposition despite not being officially appointed. He also acted as the GSD's spokesman on matters related to the COVID-19 outbreak. On 13 September 2023, he announced that he would not stand for re-election on 12 October.
