= Gilbert Licudi =

Gibraltarian Barrister and former politician

The Honourable Gilbert Horace Licudi KC
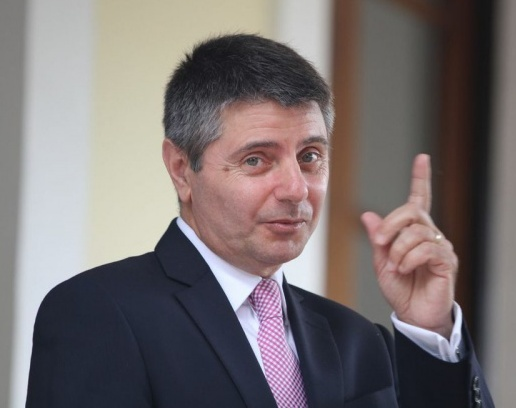

Government Minister
- In office 2011–2020

Shadow Minister
- In office 2007–2011

Personal details
- Born: Gibraltar
- Party: Gibraltar Socialist Labour Party (GSLP)
- Education: Bayside Comprehensive School; Inns of Court School of Law
- Occupation: Barrister; Politician
- Website: Gilbert Licudi QC at the Government of Gibraltar website

The Hon. Gilbert Horace Licudi KC is a Gibraltarian barrister and legal partner at Hassans and former Minister (2011–2020) and former MP (2007–2023) of Gibraltar, member of the Gibraltar Socialist Labour Party (GSLP). He is married and has two children.

== Biography ==
Licudi studied at Bayside Comprehensive School where he was a contemporary of Peter Montegriffo and Dominique Searle. But left the school at age 17 and went to work for Blands and GB Airways. After marrying in 1979, he moved with his wife to England, where he worked for the Russian airline Aeroflot at Heathrow.

In 1981, Licudi and wife returned to Gibraltar, where he was hired by the Castle Marketing Group, of Joe Holliday. At this time he also joined the GSLP, and after the 1984 elections, was invited to join the party's executive. During this same period he began writing a weekly column for The People.

At age 28, he was a member of the GSLP executive when he decided to move away from Gibraltar and study law in Chelmsford, Essex. He concluded his studies at the Inns of Court School of Law, London, and was admitted as a barrister in 1992, in both London and Gibraltar.

Licudi made a career in Hassans International Law Firm, where he worked with Peter Montegriffo. At this time, he came back to politics, willing to bring his experience of conflict resolution in favour of the political changes he thought necessary about Gibraltar.

In 2007, Licudi ran for the GSLP in the general elections. He was appointed Shadow Minister for Employment, Traffic, Youth and Sport. In April 2011, when Fabian Picardo became leader of the GSLP (and of the Opposition), Licudi was appointed Minister of Education, Financial Services and Transportation, and the areas of Youth and Sport were transferred to Steven Linares.

With the GSLP victory in the general elections of 2011, Licudi was appointed Minister of Education, Financial Services, Gaming, Telecommunications and Justice. In 2012 Licudi opened new purpose built Law courts in Gibraltar.

Licudi was appointed a Queen's Counsel (Q.C.) in 2012, which became King's Counsel (K.C.) upon the death of Queen Elizabeth II (demise of the Crown on 8 September 2022.

In 2013, after the by-election, the Financial Services and Gaming portfolios were transferred to the new elected minister, Albert Isola.
