= 2013 Gibraltar by-election =

3rd Gibraltar by-election

← 2011	4 July 2013	2015 →

One seat in the Gibraltar Parliament
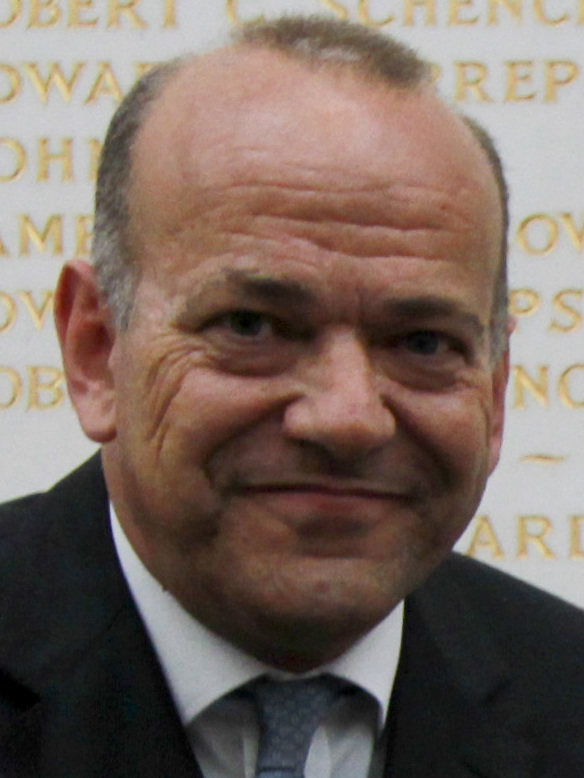

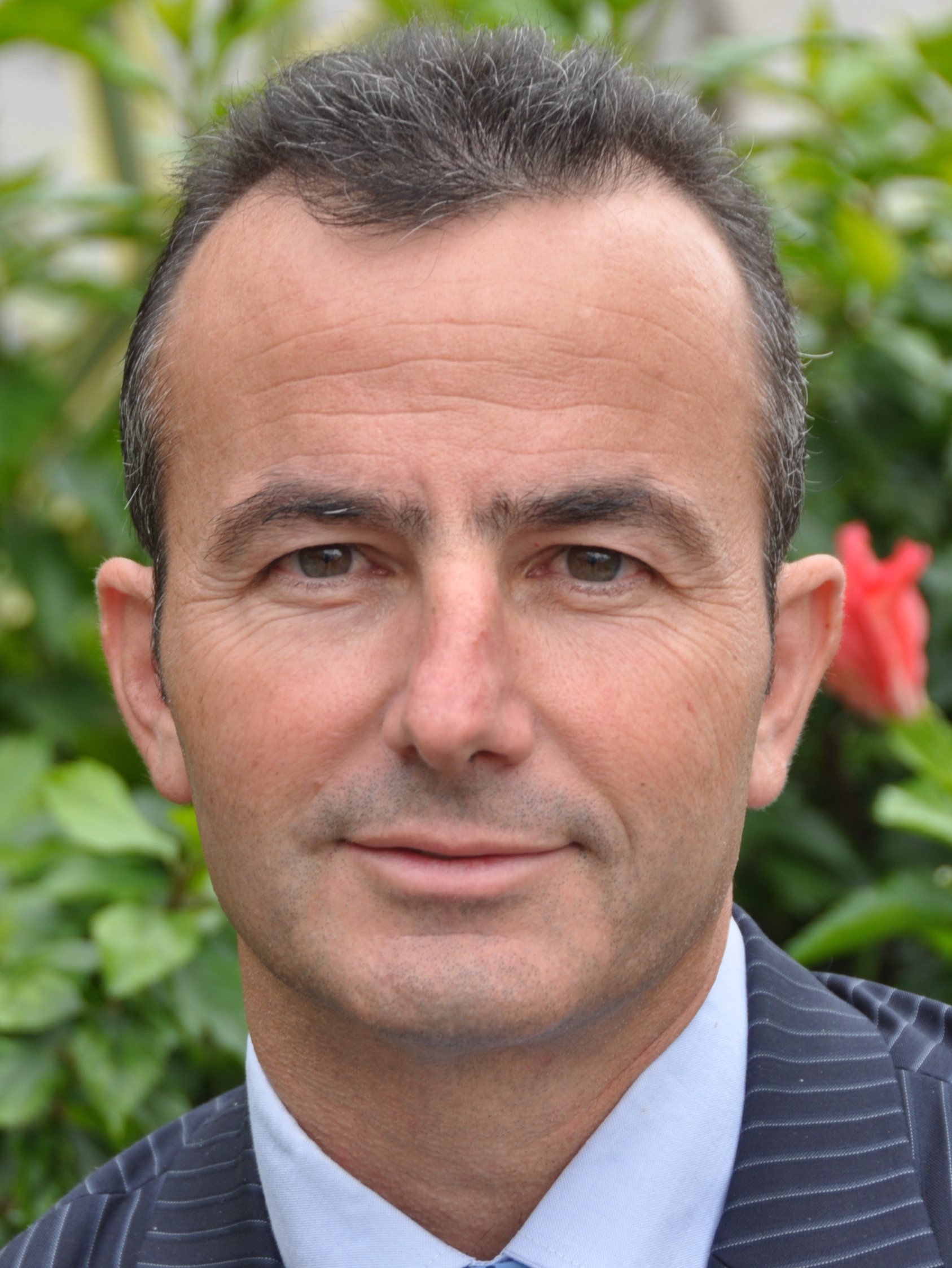
Candidate	Albert Isola	Marlene Hassan-Nahon	Nick Cruz
Party	Socialist Labour	Social Democrats	Progressive Democratic
Popular vote	4,899	3,927	688
Percentage	49.84%	39.95%	7.00%
Candidate	Bryan Zammit
Party	Independent
Popular vote	315
Percentage	3.20%
MP before election
Charles Bruzon
Socialist Labour
Subsequent MP
Albert Isola
Socialist Labour

A by-election was held to the Gibraltar Parliament on 4 July 2013 to fill the seat left vacant by the death of Housing Minister Charles Bruzon in April 2013. The Gibraltar Socialist Labour Party (GSLP), Gibraltar Social Democrats (GSD), Progressive Democratic Party (PDP) and an independent contested the by-election. The Liberal Party of Gibraltar who is in alliance and in Government with the GSLP backed the GSLP's candidate.

The Gibraltar Broadcasting Corporation's pre-election poll gave the GSLP's candidate Albert Isola an advantage of almost 5% over the GSD's Marlene Hassan-Nahon. It was also the last elections that the Progressive Democratic Party had taken part before their disbandment over a month later that same year.

== Background ==
Charles Bruzon was a member of the Gibraltar Socialist Labour Party (GSLP) and the Government's Housing Minister since 9 December 2011. His seat in the Gibraltar Parliament became vacant following his death on 16 April 2013 aged 74, following a long battle with illness. On 20 May 2013, Chief Minister Fabian Picardo met with Governor Sir Adrian Johns at The Convent and asked him to issue a writ for the by-election. The Chief Minister then made the announcement in Parliament later that day calling for candidates to sign up by noon on 14 June.

Picardo confirmed that the GSLP would, in alliance with the Liberal Party field a candidate for election. He announced it would be a GSLP candidate but that the alliance would fight the election jointly. The Gibraltar Social Democrats as Opposition had initially decided not to contest the by-election considering instead a "gentleman's agreement" as the seat had been one of the GSLP which had become vacant under tragic circumstances. The Progressive Democratic Party (PDP) which was not represented in Parliament immediately decided it would contest the by-election seeing it as an opportunity to be represented despite its poor performance at the previous two general elections. On 30 May 2013 the PDP announced its candidature of party leader Nick Cruz. At this point the GSD was reconsidering its decision not to contest the by-election as its leader, Daniel Feetham, said it would be "illogical" for the elected Opposition not to do so if the PDP signed up. The party announced, via its Twitter account on 5 June 2013, that it had chosen former Chief Minister Joshua Hassan's daughter Marlene Hassan-Nahon, as its candidate. The GSLP chose former Member of the then House of Assembly Albert Isola, son of former Leader of the Opposition Peter Isola, as the party's candidate on 9 June 2013. The final candidate to sign up on 12 June 2013 was independent Bryan Zammit.

== Opinion polls ==
A public opinion poll commissioned by the Gibraltar Broadcasting Corporation (GBC) predicted a close running between Isola and Nahon. The survey was carried out over six days on 500 eligible voters through face-to-face interviews, representing 2.5% of the Gibraltarian electorate. The poll's results were published on 24 June 2013 and showed Isola with 41.4%, Nahon with 36.5%, Zammit with 11.9% and Cruz with 8.2% support amongst the interviewees with 2% of them yet undecided.

GBC's poll also predicted that the 5.4% of voters who previously voted for the GSLP/Liberals at the 2011 general election would vote for the GSD's candidate, while only 2.4% of those who previously voted for the GSD would vote for the GSLP's candidate.

== Results ==
Candidate	Party	Votes	%
Albert Isola	Gibraltar Socialist Labour Party	4,899	49.84
Marlene Hassan-Nahon	Gibraltar Social Democrats	3,927	39.95
Nick Cruz	Progressive Democratic Party	688	7.00
Bryan Zammit	Independent	315	3.20
Total		9,829	100.00
Valid votes		9,829	97.97
Invalid/blank votes		204	2.03
Total votes		10,033	100.00
Registered voters/turnout		21,653	46.34
Source: Parliament of Gibraltar
