= 2011 Gibraltar general election =

- 8 December 2011

All 17 seats in the Gibraltar Parliament 9 seats needed for a majority
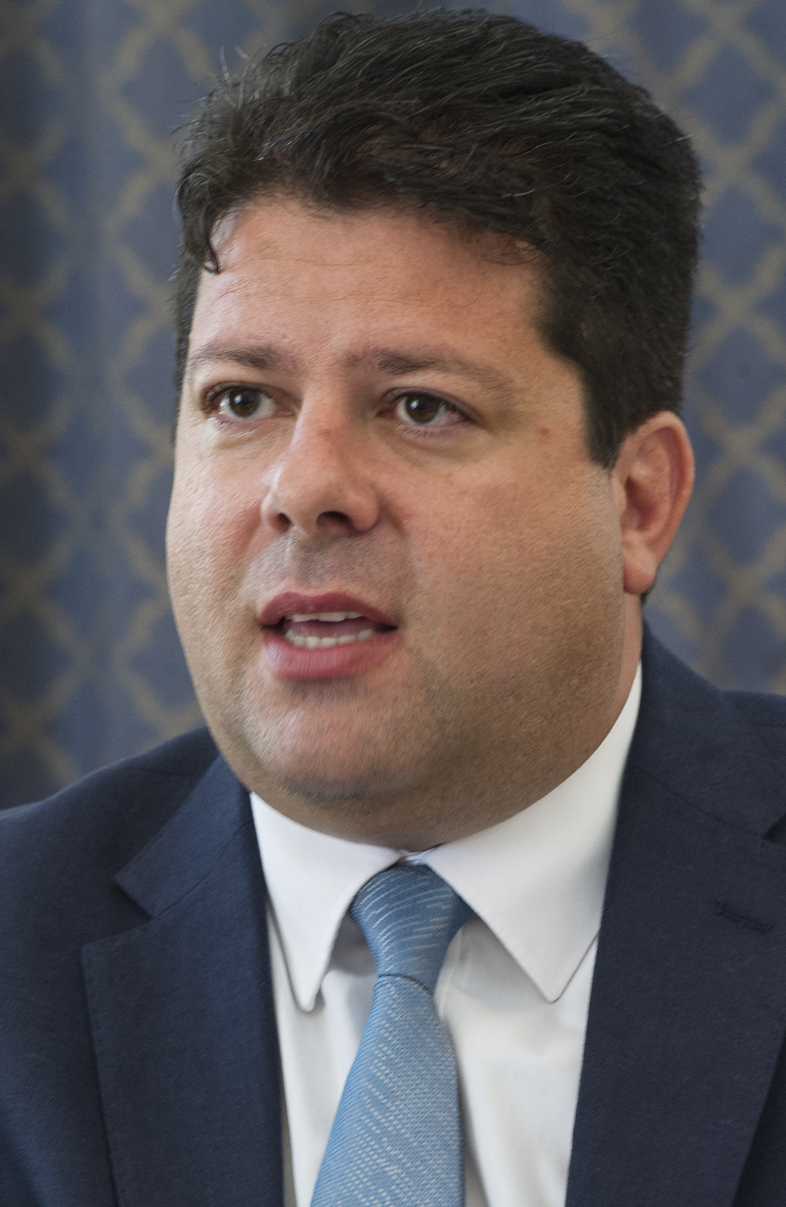

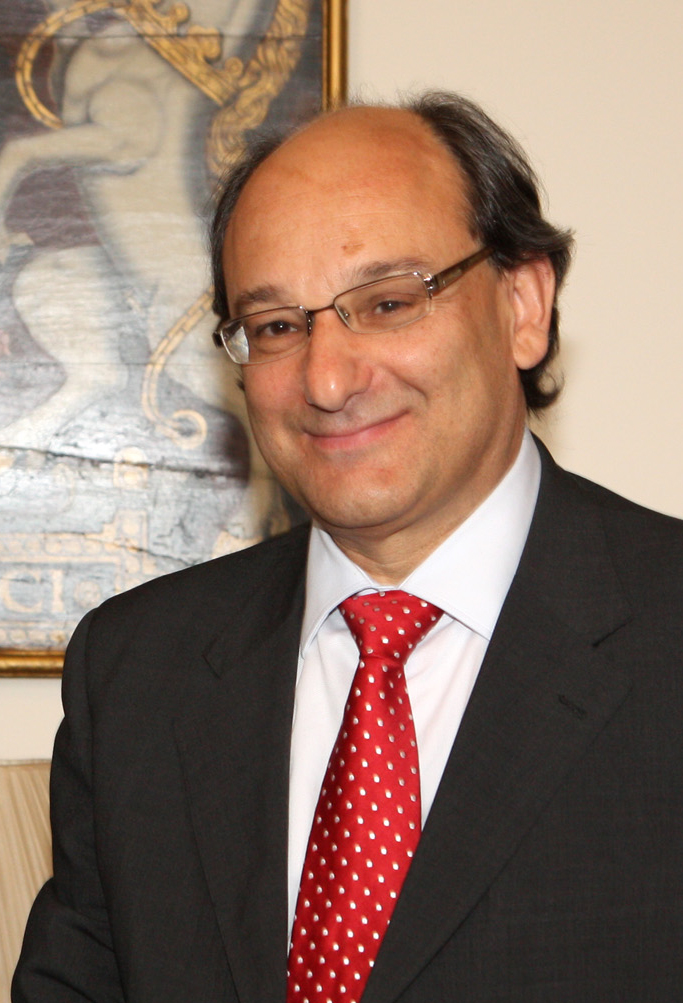
	First party	Second party
Leader	Fabian Picardo	Peter Caruana
Party	Socialist Labour	Social Democrats
Alliance	GSLP–Liberal
Last election	45.49%, 7 seats	49.33%, 10 seats
Seats won	10	7
Seat change	▲3	▼3
Popular vote	85,414	81,721
Percentage	48.88%	46.76%
Swing	▲3.39pp	▼2.57pp
Chief Minister before election
Peter Caruana
Social Democrats
Elected Chief Minister
Fabian Picardo
Socialist Labour

General elections were held in Gibraltar on 8 December 2011. Two parties, the Gibraltar Social Democrats (GSD) and the Progressive Democrative Party (PDP) and an alliance of the Gibraltar Socialist Labour Party (GSLP) and the Liberal Party of Gibraltar (LPG) each presented a full slate of ten candidates each, making a total of thirty candidates standing for seventeen seats in the Gibraltar Parliament. Members of Parliament in Gibraltar are elected "at-large" in a single electoral area covering the whole territory.

Several pre-election polls gave the GSLP an advantage of up to 9% over the governing party, the GSD, while one (that of the Spanish newspaper Area, which published no details and was widely thought to be politically motivated) predicted a GSD win.

== Contesting parties ==
Two parties, the Gibraltar Social Democrats (GSD) and the Progressive Democratic Party (PDP), and an alliance (Gibraltar Socialist Labour Party (GSLP)/Liberals) presented a full slate of 10 candidates each, making a total of 30 candidates for 17 seats in the Gibraltar Parliament.

=== Party slogans and election logos ===
Party or alliance	Slogan
GSLP/Libs Alliance	"A New Dawn...It's Time for Change"
GSD	"Gibraltar has never been better...Keep Trusting"
Progressive Democratic Party	"The Real Change"

=== Incumbent MPs (from 2007) ===
MP	Party	Seeking re-election?	Parliamentary role(s)
Peter Caruana (from 1991) (Note: Elected in 1991 by-election after the resignation of former AACR MP and Founder and first GSD Leader, Peter Montegriffo. He had beaten his opponent, AACR's Douglas Henrich (2496 vs 1542 votes).)	GSD	Yes	Chief Minister (from 1996); Leader of GSD (from 1992)
Fabian Vinet (from 2003)	GSD	Yes	Minister for Heritage, Culture, Youth and Sport (2007); Minister for Housing (2007–2011)
Jaime Netto (from 1996)	GSD	Yes	Minister for the Environment (2007); Minister for Family, Youth and Community Affairs (2007–2011)
Ernest Britto (from 1996)	GSD	No	Minister for Health (2007); Minister for the Environment, Traffic and Transport (2007–2011)
Joseph Holliday (from 1996)	GSD	Yes	Minister for Trade, Industry, Employment and Communications (2007); Minister for Enterprise, Development and Technology & Deputy Chief Minister (2007–2011)
Clive Beltran (from 2003)	GSD	Yes	Minister for Housing (2007); Minister for Education and Training (2007–2011)
Joseph Bossano (from 1972)	GSLP–Liberal Alliance (GSLP) (from 1980)	Yes	Leader of Opposition (1996–April 2011); Founder and Leader of GSLP (1980–April 2011); Leader of Alliance (2000–April 2011); Shadow Minister (from April 2011)
Yvette Del Agua (from 2000)	GSD	Yes	Minister for Social Affairs (2007); Minister for Health and Civil Protection (2007–2011)
Daniel Feetham	GSD	Yes	Minister for Justice (2007–2011)
Fabian Picardo (from 2003)	GSLP–Liberal Alliance (GSLP)	Yes	Shadow Minister for Trade, Industry, Tourism, Financial Services and Justice (2007-April 2011); Leader of Opposition (from April 2011); Leader of GSLP and Alliance (from April 2011)
Luis Montiel	GSD	No	Minister for Employment, Labour and Industrial Relations (2007–2011)
Edwin Reyes	GSD	Yes	Minister for Culture, Heritage, Sport and Leisure (2007–2011)
Joseph Garcia (from 1999) (Note: Elected in 1999 by-election after the death of elected GSLP MP and Shadow Minister & former Mayor of Gibraltar, Robert Mor)	GSLP–Liberal Alliance (LPG)	Yes	Shadow Minister for European Affairs, Transport, Tourism, Heritage, Civil Aviation, Postal Services & IT and E-Government (from 2000); Leader of LPG (from 1992)
Gilbert Licudi	GSLP–Liberal Alliance (GSLP)	Yes	Shadow Minister for Employment, Traffic, Youth and Sport
Charles Bruzon	GSLP–Liberal Alliance (GSLP)	Yes	Shadow Minister for Housing
Neil Costa	GSLP–Liberal Alliance (LPG)	Yes	Shadow Minister for Health and Social Services
Steven Linares (from 2000)	GSLP–Liberal Alliance (LPG)	Yes	Shadow Minister for Education, Culture, Sport, Youth and Civic Rights

== Opinion polls ==
Several pre-election polls gave the GSLP an advantage of up to 9% over the governing party, the GSD, while one (that of Spanish paper Area, which published no details and was thought to be politically motivated) predicted a GSD win.

== Results ==
Party or alliance		Votes	%	Seats	+/–
Alliance	Gibraltar Socialist Labour Party	59,824	34.23	7	+3
Alliance	Liberal Party of Gibraltar	25,590	14.64	3	0
Alliance	Total	85,414	48.88	10	+3
Gibraltar Social Democrats		81,721	46.76	7	−3
Progressive Democratic Party		7,622	4.36	0	0
Total		174,757	100.00	17	0
Total votes		17,915	–		
Registered voters/turnout		21,712	82.51		
Source: Parliament of Gibraltar

=== By candidate ===
Candidate	Party	Alliance	Votes	Notes
Fabian Picardo	GSLP	GSLP-Liberal Alliance	8781	Elected
John Cortes	GSLP	GSLP-Liberal Alliance	8706	Elected
Joseph Garcia	LPG	GSLP-Liberal Alliance	8681	Elected
Gilbert Licudi	GSLP	GSLP-Liberal Alliance	8605	Elected
Joseph Bossano	GSLP	GSLP-Liberal Alliance	8598	Elected
Charles Bruzon	GSLP	GSLP-Liberal Alliance	8518	Elected
Peter Caruana	GSD	None	8515	Elected
Neil Costa	LPG	GSLP-Liberal Alliance	8490	Elected
Daniel Feetham	GSD	None	8462	Elected
Steven Linares	LPG	GSLP-Liberal Alliance	8419	Elected
Samantha Sacramento	GSLP	GSLP-Liberal Alliance	8335	Elected
Isobel Ellul-Hammond	GSD	None	8306	Elected
Paul Balban	GSLP	GSLP-Liberal Alliance	8281	Elected
Damon Bossino	GSD	None	8281	Elected
Edwin Reyes	GSD	None	8165	Elected
Jaime Netto	GSD	None	8139	Elected
Selwyn Figueras	GSD	None	8099	Elected
Lianne Azzopardi	GSD	None	7944	
Yvette Del Agua	GSD	None	7906	Unseated
Joseph Holliday	GSD	None	7904	Unseated
Keith Azopardi	PDP	None	1896	
Nick Cruz	PDP	None	854	
Elliot Phillips	PDP	None	687	
Kenneth Navas	PDP	None	653	
Giselle Sene	PDP	None	624	
Rebecca Faller	PDP	None	606	
Rosemarie Peach	PDP	None	606	
Moira Walsh	PDP	None	589	
Dilipkumar Tailor	PDP	None	588	
David Eveson	PDP	None	519	
