= Isobel Ellul-Hammond =

Gibraltarian politician

The Honourable Isobel Ellul-Hammond MP

HM Opposition Spokeswoman with responsibility for Health, Civil Contingencies and Social Services
- Incumbent
- Assumed office December 2011

Personal details
- Born: Isobel Marie Ellul-Hammond; 26 November 1979 (age 46) Gibraltar
- Party: Gibraltar Social Democrats (GSD)
- Children: 2
- Education: University of Bath; University of Leicester
- Occupation: teacher
- Known for: Breast Cancer Awareness Charity

The Hon. Isobel Marie Ellul-Hammond MBE, (born 26 November 1979) is a Gibraltarian politician.

She has been a Member of the Gibraltar Parliament for the Gibraltar Social Democrats (GSD) since 2011. In 2007, she founded the Breast Cancer Awareness Charity, and also helped inaugurate the Prostate Cancer Support Group Gibraltar.

She was made a Member of the Most Excellent Order of the British Empire (MBE) at the Queen's 2011 New Year Honours for services to the community in Gibraltar.
