= Peter Caruana =

Gibraltarian lawyer & former politician

The Honourable Sir Peter Caruana KCMG, KC
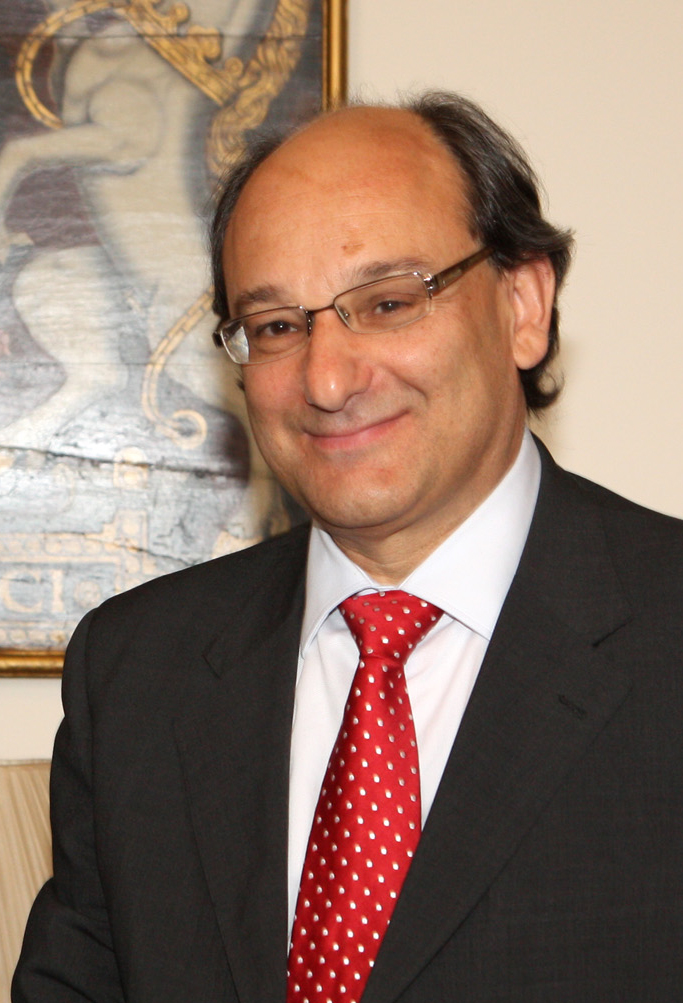

6th Chief Minister of Gibraltar
- In office 17 May 1996 – 9 December 2011
- Monarch: Elizabeth II
- Governor: Sir Hugo White; Sir Richard Luce; Sir David Durie; Sir Francis Richards; Sir Robert Fulton; Sir Adrian Johns
- Preceded by: Joe Bossano
- Succeeded by: Fabian Picardo

Leader of the Opposition
- In office 9 December 2011 – 10 January 2013
- Monarch: Elizabeth II
- Deputy: Daniel Feetham
- Preceded by: Fabian Picardo
- Succeeded by: Daniel Feetham
- In office 16 January 1992 – 17 May 1996
- Monarch: Elizabeth II
- Preceded by: Adolfo Canepa
- Succeeded by: Joe Bossano

Personal details
- Born: 15 October 1956 (age 69) Gibraltar
- Party: Gibraltar Social Democrats (since 1990)
- Spouse: Cristina Triay
- Children: 7
- Education: Queen Mary College, University of London
- Website: gibraltar.gov.gi/office-of-the-chief-minister

Sir Peter Richard Caruana, KCMG KC (born 15 October 1956) is a Gibraltarian former politician who served as Chief Minister of Gibraltar from 1996 to 2011 and Leader of the Gibraltar Social Democrats (GSD) from 1991 to 2013. He is the longest serving Chief Minister to date. A barrister by profession, Caruana was appointed a Queen's Counsel for Gibraltar in 1998 (which became King's Counsel upon the death of Queen Elizabeth II), and elected an Overseas Master of the Bench of Inner Temple in 2011.

== Early and personal life ==
Caruana was born in Gibraltar and is of Maltese and Italian descent. He was educated at the Christian Brothers School in Gibraltar, and then Grace Dieu Manor School and the independent Ratcliffe College (both in Leicestershire, England), and finally Queen Mary College, University of London and the Council of Legal Education. Before serving as Chief Minister, he was a partner in the law firm Triay & Triay. He is married to Cristina, daughter of Joseph Triay, a local barrister. He has seven children: Michael, Georgina, Nicola, Philippa, Patrick, Timothy and James. His leisure interests are golf, and political and current affairs.

== Politics ==
Prior to being elected to Government his political career progressed steadily. In 1990, Caruana became a member of the Gibraltar Social Democrats. One year later, he became leader of the party and in May 1991 gained a seat in the House of Assembly by winning Gibraltar's first contested by-election. In January 1992, Caruana led his party to the position of official opposition by winning seven seats in the House of Assembly. Finally, in May 1996, he led the party to victory and became Chief Minister of Gibraltar.

The GSD which he led from 1991 to 2012, is robustly against any transfer of sovereignty to Spain, but remains in favour of safe dialogue. As Chief Minister, Caruana consistently refused to attend bi-lateral talks between the United Kingdom and Spain as part of the UK delegation, on the basis that the interests of the Gibraltarians were not protected, and he did not want to give any measure of legitimacy to talks over which Gibraltar had no control.

In 2002, he called a referendum on the subject of the proposed joint sovereignty deal, which led to it being abandoned.

In December 2004, the principle of tripartite talks, with the Government of Gibraltar as an equal party with the UK and Spain, was finally recognised, largely as a result of his involvement. This resulted in the Cordoba Agreement which improved communications between Gibraltar and Spain with direct flights from Madrid which subsequently collapsed due to a lack of demand, and in Spain finally recognising Gibraltar's international dialling code, thereby ending a long-standing dispute.

In November 2007, he was returned to office for a fourth term. Under his leadership, the Gibraltar Social Democrats were narrowly beaten in the general election of December 2011 by their rival party, the coalition between the Gibraltar Socialist Labour Party and the Liberal Party of Gibraltar, who won said election by 1.2%. On 9 January 2013, Caruana made it public that he would stand down from the party leadership and as Leader of the Opposition at the end of the month.

== Awards ==
Caruana was appointed a Queen's Counsel for Gibraltar in 1998. In 2003, he was appointed Knight Grand Cross of Merit of the Sacred Military Constantinian Order of Saint George by Prince Carlo, Duke of Castro. Caruana was also appointed Knight Commander of the Order of St Michael and St George (KCMG) in the 2013 Birthday Honours for services to Gibraltar.

== See also ==
- List of Gibraltarians
- Politics of Gibraltar
- History of the Maltese in Gibraltar

Political offices
Preceded by Joe Bossano	Chief Minister of Gibraltar; 1996–2011	Succeeded by Fabian Picardo
