= Charles Bruzon =

Gibraltarian politician and priest

The Honorable Charles Bruzon MP
- Charles Bruzon

Minister for Housing and the Elderly
- In office 2011–2013

Shadow Minister for Housing
- In office 2003–2011

Member of the Gibraltar Parliament
- In office 2003–2013

Personal details
- Born: Charles Arthur Bruzon; 10 June 1938 Gibraltar
- Died: 16 April 2013 (aged 74) Gibraltar
- Party: Gibraltar Socialist Labour Party (GSLP)
- Parent: Luis Francis Bruzon (father)
- Education: Ushaw College
- Occupation: Politician
- Website: Charles Bruzon at the Government of Gibraltar website

Charles Arthur Bruzon (10 June 1938 – 16 April 2013) was a Gibraltarian politician and former Roman Catholic priest. He was affiliated with the Gibraltar Socialist Labour Party (GSLP). In the general elections of 2011, he was elected to the Gibraltar Parliament and appointed Minister for Housing and the Elderly.

== Early life and education ==
Despite being the son of a City Councillor and former member of the Legislative Council Luis Francis Bruzon, Bruzon's political vocation came after a religious vocation. In his youth, he studied for six years in the Ushaw College (a Catholic seminary) at Durham University, which he left after being ordained. His family is originally from Genoa.

== Career ==
=== Ordained ministry ===
Bruzon was ordained as a priest 1962. He was sent to Gibraltar and remained there for seven years as curate of the Bishop John Farmer Healy. However, after seven years in office, he began questioning his choice. It was not just a question of celibacy, since he says he fell in love with his future wife over a year after having leaving his clerical post but he was feeling that the church had moved away from people. According to Bruzon, despite having shown sympathy for the personal dilemma of the parish priest, his superiors could do little to speed up the Vatican's dispensation process from priestly obligations, which took eighteen months to be realized.

=== Later career ===
After leaving the clerical life, he got a job accounting for the Castle Marketing Group, where he worked for three years for the father of Joe Holliday. However, newly married and pressured by the lack of housing in Gibraltar, he decided to take a job in Hatton Garden in London. He worked at South Africa's Deciduous Fruit Board in the Strand in London. Their two children were born during their stay in England. in 1987 he returned to Gibraltar with his family.

Working in a furniture shop, Bruzon claims to have come into contact with the problems of the population of the Rock, not only insofar as it concerns the issue of housing (or lack thereof), but also the difficulty in delivering furniture, because of the way that many of the local houses had been designed. But his political activism work only began to develop in 1996, when he joined the Voice of Gibraltar Group and went to the European Parliament in Strasbourg, asking for a resolution concerning the pressures of Spain against the residents of Gibraltar.

=== Political career ===
In 2001, Bruzon joined the Gibraltar Socialist Labour Party (GSLP). In the 2003 general election, he was elected to the Gibraltar Parliament. He received the third highest number of votes of the opposition, along with another newcomer, Lucio Randall. Appointed Shadow Minister for Housing, Bruzon said he had carefully studied all the promises made by the Gibraltar Social Democrats (GSD) since 1996, about a solution to the chronic housing question in the Rock. In his analysis, the problem worsened during the administration of Peter Caruana (from 1996 to 2011).

He was re-elected to the Parliament in 2007 and remained as Minister for Housing. In 2011, with the victory of the GSLP/Liberal alliance in the general elections, he was appointed Minister for Housing and the Elderly.

From 2003, Bruzon was a member of the Christian Socialist Movement.

== Death ==
Bruzon died on 16 April 2013 at age 74.

== Personal life ==
His nephew, Fr Charles Bruzon, is the military chaplain aboard HMS Daring.
