= Joe Holliday (politician) =

Gibraltarian politician (born 1958)

The Hon. Joseph John Holliday MP

Deputy Chief Minister of Gibraltar
- In office 16 May 1996 – 8 December 2011
- Monarch: Elizabeth II
- Governor: Hugo White; Richard Luce; David Durie; Francis Richards; Robert Fulton; Adrian Johns

Government Minister
- In office May 1996 – 8 December 2011

Personal details
- Born: 26 September 1958 (age 67) Gibraltar
- Party: Gibraltar Social Democrats
- Children: Joseph, Nicola and Alexandra
- Occupation: Politician
- Website: www.gsdlive.gi

Joseph John Holliday (born 26 September 1958) is a former Gibraltarian politician and member of the Gibraltar Social Democrats. He served as Gibraltar's Minister for Tourism and Deputy Chief Minister and Minister for Trade and Enterprise with responsibility for economic development until the 2011 general election, with Peter Caruana as Chief Minister. Holliday failed to obtain a seat at the Gibraltar Parliament at this election. He was also chairman of Gibtelecom, AquaGib and Gibraltar Electricity Authority. He was also Chairman of the Development and Planning Commission.
