= Gibraltar Social Democrats =

- Leader: Keith Azopardi MP
- Chairman: Jimmy Ignacio
- Founder: Peter Montegriffo
- Founded: 1989; 37 years ago
- Split from: Association for the Advancement of Civil Rights
- Headquarters: 1A College Lane, Gibraltar
- Youth wing: GSD Future
- Ideology: Conservatism; Liberal conservatism
- Political position: Centre-right
- British affiliation: Conservatives (local branch)
- Colours: Blue and yellow
- Parliament: 8 / 17

Website
- www.gsd.gi

The Gibraltar Social Democrats (GSD) is a liberal-conservative, centre-right political party in Gibraltar. The GSD was the governing party for four successive terms in office under the leadership of Peter Caruana, from the 1996 general election until the party's electoral defeat in the 2011 election by the GSLP–Liberal Alliance.

On 30 November 2017, the party underwent their second leadership election as its leader, Daniel Feetham, resigned in July. As a result, 60.6% of the votes (from executives and members of the party) had gone to support rejoined GSD member, Keith Azopardi, who was a minister and Deputy Chief Minister under the first few years of Peter Caruana's run as Chief Minister. Azopardi had beaten interim leader Roy Clinton, who had gained 39.4% of the votes.

== History ==
The party emerged, after the collapse of the Association for the Advancement of Civil Rights, as the main opposition to the Gibraltar Socialist Labour Party (GSLP). The GSD was founded in 1989 by former AACR MP, Peter Montegriffo. When Peter Montegriffo resigned his Parliamentary seat in 1991, Peter Caruana who had become Party Leader won that contested bye-election against the then main opposition Party, the AACR. In 1996 the GSD managed to overturn a massive majority that the then GSLP Government had obtained at the previous 1992 general election and were elected to Government. The first GSD administration was made up of Peter Caruana [as Chief Minister], Peter Montegriffo [as Deputy Chief Minister], Ernest Britto, Hubert Corby, Keith Azopardi, Joe Holliday, Bernard Linares and Jaime Netto.

In 2005, the GSD merged with the Gibraltar Labour Party, retaining the GSD name for the enlarged party. The merger was unpopular with many members of both parties, causing some high-profile GSD members to resign their membership, including deputy leader Keith Azopardi and executive member Nick Cruz, who went on to form the short-lived Progressive Democratic Party.

In January 2013, Peter Caruana (who was the then Leader of the Opposition), announced he was stepping down as leader and taking up a backbench position until his 4-year term was over. Caruana declared that he would not fight the next election and will be stepping out of politics completely. The leadership was contested by two GSD MPs: Daniel Feetham and Damon Bossino. Feetham was elected on 4 February 2013 as Leader of the party by majority vote of the executive. This was the first time a party's leadership was to be democratically contested between two candidates.

== Policies ==
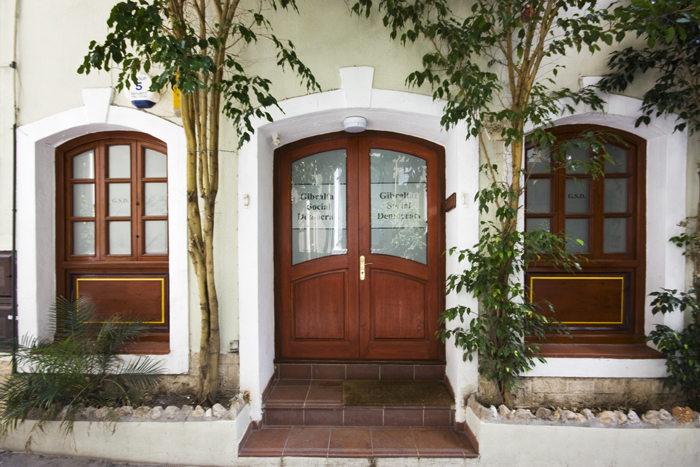
Headquarters of the Gibraltar Social Democrats in College Lane, Gibraltar.

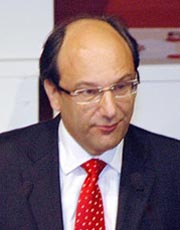
Former Leader of the GSD, Peter Caruana, QC

Despite the name of the party suggesting that it is a social democratic party, the GSD has been described as liberal-conservative and centre-right. The party supports the current constitutional status of Gibraltar as a self-governing British overseas territory and is opposed to any proposal of joint British–Spanish sovereignty. The GSD has traditionally been less hostile in its attitude to Spain than its main rival, the Gibraltar Socialist Labour Party.

== Elections ==
In the 1991 by-election to the Gibraltar House of Assembly, following the resignation of GSD Leader Peter Montegriffo, Peter Caruana was elected party leader and won 61.81% of the popular vote to fill in the vacant seat.

In the 1992 election, the party won 20.20% of the popular vote and 7 seats.

In the 1996 election, the party won 52.20% of the popular vote and 8 seats.

In the 2000 election, the party won 58.35% of the popular vote and 8 seats.

In the 2003 election, the party won 51.45% of the popular vote and 8 seats.

In the 2007 election to the newly named (and reorganised) Gibraltar Parliament, the party won 49.33% of the popular vote and 10 seats.

In the 2011 election, the party won 46.76% of the popular vote and 7 seats, unable to secure a fifth term.

In the 2013 by-election, the GSD candidate Marlene Hassan Nahon won 39.95% of the popular vote.

In the 2015 election, the party won 31.56% of the popular vote and 7 seats.

The GSD endorsed the Conservative Party in the 2015 British general election.

In the 2019 election, the party won 25.60% of the popular vote. However they lost 1 seat down from 7 to 6 MPs. This resulted in the Party's MP and Shadow Minister, Trevor Hammond, to be unseated and to be taken by Marlene Hassan-Nahon, who recently formed and lead her own progressive party, Together Gibraltar, during the elections.

In the heavily contested 2023 election, the party won 48.15% of the popular vote. They gained 2 more seats, rising 6 to 8, thus returning to become Gibraltar's sole Opposition Party since 2015 (1 seat from the sole TG MP, Marlene Hassan Nahon, who announced a couple months before that she wasn't seeking re-election and was retiring from politics; and the other from The Alliance's new MP, Vijay Daryanani ((LPG)) ).

Two of their new 2023 candidates, Youseff El Hana (who became Gibraltar's first political candidate from the local Muslim/Moroccan community) & Daniela Tilbury received controversy from their past ordeals during the elections. Both of them were polled low and were not elected into Parliament as a result

Youseff's past social media posts from 2018 gained controversy due to them being seen as "antisemitic" for his references of his support for Palestine for the ongoing decades-long internal and religious conflicts between them and Israel. He apologised for offending the local Jewish community on GBC News during the election campaign but denied the accusations of him attending an anti-semitic Palestinian march.

Daniella Tilbury also received controversy due to her past allegations of bullying her staff and students during her chair and executive roles at the University of Gibraltar, resulting for her to resign from her posts. No formal apology was made during her campaign.

After the General Elections, there was the party’s leadership elections between the incumbent Party and Opposition Leader, Keith Azopardi and his colleague, Damon Bossino, who was appointed Shadow Minister for Housing, Lands & Transport. The former identifies himself as a centrist and progressive GSD MP whilst the latter identifies as a more conservative figure. On December, the results were in favour of Azopardi with 58% compared to his opponent with 42%.

== Election results ==
=== Parliament of Gibraltar ===
Election	Votes	%	Seats	+/–	Government
1992	20,110	20.2	7 / 15	▲6	Opposition
1996	66,190	52.2	8 / 15	▲1	Government
2000	67,443	58.35	8 / 15	Steady	Government
2003	58,234	51.45	8 / 15	Steady	Government
2007	76,334	49.33	10 / 17	▲2	Government
2011	81,721	46.76	7 / 17	▼3	Opposition
2015	46,545	31.56	7 / 17	Steady	Opposition
2019	40,453	25.55	6 / 17	▼1	Main Opposition
2023	86,537	48.15	8 / 17	▲2	Opposition

=== By-elections ===
Election	Votes	%	Seats	+/–
1991	2,496	61.81	1 / 1	New
2013	3,927	39.95	0 / 1	Steady

=== European Parliament ===
Gibraltar was part of the South West England constituency in the European parliament and its major parties formed joint ticket alliances with the major UK parties. From 2004 until Brexit, the Gibraltar Social Democrats were in an alliance with the Conservatives.

Election	Party	SW England		Gibraltar		Seats	+/–
Election	Party	Votes	%	Votes	%	Seats	+/–
2004	Conservative	457,371	31.6	8,297	69.5	3 / 7	▼1
2009	Conservative	468,742	30.2	3,721	53.3	3 / 7	Steady
2014	Conservative	433,151	28.9	1,236	17.2	2 / 6	▼1
2019	Conservative	144,674	8.7	256	2.7	0 / 6	▼2

== Current GSD MPs ==
- Keith Azopardi (1996-2003; since 2019) (Leader of the Opposition)
- Edwin Reyes (since 2007)
- Roy Clinton (since 2015)
- Damon Bossino (2011-2015; since 2019)
- Joelle Ladislaus (since 2023)
- Giovanni Origo (since 2023)
- Craig Sacarello (since 2023)
- Atrish Sanchez (since 2023)

== List of Leaders ==
Name	Term in office	Portrait
Peter Montegriffo	1989-1991	
Peter Caruana	May 1991 - January 2013	
Daniel Feetham	January 2013 - July 2017	
Roy Clinton (interim)	July 2017 - November 2017	
Keith Azopardi	November 2017 – present	
