= Liberal Party of Gibraltar =

- Leader: Joseph Garcia
- Founded: 1991; 35 years ago
- Preceded by: National Party of Gibraltar
- Headquarters: 95 Irish Town, Gibraltar
- Youth wing: Gibraltar Liberal Youth
- Ideology: Liberalism; Social liberalism Pro-Europeanism; Gibraltar self-determination
- Political position: Centre to centre-left
- National affiliation: GSLP–Liberal Alliance
- European affiliation: Alliance of Liberals and Democrats for Europe
- International affiliation: Liberal International
- British affiliation: Liberal Democrats
- Colours: Red and white
- Gibraltar Parliament: 2 / 17

Website
- www.liberal.gi

The Liberal Party of Gibraltar (Libs or LPG) is a liberal political party in Gibraltar. It was founded in 1991 as the Gibraltar National Party and is led by Dr. Joseph Garcia. The LPG forms the GSLP–Liberal Alliance in partnership with the Gibraltar Socialist Labour Party.

== Policy ==
In line with most liberal parties, the party describes their political philosophy as being based on notions of people deciding their own future, and are committed to Gibraltarian self-determination regarding constitutional arrangements.

The party believes in

"freedom, responsibility, tolerance, social justice and equality of opportunity: these are the central values of liberalism, and they remain the principles on which an open society must be built. These principles require a careful balance of strong civil societies, democratic government, free markets, and international cooperation".

—

The party makes its stance on economic policy very clear, stating that

"open societies need open markets. A liberal, open and tolerant society requires a market economy. Political freedom and economic freedom belong together".

—

== Elections ==
In the 1992 election to the Gibraltar House of Assembly, the party (as the GNP) won 4.7%% of the popular vote and no seats.

In the 1996 election the GNP won 4.68% of the popular vote and no seats.

In the 1999 by-election, following the death of GSLP Opposition MP Robert Mor, Liberal Party leader Dr. Joseph Garcia won 51.46% of the popular vote and the seat. He was the first joint GSLP/Liberal candidate to contest an election.

In the 2000 election the party won (in alliance with the GSLP) 14.95% of the popular vote and 2 seats.

In the 2003 election the party won (in alliance with the GSLP) 14.61% of the popular vote and 2 seats.

In the 2007 election to the newly named (and re-organized) Gibraltar Parliament, the party won (in alliance with the GSLP) 13.65% of the popular vote and 3 seats.

In the 2011 election, the party won (in alliance with the GSLP) 14.64% of the popular vote and 3 seats forming the new Government of Gibraltar.

In the 2013 by-election, following the death of Housing Minister Charles Bruzon (GSLP), the Liberal Party backed the GSLP candidate Albert Isola, who has won 49.84% of the popular vote to fill in the vacant seat.

In the 2015 election, the party won (in alliance with the GSLP) 20.61% of the popular vote and retained their 3 seats.

In the 2019 election, the party won (in alliance with the GSLP) 15.5% of the popular vote and retained their 3 seats. At the election, Liberal MP & Minister, Neil Costa, stood down for re-election. His seat was retained by fellow party member, Vijay Daryanani, whom he became Gibraltar's first MP from the local Hindu community.

In the heavily contested 2023 election, the party won (in alliance with the GSLP) 14.6% of the popular vote. However, they lost one of their 3 seats to the sole contesting GSD opposition party. This resulted in the Party's new MP, Vijay Daryanani, losing his seat after only serving one term in office as Minister.

== Election results ==
=== Parliament of Gibraltar ===
Election	Votes	%	Seats	+/–	Government
1992	2,158	4.7	0 / 15		Extra-parliamentary
1996	5,932	4.68	0 / 15	Steady	Extra-parliamentary
2000	17,286	14.95	2 / 15	▲1	Coalition Opposition (Minor Party)
2003	16,538	14.61	2 / 15	Steady	Coalition Opposition (Minor Party)
2007	21,120	13.65	3 / 17	▲1	Coalition Opposition (Minor Party)
2011	25,590	14.64	3 / 17	Steady	Coalition Government (Minor Party)
2015	30,399	20.61	3 / 17	Steady	Coalition Government (Minor Party)
2019	24,546	15.50	3 / 17	Steady	Coalition Government (Minor Party)
2023	26,241	14.60	2 / 17	▼1	Coalition Government (Minor Party)

=== By-elections ===
Election	Votes	%	Seats	+/–
1999	4,395	51.47	1 / 1	▲1

=== European Parliament ===
Gibraltar was part of the South West England constituency in the European parliament and its major parties formed joint ticket alliances with the major UK parties. From 2004 until Brexit, the Liberal Party of Gibraltar was in an alliance with the Liberal Democrats.

Election	Party	SW England		Gibraltar		Seats	+/–
Election	Party	Votes	%	Votes	%	Seats	+/–
2004	Liberal Democrats	265,619	18.3	905	7.6	1 / 7	Steady
2009	Liberal Democrats	266,253	17.2	1,269	18.2	1 / 7	Steady
2014	Liberal Democrats	160,376	10.7	4,822	67.2	0 / 6	▼1
2019	Liberal Democrats	385,095	23.2	7,270	77.4	2 / 6	▲2

== Affiliations ==
The Liberal Party of Gibraltar is a member of the Liberal International and the Alliance of Liberals and Democrats for Europe, having joined the latter in November 2014. It is also a 'Sister Party' of the United Kingdom Liberal Democrats and contested the South-West England constituency at European Parliamentary elections on a joint ticket with them taking place six on the party list.

== Current LPG MPs ==
- Joseph Garcia (since 1999)
- Leslie Bruzon (since 2023)

== See also ==
- Liberal parties by country
- List of major liberal parties considered left
