= Gibraltar Socialist Labour Party =

Social-democratic political party in Gibraltar

- Leader: Fabian Picardo
- Chairman: Joseph Baldachino
- Founder: Joe Bossano
- Founded: 1978; 48 years ago
- Split from: Democratic Party for a British Gibraltar
- Headquarters: Suite 16, 3 Watergardens, Waterport Road, Gibraltar
- Youth wing: Gibraltar Socialist Labour Youth
- Ideology: Social democracy Pro-Europeanism
- Political position: Centre-left
- National affiliation: GSLP–Liberal Alliance
- European Parliament group: Progressive Alliance of Socialists and Democrats (2004–09)
- International affiliation: Socialist International (since 2025)
- British affiliation: Labour Party
- Colours: Red, White
- Gibraltar Parliament: 7 / 17

Website
- www.gslp.gi

The Gibraltar Socialist Labour Party (GSLP) is a social-democratic political party in Gibraltar. The GSLP is the oldest surviving active political party in Gibraltar. Its roots are based in the trade union movement, as its founder and former leader Joe Bossano was the District Officer of the Transport and General Workers Union (TGWU). The party has been led since 2011 by Fabian Picardo, who has served as Chief Minister of Gibraltar since the 2011 general election. The GSLP forms the GSLP–Liberal Alliance in partnership with the Liberal Party of Gibraltar.

== History ==
The TGWU during Bossano's tenure was instrumental in achieving parity with the United Kingdom for all workers in Gibraltar. Bossano left the Integration with Britain Party in 1975 and founded the Gibraltar Democratic Movement (GDM), which contested the 1976 election winning four seats in the House of Assembly. The GDM became the Gibraltar Socialist Labour Party in 1978 and obtained one seat, that of Bossano, in the 1980 election. At the elections of 1984, the GSLP capitalized on the Gibraltarian discontent about the way the British Government was handling the future of the Gibraltar Royal Navy dockyard, opposing the transfer of the docks to Appledore Shipbuilders (which involved the loss of about 400 jobs), and winning seven of the fifteen seats of the Assembly. The party was eventually in Government from 1988 to 1996.

In April 2011, Joe Bossano retired as party leader and he was replaced by Fabian Picardo.

== Ideology and policy ==
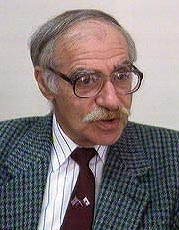
Founder of the GSLP, Joe Bossano

Like all the other parties in Gibraltar, the GSLP supports self-determination for Gibraltar and opposes any moves toward joint British–Spanish sovereignty. The party has strong member and personal ties with the UK Labour Party with many prominent members having been involved with the Labour Party while in the United Kingdom. The GSLP also endorsed the Labour Party at the 2014 European Parliament elections as it had done on previous European elections.

The party strongly supports Gibraltar's territorial integrity, in particular seeks pursuit of the recognition of the full twelve-mile limit to Gibraltar territorial waters, as is the case with other British overseas territories, and it considers Spain's violations of the current three-mile limit of territorial waters as "a hostile and unfriendly act".

The party does not consider Gibraltar to have been decolonised by the Gibraltar Constitution Order 2006 and has a policy of continued participation at all United Nations venues in which Gibraltar is discussed including the Special Committee on Decolonization until the decolonisation of Gibraltar is recognised by the UN and the achievement of a new international status for Gibraltar as a full self-governing territory under the British Crown.

== Elections ==
In the 1980 election to the Gibraltar House of Assembly, the party won its first seat in the House.

In the 1984 election, the party won 34.2% of the popular vote and 7 seats.

In the 1988 election, the party won 58.2% of the popular vote and 8 seats to form the new government.

In the 1992 election, the party won 73.1%% of the popular vote and 8 seats.

In the 1996 election, the party won 42.95% of the popular vote and 7 seats.

In the 1999 by-election following the death of GSLP Opposition MP Robert Mor, Liberal Party leader Dr. Joseph Garcia (backed by the GSLP) won 51.46% of the popular vote and the seat. He was the first joint GSLP/Liberal candidate to contest an election.

In the 2000 election, the party won (in alliance with the Liberals) 25.62% of the popular vote and 5 seats.

In the 2003 election, the party won (in Alliance with the Liberals) 25.08% of the popular vote and 5 seats.

In the 2007 election to the newly named (and re-organized) Gibraltar Parliament, the party won (in Alliance with the Liberals) 31.84% of the popular vote and 4 seats.

In the 2011 election, the party won (in Alliance with the Liberals) 34.23% of the popular vote and 7 seats and, with the 3 seats won by the Liberal Party, formed the new Government of Gibraltar.

In the 2013 by-election, following the death of Housing Minister Charles Bruzon (GSLP), the GSLP candidate Albert Isola won 49.84% of the popular vote to fill in the vacant seat.

In the 2015 election, the party won (in Alliance with the Liberals) 47.83% of the popular vote and 7 seats.

The GSLP was represented in the European Parliament by Glyn Ford MEP of the PES Group during the 6th European Parliament term, however Ford later lost his seat in the 2009 European elections.

The GSLP supported and endorsed the UK Labour Party during elections to the European Parliament.

== Election results ==
=== Parliament of Gibraltar ===
Election	Votes	%	Seats	+/–	Government
1980	17,747	23.75	1 / 15		Opposition
1984	32,534	34.18	7 / 15	▲6	Opposition
1988	60,626	58.22	8 / 15	▲1	Government
1992	65,997	73.07	8 / 15	Steady	Government
1996	54,463	42.95	7 / 15	▼1	Opposition
2000	29,610	25.62	5 / 15	▼1	Opposition Coalition (Major Party)
2003	28,382	25.08	5 / 15	Steady	Opposition Coalition (Major Party)
2007	49,277	31.84	4 / 17	▼1	Opposition Coalition (Major Party)
2011	59,824	34.23	7 / 17	▲3	Coalition Government (Major Party)
2015	70,551	47.83	7 / 17	Steady	Coalition Government (Major Party)
2019	58,576	37.00	7 / 17	Steady	Coalition Government (Major Party)
2023	63,700	35.44	7 / 17	Steady	Coalition Government (Major Party)

=== By-elections ===
Election	Votes	%	Seats	+/–
1999	Backed Liberal candidate		0 / 1	▼1
2013	4,899	49.84	1 / 1	Steady

=== European Parliament ===
Gibraltar was part of the South West England constituency in the European Parliament and its major parties formed joint ticket alliances with the major UK parties. From 2004 until Brexit, the GSLP was in an alliance with Labour.

Election	Party	SW England		Gibraltar		Seats	+/–
Election	Party	Votes	%	Votes	%	Seats	+/–
2004	Labour	209,908	14.5	1,127	9.4	1 / 7	▲1
2009	Labour	118,716	7.7	1,328	19.0	0 / 7	▼1
2014	Labour	206,124	13.7	659	9.2	1 / 6	▲1
2019	Labour	108,100	6.5	411	4.4	0 / 6	▼1

== Party leaders ==
Leader		Tenure	Notes
1	Joe Bossano, MP	1978-April 2011	Chief Minister of Gibraltar from 1988-1996 MP since 1972 (for party since 1980) Economics Minister since 2011
2	Fabian Picardo, MP	April 2011 – present	Chief Minister of Gibraltar from 2011-2026 MP since 2003

== Current GSLP MPs ==
- Joe Bossano (since 1980)
- Fabian Picardo (since 2003)
- John Cortes (since 2011)
- Gemma Arias-Vasquez (since 2023)
- Nigel Feetham (since 2023)
- Patricia Orfila (since 2023)
- Christian Santos (since 2023)
