= Fabian Picardo =

Gibraltarian politician (born 1972)

The Honourable Fabian Picardo KC MP
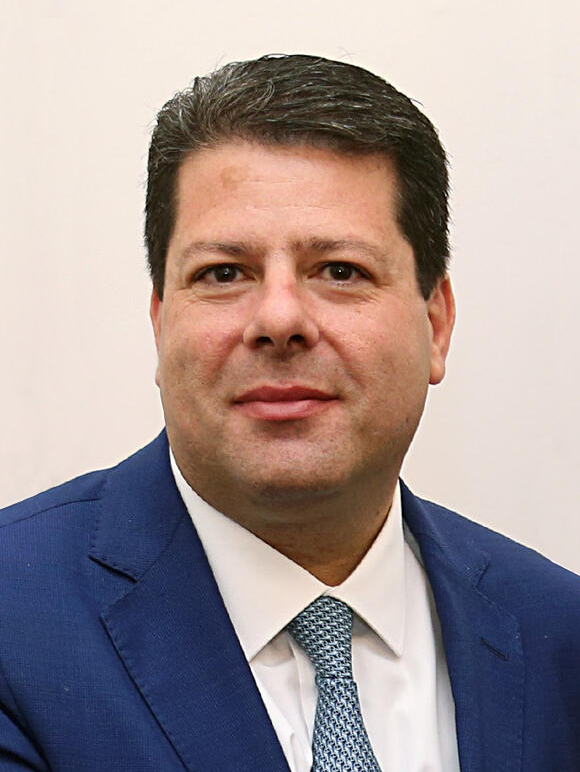
- Picardo in 2019

Chief Minister of Gibraltar
- Incumbent
- Assumed office 9 December 2011
- Monarchs: Elizabeth II; Charles III
- Governor: Sir Adrian Johns; Sir James Dutton; Edward Davis; Sir David Steel; Sir Benjamin Bathurst
- Deputy: Joseph Garcia
- Preceded by: Sir Peter Caruana

Leader of the Opposition
- In office 20 April 2011 – 9 December 2011
- Monarch: Elizabeth II
- Governor: Sir Adrian Johns
- Preceded by: Sir Joe Bossano
- Succeeded by: Sir Peter Caruana

Leader of the Gibraltar Socialist Labour Party
- Incumbent
- Assumed office 20 April 2011
- Preceded by: Sir Joe Bossano

Member of the Parliament of Gibraltar
- Incumbent
- Assumed office 28 November 2003

Personal details
- Born: 18 February 1972 (age 54) Gibraltar
- Party: Socialist Labour (since 2003)
- Other political affiliations: Liberal (1991–2003)
- Spouse: Justine Picardo (m. 2011; sep. 2023) Anna Bosce (m. 2026)
- Children: 3
- Education: Oriel College, Oxford
- Website: Website

Fabian Raymond Picardo (born 18 February 1972) is a Gibraltarian politician and barrister, serving as Chief Minister of Gibraltar and Leader of the Gibraltar Socialist Labour Party since 2011. At the 2015 and 2019 Gibraltar general elections, Picardo was re-elected to two further four-year terms. He was narrowly re-elected for a fourth term in the 2023 Gibraltar general election.

Picardo attended the University of Oxford, where he studied jurisprudence.

== Early life and education ==
Picardo was born on 18 February 1972 in Gibraltar and grew up in the Upper Town area. He has said that the area where he grew up "always made me think about the huge potential that the bay of Gibraltar could have as long as we were able to work together with our Spanish neighbours." His father was a clerical worker for the Ministry of Defence on Gibraltar, and his mother was a personal assistant to Joshua Hassan, the founder of Hassans law firm and a Chief Minister of Gibraltar. Picardo has said that "My parents instilled in me the simple principle of equality, that nobody is better than anybody else and that we shouldn’t look down on absolutely anyone because all of us are created equal." Picardo's grandmother was Spanish, although he has said that the Picardo line came to Gibraltar during the Napoleonic Wars and that he's "particularly proud of that part of [his] bloodline."

Picardo first entertained the idea of becoming a lawyer as the "result of a discussion with a teacher, who I was particularly keen to argue with, who told me that if I wanted to argue I should charge people for it and become a lawyer." When aged 14, he visited Hassans law firm to discuss the idea with the lawyers. From 1990 to 1993, Picardo studied jurisprudence at Oriel College, Oxford. His studies were supported by the grant system introduced by Joe Bossano's Gibraltar Socialist Labour Party government in 1988. Oriel College paid tribute to Picardo's election by flying the flag of Gibraltar, and Picardo has also spoken at Oriel Law Society since his election. Picardo then studied at the Inns of Court School of Gray's Inn and was called to the bar by Middle Temple in 1994.

== Legal career ==
In September 1994, Picardo joined Hassans, the largest law firm in Gibraltar, as an associate. He became a partner in 2000. He was appointed as a Queen's Counsel on 12 June 2014.

== Political career ==
Picardo was a co-founder of the Gibraltar National Party in 1991, the predecessor to the Liberal Party of Gibraltar. In 2003, he joined the Gibraltar Socialist Labour Party (GSLP) and was elected as a member of parliament (MP) for the GSLP in that year's general election.

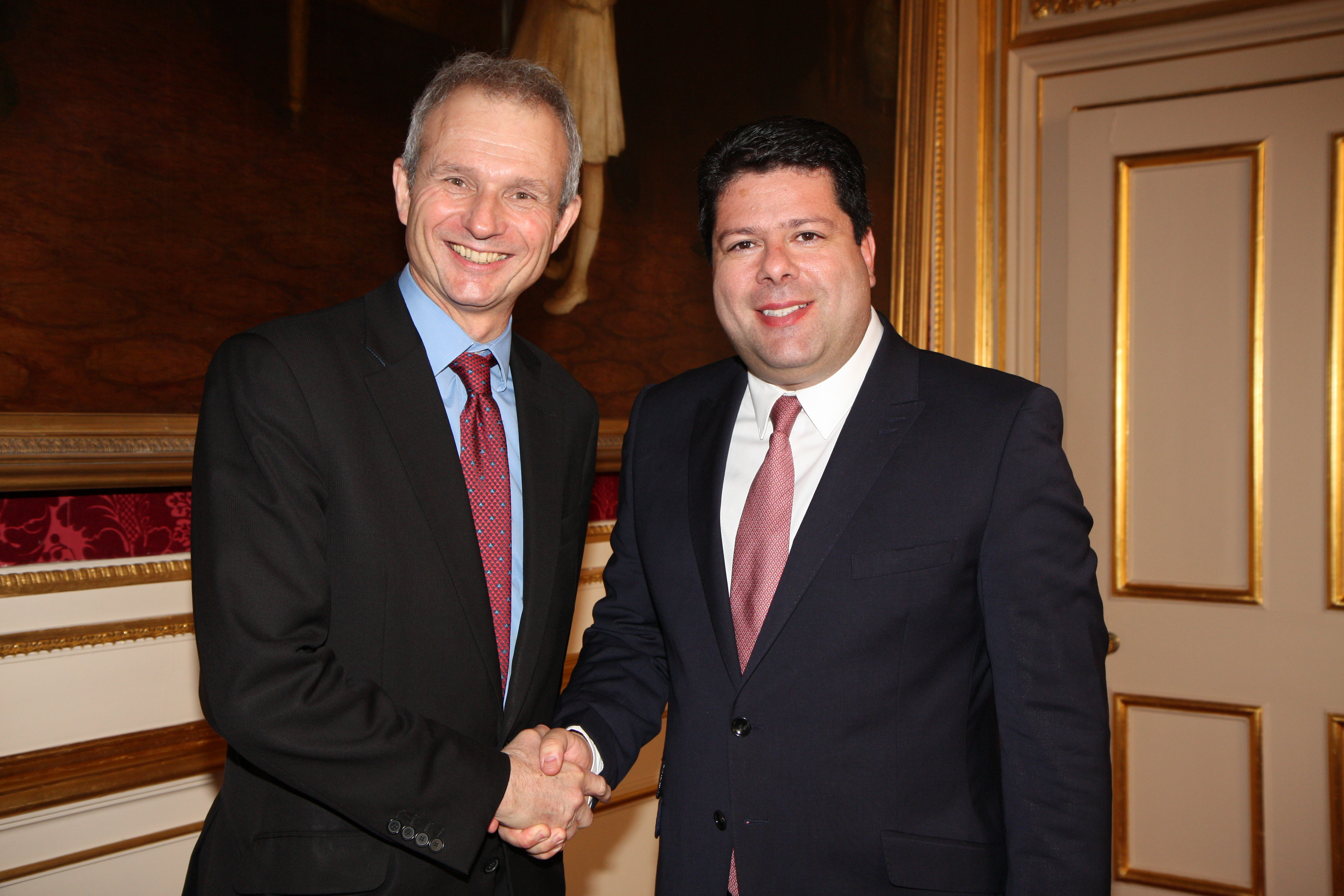
Picardo meets with Minister for Europe David Lidington in London on 2 December 2015.

Picardo has described what made him interested in politics as a lawyer in Gibraltar: "I started to wake up to politics and see what Hassan had done, and I started to understand what Joe Bossano was doing. I realised that if I had the ability to become a lawyer then I should use that ability also in the interests of Gibraltar. Gibraltar is a place where all of us have to pull our weight; we all have to do what we can and I wanted to do what I could in politics." Picardo became the leader of the Gibraltar Socialist Labour Party in 2011, taking over from Joe Bossano. He won the 2011 election, forming a coalition government with the Liberal Party.

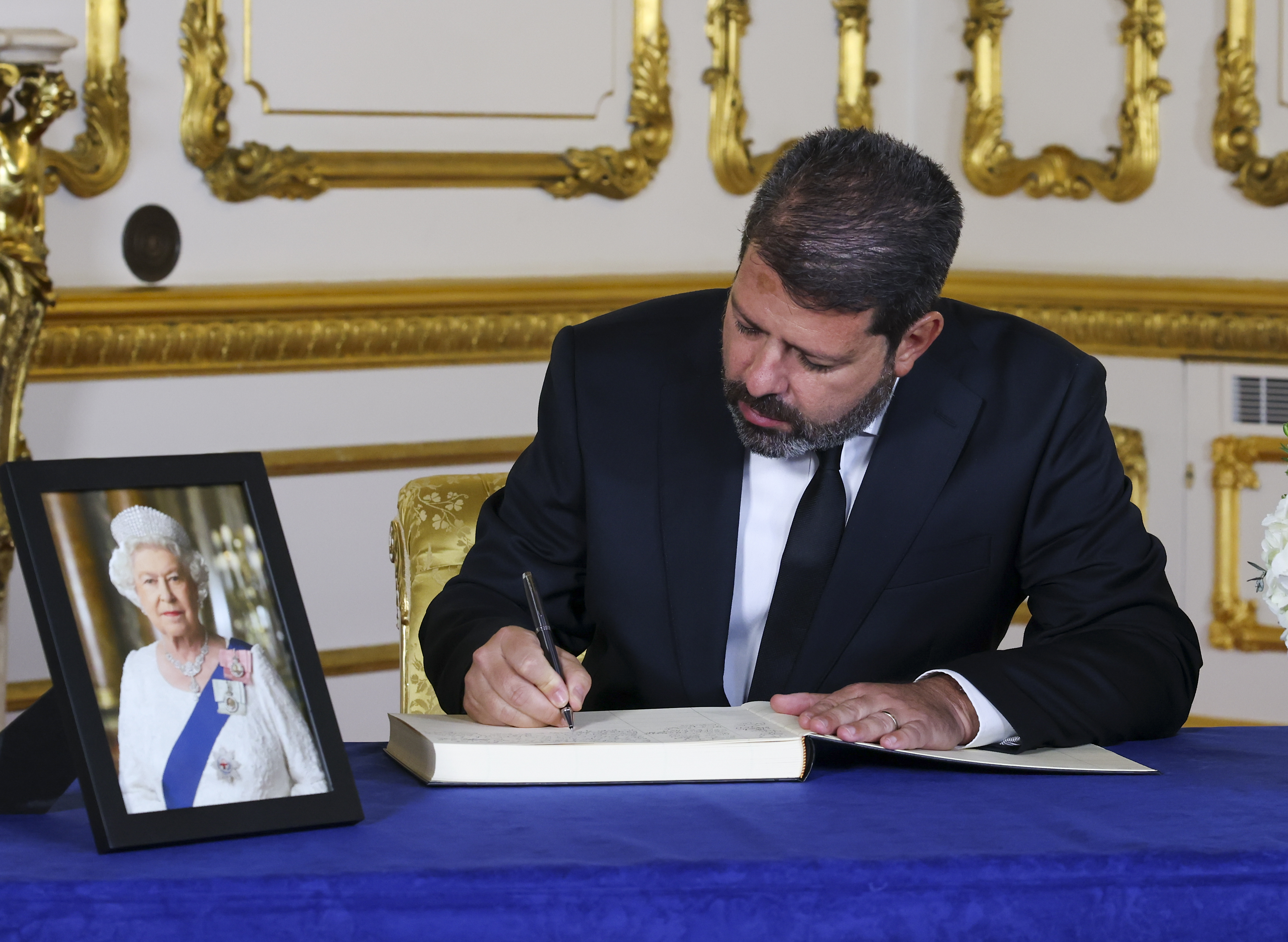
Picardo signing the book of condolence for Queen Elizabeth II at Lancaster House on 17 September 2022

Picardo said that the "crowning achievements" of his first term were two new schools, a university, a new bank, and a new 700-berth marina. He also appointed Gibraltar's first Minister for Equalities and passed the Civil Partnerships Act in 2014, ending legal discrimination against same-sex couples. In October 2015, he said that if Brexit took place, Gibraltar "would have to carefully reconsider what the economic prospects for Gibraltar are and how we would be positioned."

In the 2015 election, the GSLP-Liberal Alliance under Picardo won a second term in office, defeating the Gibraltar Social Democrats led by then Leader of the Opposition Daniel Feetham.

In the 2019 election, the GSLP-Liberal Alliance, once again under Picardo, won a third term in office, defeating both the Gibraltar Social Democrats led by Leader of the Opposition Keith Azopardi and Together Gibraltar led by Marlene Hassan-Nahon.

In the 2023 election, the GLSP-Liberal Alliance won a fourth term in office under the leadership of Picardo. It once again defeated Leader of the Opposition Keith Azopardi and the Gibraltar Social Democrats, but by a far narrower margin than 2019. The Alliance saw a 2.46pp decrease in its share of the popular vote and lost a seat to the GSD, resulting in a historic first for Gibraltar in which the Opposition held eight seats instead of the traditional seven.

During the election campaign, Picardo stated that the 2023 election would be his last, and he planned to step down as Chief Minister of Gibraltar and Leader of the Gibraltar Socialist Labour Party at some point during the 14th Parliament of Gibraltar. He also took the opportunity to suggest he would be in favour of Health Minister Gemma Arias Vasquez replacing him in both positions but noted that the party would ultimately select who succeeded him.

However, on 5 November 2024, he announced he would remain as Party Leader for the next general election, subject to an uncontested AGM the week after.

In June 2026, Picardo defended against accusations of betraying British sovereignty by inviting Spanish border control to oversee entry to Gibraltar. According to the EU–UK Agreement in respect of Gibraltar, freedom of movement is to be restored between Gibraltar and Spain on land. Arrivals by air and sea will be subject to the usual checks by Gibraltarian officers followed by Schengen border control. In practice, British citizens entering Gibraltar needs to seek Spanish permission; they could be refused entry into the British overseas territory by non-British authorities.

== McGrail Inquiry ==
In November 2025, the report of the McGrail Inquiry, chaired by retired UK High Court Judge Sir Peter Openshaw, was published examining the circumstances surrounding the early retirement of Police Commissioner Ian McGrail in June 2020.

The inquiry found that Picardo's summoning of McGrail to his office on 12 May 2020, following a police search warrant being executed at Hassans law firm targeting senior partner James Levy, was "a grossly improper attempt to interfere in a legitimate police investigation". The report concluded that Picardo "deliberately and cynically" misled the Gibraltar Police Authority about his reasons for wanting McGrail removed, concealing that his real grievance related to the police investigation into Levy, his "life-time friend and mentor". Sir Peter Openshaw stated that the "inevitable and irresistible conclusion" was that Picardo was using the GPA's processes to bring about McGrail's dismissal "for reasons of his own, relating to the police investigation into Mr Levy, whilst managing the process so as to give the appearance that he was being asked to retire for other reasons".

The inquiry also found there was no evidence of actual interference with the police investigation, and that Picardo genuinely believed McGrail had lied to him. Picardo stated the report "completely exonerates" the government, while acknowledging some criticisms were "sharp and highly critical" and indicating he was considering legal challenges to certain findings.

== Personal life ==
Picardo was married to Justine Olivero from 2011 until they separated in 2023 (before 2011 and 2023 elections respectively). She also works for Hassans law firm, and together they had two sons and one daughter, Sebastian, Oliver and Valentina. From 2023, he started dating Anna Bosce, local interior designer, wedding planner and psychology student. They eventually got married in a private ceremony on 10 October 2026, with the ceremony officiated by Karen Ramagge Prescott, Speaker of the Gibraltar Parliament.

Party political offices
Preceded by Joe Bossano	Leader of the Gibraltar Socialist Labour Party; 2011–present	Incumbent
Political offices
Preceded by Peter Caruana	Chief Minister of Gibraltar; 2011–present	Incumbent
