= Recognition of same-sex unions by country =

The recognition of same-sex unions varies by country.

== Same-sex marriage ==
=== Argentina ===
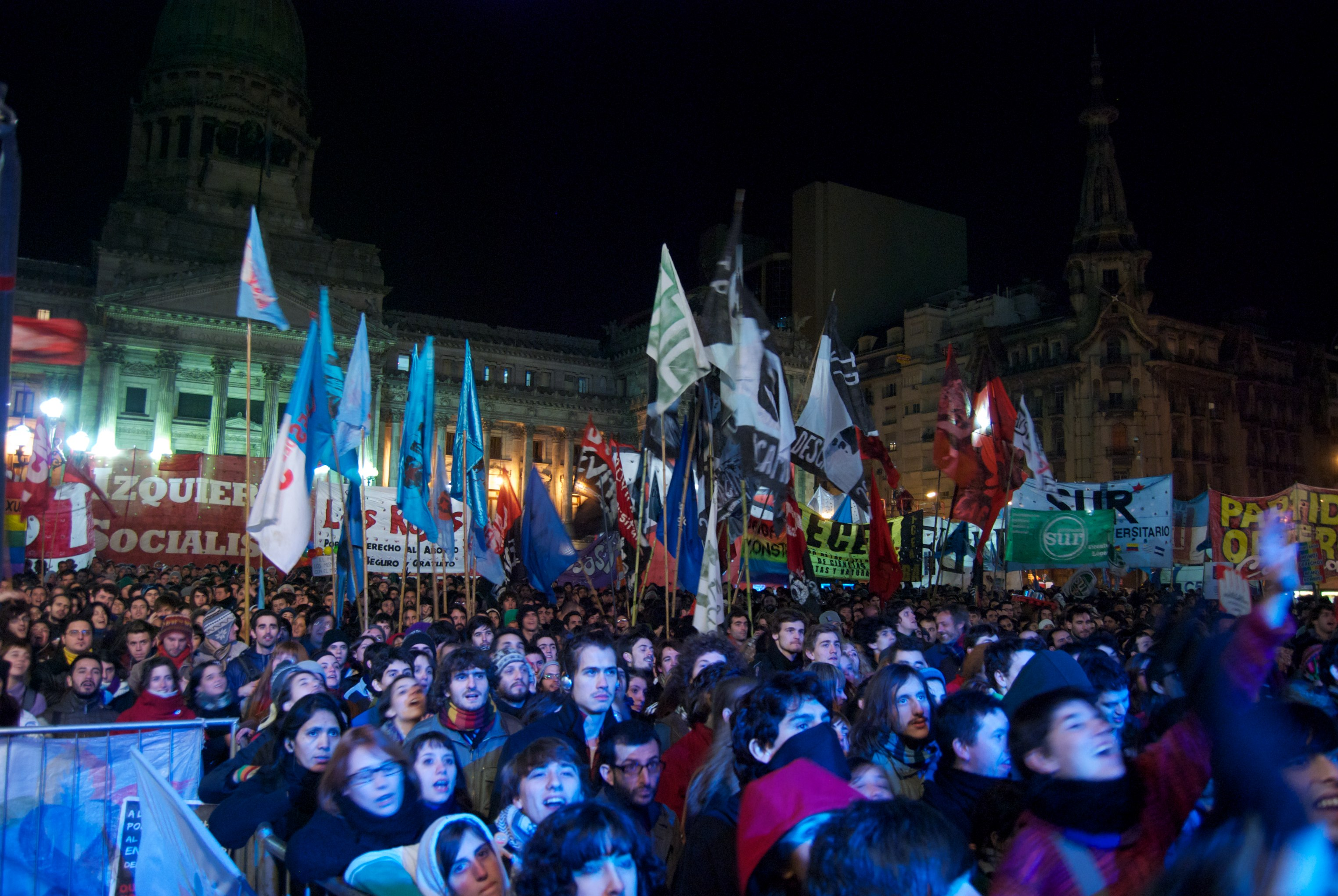
Crowd in support of same-sex marriage in Buenos Aires

On 15 July 2010, the Argentine Senate approved a bill extending marriage rights to same-sex couples. The law came into effect on 22 July 2010 upon promulgation by the Argentine President. Argentina thus became the first country in Latin America and the tenth in the world to legally recognize same-sex marriage. Polls showed that nearly 70% of Argentines supported giving gay people the same marital rights as heterosexuals.

=== Australia ===
Australia became the second nation in Oceania to legally recognize same-sex marriage when the Australian Parliament passed a bill on 7 December 2017. The bill received royal assent on 8 December, and took effect on 9 December 2017. The law removed the ban on same-sex marriage that previously existed and followed a voluntary postal survey held from 12 September to 7 November 2017, which returned a 61.6% Yes vote for same-sex marriage. The same legislation provided for same-sex marriage in all of Australia's external territories.

=== Austria ===
Since 1 January 2010, same-sex couples have been allowed to enter registered partnerships (Eingetragene Partnerschaft).

In December 2015, the Vienna Administrative Court dismissed a case challenging the same-sex marriage ban. The plaintiffs appealed to the Constitutional Court, which struck down the ban on same-sex marriage as unconstitutional on 5 December 2017, with effect from 1 January 2019. The Court also decided that civil unions will be open for both same-sex and different-sex couples from that date onwards.

=== Belgium ===
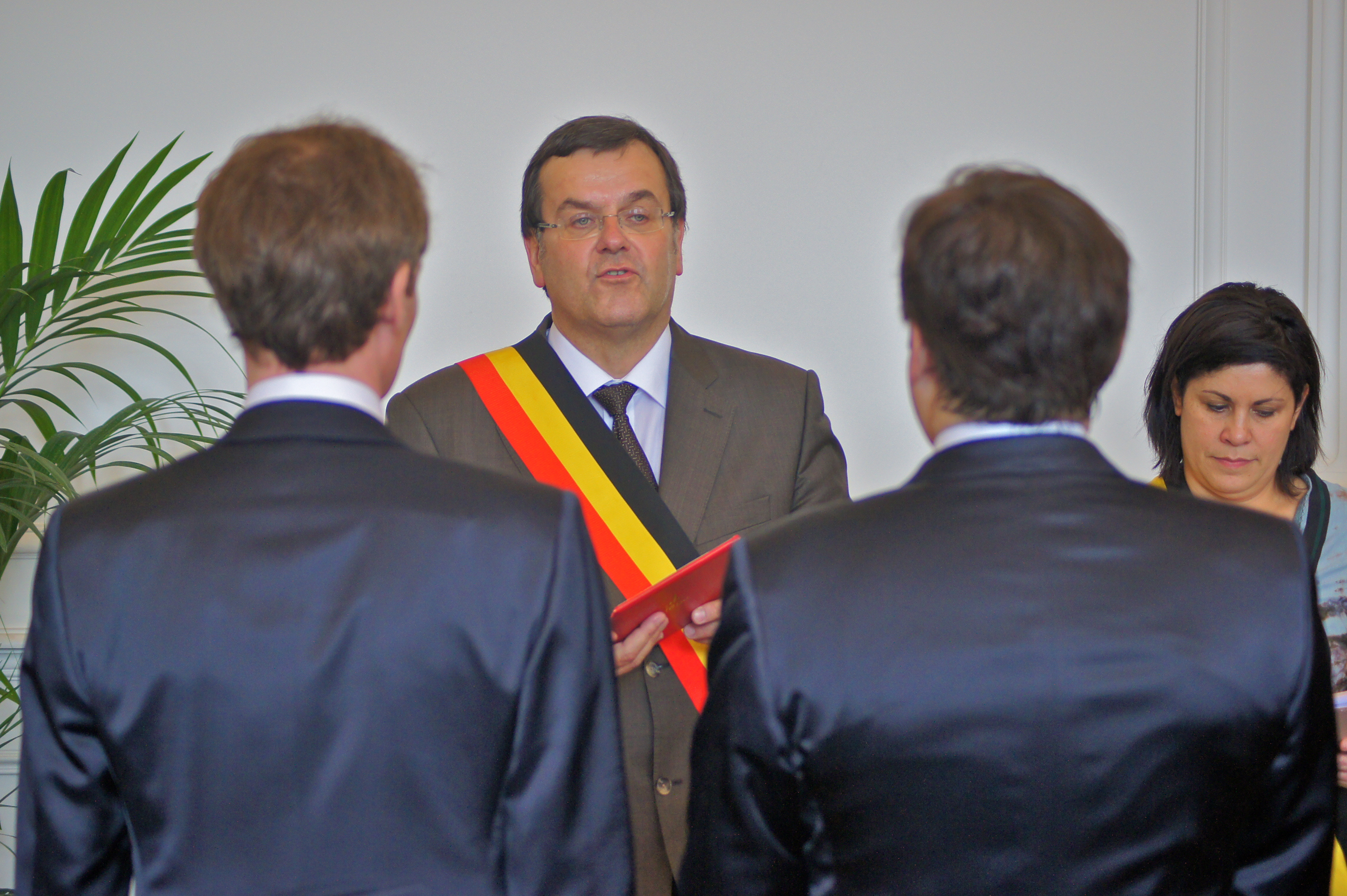
The Mayor of Liège, Willy Demeyer, officiating at the wedding of a gay couple

Belgium became the second country in the world to legally recognize same-sex marriages when a bill passed by the Belgian Federal Parliament took effect on 1 June 2003. Originally, Belgium allowed the marriages of foreign same-sex couples only if their country of origin also allowed these unions, however legislation enacted in October 2004 permits any couple to marry if at least one of the spouses has lived in the country for a minimum of three months. A 2006 statute legalized adoption by same-sex spouses.

=== Brazil ===
Recognition of same-sex unions in South America Marriage Other type of partnership Unrecognized Constitution limits marriage to opposite-sex couples Same-sex sexual activity illegal, though penalties not enforced

On 14 May 2013, the Justice's National Council of Brazil legally recognized same-sex marriage in the entire country in a 14–1 vote by issuing a ruling that orders all civil registers of the country to perform same-sex marriages and convert any existing civil union into a marriage, if the couple wish so. The ruling was published on 15 May and took effect on 16 May 2013. Brazil's Supreme Court ruled in May 2011 that same-sex couples are legally entitled to legal recognition of stable unions (known as união estável), one of the two possible family entities in Brazilian legislation. It includes almost all of the rights available to married couples in Brazil.

Between mid-2011 and May 2013, same-sex couples had their cohabitation issues converted into marriages in several Brazil states with the approval of a state judge. All legal Brazilian marriages were always recognized all over Brazil. This decision paved the way for future legislation on same-sex matrimonial rights. Before the nationwide legislation, the states of Alagoas, Bahia, Ceará, Espírito Santo, the Federal District, Mato Grosso do Sul, Paraíba, Paraná, Piauí, Rondônia, Santa Catarina, São Paulo, and Sergipe, as well as the city of Santa Rita do Sapucaí (MG), had already allowed same-sex marriages and several unions were converted into full marriages by state judges. In Rio de Janeiro, same-sex couples could also marry but only if local judges agreed with their request.

=== Canada ===
Legal recognition of same-sex marriage in Canada followed a series of constitutional challenges based on the equality provisions of the Canadian Charter of Rights and Freedoms. In the first such case, Halpern v. Canada (Attorney General), same-sex marriage ceremonies performed in Ontario on 14 January 2001 were subsequently validated when the common law, mixed-sex definition of marriage was held to be unconstitutional. Similar rulings had already legally recognized same-sex marriage in eight provinces and one territory when the 2005 Civil Marriage Act defined marriage throughout Canada as "the lawful union of two persons to the exclusion of all others".

=== Chile ===
Same-sex marriage and adoption for same-sex couples became legal in Chile on March 10, 2022, following passage of a law allowing it in December 2021.

On 10 December 2014, a group of senators from various parties, joined LGBT rights group MOVILH (Homosexual Movement of Integration and Liberation) in presenting a bill to allow same-sex marriage and adoption to Congress. MOVILH had been in talks with the Chilean Government to seek an amiable solution to the pending marriage lawsuit brought against the state before the Inter-American Court of Human Rights. On 17 February 2015, lawyers representing the Government and MOVILH met to discuss an amicable solution to the same-sex marriage lawsuit. The Government announced that they would drop their opposition to same-sex marriage. A formal agreement between the two parties and the Inter-American Commission of Human Rights was signed in April 2015. On 28 January 2015, the National Congress approved a bill recognizing civil unions for same-sex and opposite-sex couples offering some of the rights of marriage. President Michelle Bachelet signed the bill on 14 April, and it came into effect on 22 October.

In September 2016, President Bachelet stated before a United Nations General Assembly panel that the Chilean Government would submit a same-sex marriage bill to Congress in the first half of 2017. A same-sex marriage bill was submitted in September 2017. Parliament began discussing the bill on 27 November 2017, but it failed to pass before March 2018, when a new Government was inaugurated. On 16 January 2020, the bill was approved in the Senate by a 22 to 16 vote, then headed to the constitutional committee. On 21 July 2021, the Senate approved the bill recognizing gay marriage by 28 votes to 14. The bill was then approved by the Chamber of Deputies on 23 November 2021 by 101 votes to 33. The bill was examined in a joint committee of the Senate and the Chamber of Deputies on 6 December 2021 to put together a compromise bill for final votes in the Chamber of Deputies and the Senate. On 7 December 2021, the National Congress of Chile finally approved the legislature, and it was signed into law the next day.

=== Colombia ===
In February 2007, a series of rulings by the Constitutional Court meant that same-sex couples could apply for all the rights that heterosexual couples have in de facto marital unions (uniones maritales de hecho). On 26 July 2011, the Constitutional Court of Colombia ordered the Congress to pass legislation giving same-sex couples similar rights to marriage by 20 June 2013. If such a law were not passed by then, same-sex couples would be granted these rights automatically. Congress failed to pass same-sex marriage legislation, but the civil registries did not begin issuing marriage licenses to same-sex couples after the deadline. On 24 July 2013, a civil court judge in Bogotá declared a same-sex couple legally married, after a ruling on 11 July 2013 accepting the petition. This was the first same-sex couple married in Colombia. On 28 April 2016, the legal uncertainty around same-sex unions was resolved when the Constitutional Court ruled that same-sex couples are allowed to enter into civil marriages in the country and that judges and notaries are barred from refusing to perform same-sex weddings.

=== Costa Rica ===
Homosexuality laws in Central America and the Caribbean Islands. Same-sex marriage Other type of partnership Unregistered cohabitation No recognition of same-sex couples Constitution limits marriage to opposite-sex couples Same-sex sexual activity illegal but law not enforced

On 10 February 2016, the Constitutional Court of Costa Rica announced it would hear a case seeking to legally recognize same-sex marriage in Costa Rica and declare the country's same-sex marriage ban unconstitutional.

In January 2018, the Inter-American Court of Human Rights (IACHR) issued an advisory opinion (AO 24/17) regarding issues related to sexual orientation and gender identity, stating that the American Convention on Human Rights includes the recognition of same-sex marriage, in a case brought by the government of Costa Rica.

In the 2018 Costa Rican general election, the IACHR advisory opinion on same-sex marriage became a prominent issue. Carlos Alvarado Quesada, who supports LGBT rights and favors the implementation of the ruling, won the election with 60.7% of the vote, defeating by wide margin Fabricio Alvarado, a vocal opponent of LGBT rights who was against the implementation of the ruling. On 8 August 2018, the Supreme Court of Costa Rica ruled that the prohibition of same-sex marriage in the Family Code is unconstitutional, giving Congress 18 months to reform the law or the prohibition will be automatically lifted. As the Congress did not act, same-sex marriage in Costa Rica became legal on 26 May 2020 in line with the court ruling.

=== Cuba ===
Same-sex marriage in Cuba has been legal since 27 September 2022, after a majority of voters approved the legalization of same-sex marriage at a referendum two days prior. In May 2019 the government announced plans to legalize same-sex marriage. A draft family code containing provisions allowing same-sex couples to marry and adopt was approved by the National Assembly of People's Power on 21 December 2021. The text was under public consultation until 6 June 2022, and was approved by the Assembly on 22 July 2022. The measure was approved by two-thirds of voters in a referendum held on 25 September 2022. President Miguel Díaz-Canel signed the new family code into law on 26 September, and it took effect upon publication in the Official Gazette the following day.

=== Denmark ===
On 25 May 1989, Denmark became the first country to legally recognize registered partnerships between same-sex couples. A registered partnership was the same as a civil marriage, but was not seen as marriage in the eyes of the church.

On 7 June 2012, the Folketing (Danish Parliament) approved new laws regarding same-sex civil and religious marriage. These laws permit same-sex couples to get married in the Church of Denmark. The bills received royal assent on 12 June and took effect on 15 June 2012.

On 26 May 2015, Greenland, one of two other constituent countries in the Realm of Denmark, unanimously passed a law recognizing same-sex marriage. The first same-sex couple to marry in Greenland married on 1 April 2016, the day the law went into effect.

On 29 April 2016, the Faroe Islands, the realm's other constituent country, passed a same-sex marriage bill. The law required ratification in the Danish Parliament, which provided it on 25 April 2017. The Faroese law allows civil marriages for same-sex couples and exempts the Church of the Faroe Islands from being required to officiate same-sex weddings. The law took effect on 1 July 2017.

Laws regarding same-sex partnerships in Europe¹ Marriage Civil union Limited domestic recognition (cohabitation) Unrecognized Constitution limits marriage to opposite-sex couples ¹ May include recent laws or court decisions that have not yet entered into effect.

=== Ecuador ===
In May 2018, the Ecuador Supreme Court ruled, in a lesbian parenting case, that the country should comply with the 2018 IACHR advisory opinion. In June 2018, two family judges ruled the country's same-sex marriage ban unconstitutional. However, the Civil Registry appealed the rulings, preventing their coming into force.

Same-sex marriage eventually took effect in Ecuador on 8 July 2019, following the Constitutional Court ruling which was made on 12 June 2019.

=== Estonia ===
Registered partnerships were legalized in Estonia in 2016. According to the amendments to Family law taken in June 2023, from 2024 partnerships were strengthened into same-sex marriages: any two adults may get partnered or married, if at least one of them residing in the country.

=== Finland ===
Same-sex Registered partnerships have been legal in Finland since 2002. In 2010, Minister of Justice Tuija Brax said her Ministry was preparing to amend the Marriage Act to allow same-sex marriage by 2012. A citizens' initiative was launched to put the issue before the Parliament of Finland. The campaign collected 166,000 signatures and the initiative was presented to the Parliament in December 2013. The bill passed the second and final vote by 101–90 on 12 December 2014. The law took effect on 1 March 2017.

=== France ===
Since November 1999, France has had a civil union scheme known as a civil solidarity pact that is open to both opposite-sex and same-sex couples. The French Government introduced a bill to legally recognize same-sex marriage, Bill 344, in the National Assembly on 17 November 2012. It received final approval in the National Assembly in a 331–225 vote on 23 April 2013. Law No.2013-404 grants same-sex couples living in France, including foreigners provided at least one of the partners has their domicile or residence in France, the legal right to get married. The law also allows the recognition in France of same-sex couples' marriages that occurred abroad before the bill's enactment. President François Hollande signed it into law on 18 May 2013.

=== Germany ===
Prior to the legalization of same-sex marriage, Germany was one of the first countries to legislate registered life partnerships (Eingetragene Lebenspartnerschaft) for same-sex couples, which provided most of the rights of marriage. The law came into effect on 1 August 2001, and the act was progressively amended on subsequent occasions to reflect court rulings expanding the rights of registered partners.

Same-sex marriage has been legal in Germany since 1 October 2017. A bill recognizing marriages and adoption rights for same-sex couples passed the Bundestag on 30 June 2017 after Chancellor Angela Merkel stated that she would allow her CDU/CSU parliamentarians a conscience vote on such legislation, shortly after it was made a requirement for any future coalition by the SPD, the Greens and FDP. The co-governing SPD consequently forced a vote on the issue together with the opposition parties. The bill was signed into law by German President Frank-Walter Steinmeier on 20 July and came into effect on 1 October 2017.

=== Greece ===
Legislation regarding same-sex marriage was introduced to the Hellenic parliament on 1 February 2024. On the 15 February, it passed in the parliament with 176 votes in favour, 76 opposed, 2 abstaining and 46 absent. On the 16th it was signed into law.

=== Iceland ===
Same-sex marriage was introduced in Iceland through legislation establishing a gender-neutral definition of marriage introduced by the Coalition Government of the Social Democratic Alliance and Left-Green Movement. The legislation was passed unanimously by the Icelandic Althing on 11 June 2010, and took effect on 27 June 2010, replacing an earlier system of registered partnerships for same-sex couples. Prime Minister Jóhanna Sigurðardóttir and her partner were among the first married same-sex couples in the country.

=== Ireland ===
Prior to the legalization of same-sex marriage, the Civil Partnership and Certain Rights and Obligations of Cohabitants Act 2010 allowed same sex couples to enter civil partnerships. The Act came into force on 1 January 2011 and gave same-sex couples rights and responsibilities similar to, but not equal to, those of civil marriage.

On 22 May 2015, Ireland held a referendum that proposed to add to the Irish Constitution: "marriage may be contracted in accordance with law by two persons without distinction as to their sex." The proposal was approved with 62% of voters supporting same-sex marriage. On 29 August 2015, Irish President Michael D. Higgins signed the result of the May referendum into law, which made Ireland the first country in the world to approve same-sex marriage at a nationwide referendum. Same-sex marriage became formally legally recognized in Ireland on 16 November 2015.

=== Liechtenstein ===
Same-sex marriage has been legal in Liechtenstein since 1 January 2025. The law had been passed in May of 2024 in a vote of 24 to 1 by the Landtag. Liechtenstein became the 22nd European country to legalise same-sex marriage.

=== Luxembourg ===
The Parliament approved a bill to legally recognize same-sex marriage on 18 June 2014. The law was published in the official gazette on 17 July and took effect on 1 January 2015. On 15 May 2015, Prime Minister Xavier Bettel married Gauthier Destenay, with whom he had been in a civil partnership since 2010. Luxembourg thus became the first country in the European Union to have a prime minister who is in a same-sex marriage, and the second one in Europe.

=== Malta ===
Malta has recognized same-sex unions since April 2014, following the enactment of the Civil Unions Act, first introduced in September 2013. It established civil unions with same rights, responsibilities, and obligations as marriage, including the right of joint adoption and recognition of foreign same-sex marriage. A bill to approve same-sex marriage was approved 66–1 by Parliament on 12 July 2017. Malta became the 14th country in Europe to legally recognize same-sex marriage.

=== Mexico ===

Same-sex marriage is legally recognized and performed throughout Mexico. The Congress of the state of Tamaulipas passed a same-sex marriage law on 26 October 2022; it was the final state to legalize same-sex marriage.

On 21 December 2009, the Legislative Assembly of Mexico City (formerly the Federal District of Mexico City) legally recognized same-sex marriages and adoption by same-sex couples. The law was enacted eight days later and became effective in early March 2010. On 10 August 2010, the Mexican Supreme Court ruled that while not every state must grant same-sex marriages, they must all recognize those performed where they are legal.

On 3 June 2015, the Supreme Court of Justice of the Nation released a "jurisprudential thesis" that found state-laws defining marriage as a union between a man and a woman unconstitutional. The ruling standardized court procedures across Mexico to authorize same-sex marriages. However, the process is still lengthy and more expensive than that for an opposite-sex marriage, as the ruling did not invalidate any state laws, meaning same-sex couples will be denied the right to wed and will have to turn to the courts for individual injunctions (Spanish: amparo). However, given the nature of the ruling, judges and courts throughout Mexico must approve any application for a same-sex marriage. The official release of the thesis was on 19 June 2015, which took effect on 22 June 2015. Since this ruling, a majority of states have begun allowing same-sex marriage, either through legislative change, administrative decisions, or under court orders.

=== Nepal ===
In November 2008, the Supreme Court of Nepal issued final judgment on matters related to LGBT rights, which included permitting same-sex couples to marry. Same-sex marriage and protection for sexual minorities were to be included in the new Nepalese Constitution required to be completed by 31 May 2012. However, the Legislature was unable to agree on the Constitution before the deadline and was dissolved after the Supreme Court ruled that the term could not be extended. The Nepali Constitution was enacted in September 2015, but does not address same-sex marriage.

In October 2016, the Ministry of Women, Children and Social Welfare constituted a committee for the purpose of preparing a draft bill to legally recognize same-sex marriage. In November 2023, the first Nepali same-sex wedding occurred after the Supreme Court of Nepal's ruling to allow LGBT marriages in June 2023.

=== Netherlands ===
The Netherlands was the first country to extend marriage laws to include same-sex couples, following the recommendation of a special commission appointed to investigate the issue in 1995. A same-sex marriage bill passed the House of Representatives and the Senate in 2000, taking effect on 1 April 2001.

In the Dutch Caribbean special municipalities of Bonaire, Sint Eustatius and Saba, marriage is open to same-sex couples. A law enabling same-sex couples to marry in these municipalities passed and came into effect on 10 October 2012. The Caribbean countries Aruba, Curaçao and Sint Maarten, forming the remainder of the Kingdom of the Netherlands, do not perform same-sex marriages, but must recognize those performed in the Netherlands proper. Registered partnerships have been available in Aruba since September 2021. A same-sex marriage bill is under consideration in the Parliament of Curaçao.

=== New Zealand ===
Recognition of same-sex relationships in Oceania Marriage Marriages performed elsewhere are recognized (American Samoa) No recognition of same-sex couples Constitution limits marriage to opposite-sex couples (Palau, Tuvalu) Same-sex sexual activity illegal, but criminalisation not enforced Same-sex sexual activity illegal (Country names will appear with mouse-overs when map is viewed at full size. Encircling lines are the exclusive economic zones of each state.)

On 14 May 2012, Labour Party MP Louisa Wall stated that she would introduce a member's bill, the Marriage (Definition of Marriage) Amendment Bill, allowing same-sex couples to marry. The bill was drawn from the ballot and passed the first and second readings on 29 August 2012 and 13 March 2013, respectively. The bill received royal assent from the Governor-General on 19 April and took effect on 19 August 2013.

New Zealand marriage law only applies to New Zealand proper and the Ross Dependency in Antarctica. New Zealand's dependent territory, Tokelau, and associated states, Cook Islands and Niue, have their own marriage laws and do not perform or recognize same-sex marriage.

=== Norway ===
Same-sex marriage became legal in Norway on 1 January 2009 when a gender-neutral marriage bill came into effect after being passed by the Norwegian legislature, the Storting, in June 2008. Norway became the first Scandinavian country and the sixth country in the world to legally recognize same-sex marriage.

=== Portugal ===
Portugal created de facto unions similar to common-law marriage for cohabiting opposite-sex partners in 1999, and extended these unions to same-sex couples in 2001. However, the 2001 extension did not allow for same-sex adoption, either jointly or of stepchildren. On 11 February 2010, Parliament approved a bill recognizing same-sex marriage. The Portuguese President promulgated the law on 8 April 2010 and the law was effective on 5 June 2010, making Portugal the eighth country to legally recognize nationwide same-sex marriage; however, adoption was still denied for same-sex couples. In December 2015, the Portuguese Parliament approved a bill to allow adoption rights for same-sex couples.

=== Slovenia ===
Same-sex marriage in Slovenia has been legal since 9 July 2022 in accordance with a ruling from the Constitutional Court of Slovenia.

On 3 March 2015, the Assembly passed the bill to legalize same-sex marriage in a 51–28 vote. Opponents of the bill launched a petition for a referendum and managed to collect 40,000 signatures. The referendum was held on 20 December 2015 and 63.4% of the voters voted against the law, rendering Parliament's same-sex marriage act invalid.

On 16 June 2022, the Constitutional Court ruled 6–3 that the heterosexual definition of marriage was inconsistent with the Constitution of Slovenia's requirement for equal treatment. The court ordered the Slovenian Parliament to bring legislation in line within six months, although the ruling took effect immediately.

The National Assembly passed the bill on 4 October 2022 in a 48–29 vote. On 11 October 2022, the bill was given a suspensory veto by the National Council by a vote of 17 to 11, requiring another vote in the National Assembly. That same day, opponents of the bill submitted some 30,600 signatures to the National Assembly to start the process of a conducting a referendum on the vetoed legislation. On 18 October 2022, the National Assembly passed the bill by a final vote of 51–24. The bill was signed into law by President Borut Pahor, and published in the Official Gazette of the Republic of Slovenia on 28 October. That same day, the National Assembly approved a resolution by 45 votes to 27 with 2 abstentions, deeming a proposed referendum on changes to the Family Code inadmissible.

=== South Africa ===
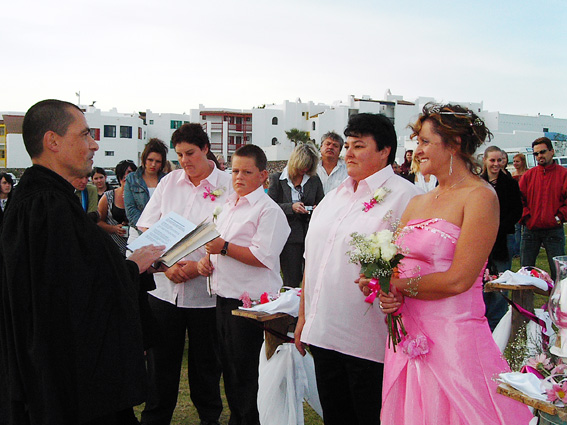
Same-sex wedding in South Africa, 2007

Legal recognition of same-sex marriages in South Africa came about as a result of the Constitutional Court's decision in the case of Minister of Home Affairs v Fourie. The court ruled on 1 December 2005 that the existing marriage laws violated the equality clause of the Bill of Rights because they discriminated on the basis of sexual orientation. The court gave Parliament one year to rectify the inequality.

The Civil Union Act was passed by the National Assembly on 14 November 2006, by a vote of 230 to 41. It became law on 30 November 2006. South Africa became the fifth country, the first in Africa, and the second outside Europe, to legally recognize same-sex marriage.

=== Spain ===
Spain was the third country in the world to legally recognize same-sex marriage on 3 July 2005.

In 2004, the nation's newly elected Socialist Government, led by President José Luis Rodríguez Zapatero, began a campaign for its legalization, including the right of adoption by same-sex couples. After much debate, the law permitting same-sex marriage was passed by the Cortes Generales (Spain's bicameral Parliament) on 30 June 2005. King Juan Carlos signed it on 1 July 2005.

=== Sweden ===
Same-sex marriage in Sweden has been legal since 1 May 2009, following the adoption of a new gender-neutral law on marriage by the Swedish Parliament on 1 April 2009, making Sweden the seventh country in the world to open marriage to same-sex couples nationwide. Marriage replaced Sweden's registered partnerships for same-sex couples. Existing registered partnerships between same-sex couples remained in force with an option to convert them into marriages. Same-sex marriages have been performed by the Church of Sweden since 2009.

=== Switzerland ===
Switzerland has allowed registered partnerships for same-sex couples since 1 January 2007, after a 2005 referendum. Legislation to allow same-sex marriage was introduced in 2013, passed on 18 December 2020 by the Swiss Parliament, and was adopted in a referendum on 26 September 2021. 64.1% of voters supported an amendment to the civil code that allowed same-sex marriage, adoption by same-sex couples and assisted reproductive technology for female same-sex couples. Switzerland voted and approved the amendment in September 2021, legally recognizing same-sex marriage. It will come into effect on 1 July 2022.

=== Taiwan ===
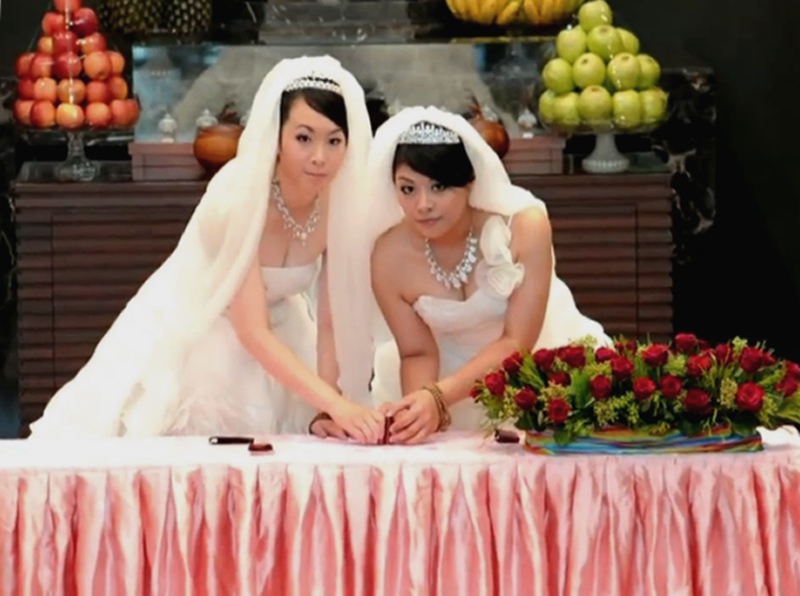
Buddhist same-sex marriage in Taiwan

Taiwan is the first country in Asia where same-sex marriage is legal. On 24 May 2017, the Constitutional Court ruled that same-sex couples have the right to marry, and gave the Taiwanese Government two years to amend the law to that effect. It was also ruled that if the law was not amended after two years, same-sex couples would automatically be able to register valid marriage applications in Taiwan. On 17 May 2019, lawmakers in Taiwan approved a bill legally recognizing same-sex marriage. The bill was signed by the President Tsai Ing-Wen on 22 May and came into effect on 24 May 2019.

=== Thailand ===
Thailand is the second country in Asia, and the first in South East Asia, where same-sex marriage is legal. On 23 January 2025, same-sex marriage came into effect in Thailand.

=== United Kingdom ===
Recognition of same-sex unions in the Lesser Antilles and Puerto Rico Same-sex marriage Unregistered cohabitation Island subject to IACHR advisory opinion No recognition of same-sex couples Constitutional ban on same-sex marriage Same-sex sexual activity illegal but penalties not enforced

Same-sex marriage is legal in all parts of the United Kingdom. As marriage is a devolved legislative matter, different parts of the UK enacted same-sex marriage at different times:

- Legislation to allow same-sex marriage in England and Wales was passed by the Parliament of the United Kingdom in July 2013 and took effect on 13 March 2014. The first same-sex marriages took place on 29 March 2014.
- Legislation to allow same-sex marriage in Scotland was passed by the Scottish Parliament in February 2014 and took effect on 16 December 2014. The first same-sex marriage ceremonies for same-sex couples previously in civil partnerships occurred on 16 December. The first same-sex marriage ceremonies for couples not in civil partnerships occurred on 31 December 2014.
- Legislation to allow same-sex marriage in Northern Ireland was passed by the Parliament of the United Kingdom (as the Northern Ireland Assembly was suspended) in July 2019 and took effect on 13 January 2020. The first same-sex marriage ceremony took place on 11 February 2020.

Same-sex marriage is legal in nine of the fourteen British Overseas Territories. It has been recognized in South Georgia and the South Sandwich Islands since 2014, Akrotiri and Dhekelia and the British Indian Ocean Territory (for UK military personnel only) since 3 June 2014, the Pitcairn Islands since 14 May 2015, the British Antarctic Territory since 13 October 2016, Gibraltar since 15 December 2016, the Falkland Islands since 29 April 2017, Saint Helena, Ascension and Tristan da Cunha since 20 December 2017, and Bermuda since 23 November 2018. Civil partnerships were enacted in the Cayman Islands on 4 September 2020. An appeal by the government of Bermuda of a lower court's ruling for same-sex marriage is pending as of October 2021.

Same-sex marriage is legal in the Crown dependencies. It has been recognized and performed in the Isle of Man since 22 July 2016, in Jersey since 1 July 2018, and in the Bailiwick of Guernsey at different times: in the jurisdiction of Guernsey since 2 May 2017, in Alderney since 14 June 2018, and in Sark since 23 April 2020.

=== United States ===
Status of same-sex marriage in the United States Performed and recognized Recognized when performed elsewhere Recognized by state and federal governments, but not by tribal government (mixed jurisdiction; not performed by tribal government) (mixed jurisdiction; not performed or recognized by tribal government)

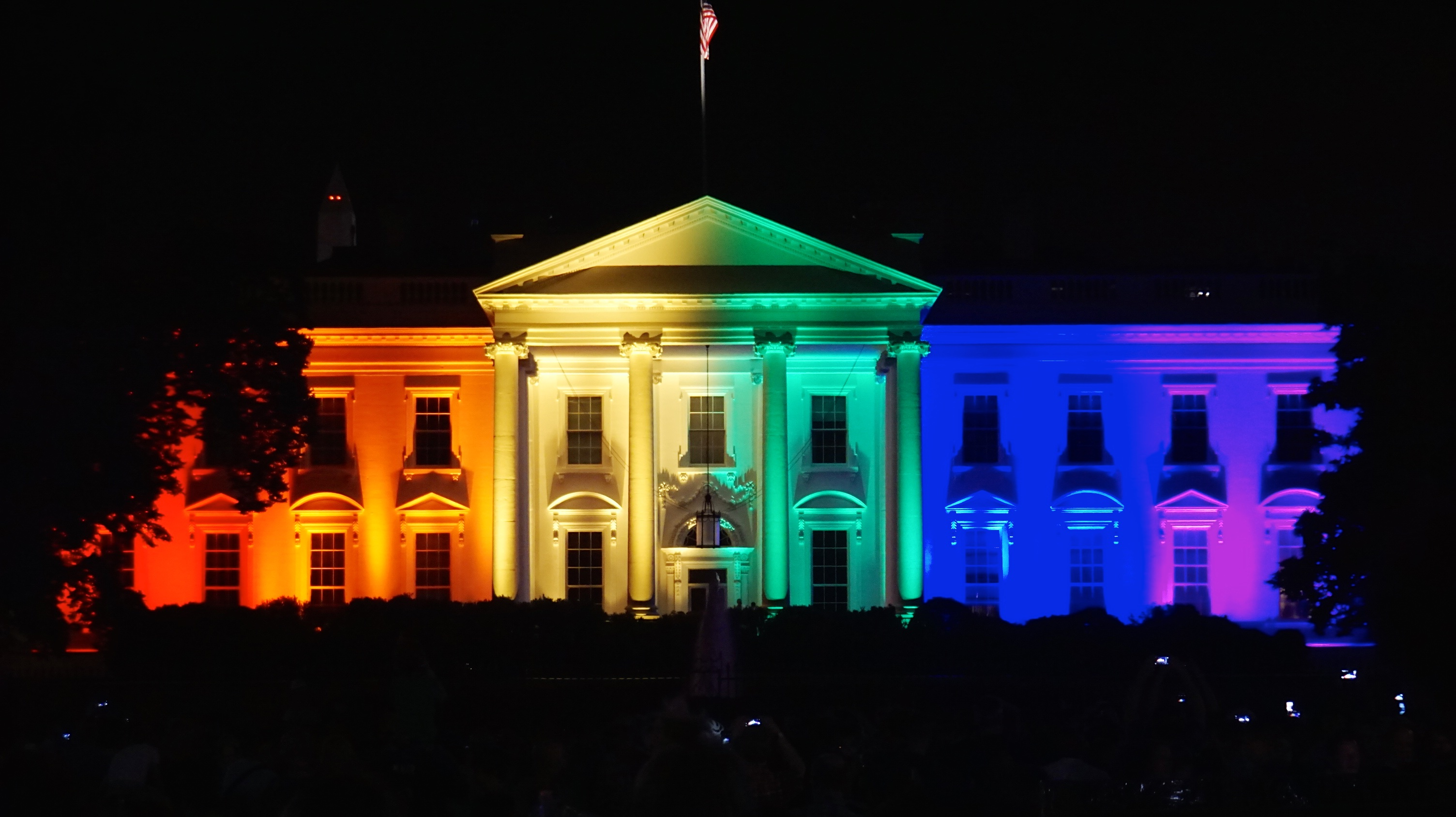
The White House, illuminated in rainbow colors, on the evening of the Obergefell ruling, 26 June 2015

Same-sex marriage in the United States expanded from one state in 2004 to all fifty states in 2015 through various state court rulings, state legislation, direct popular votes, and federal court rulings. The fifty states each have separate marriage laws, which must adhere to rulings by the Supreme Court of the United States that recognize marriage as a fundamental right that is guaranteed by both the Due Process Clause and the Equal Protection Clause of the Fourteenth Amendment to the United States Constitution, as first established in the 1967 landmark civil rights case of Loving v. Virginia.

Civil rights campaigning in support of marriage without distinction as to sex or sexual orientation began in the 1970s. In 1972, the now overturned Baker v. Nelson saw the Supreme Court of the United States decline to become involved. The issue became prominent from around 1993, when the Supreme Court of Hawaii ruled in Baehr v. Lewin that it was unconstitutional under the state constitution for the state to abridge marriage on the basis of sex. That ruling led to federal and state actions to explicitly abridge marriage on the basis of sex in order to prevent the marriages of same-sex couples from being recognized by law, the most prominent of which was the 1996 federal DOMA. In 2003, the Massachusetts Supreme Judicial Court ruled in Goodridge v. Department of Public Health that it was unconstitutional under the state constitution for the state to abridge marriage on the basis of sex. From 2004 through to 2015, as the tide of public opinion continued to move towards support of same-sex marriage, various state court rulings, state legislation, direct popular votes (referendums and initiatives), and federal court rulings established same-sex marriage in thirty-six of the fifty states.

In May 2011, national public support for same-sex marriage rose above 50% for the first time. In June 2013, the Supreme Court of the United States struck down DOMA for violating the Fifth Amendment to the United States Constitution in the landmark civil rights case of United States v. Windsor, leading to federal recognition of same-sex marriage, with federal benefits for married couples connected to either the state of residence or the state in which the marriage was solemnized. In June 2015, the Supreme Court ruled in the landmark civil rights case of Obergefell v. Hodges that the fundamental right of same-sex couples to marry on the same terms and conditions as opposite-sex couples, with all the accompanying rights and responsibilities, is guaranteed by both the Due Process Clause and the Equal Protection Clause of the Fourteenth Amendment to the United States Constitution.

Same-sex marriage is also legal in four of the United States territories: Puerto Rico, US Virgin Islands, Guam, and the Northern Mariana Islands. It is not legal in American Samoa, amid legal uncertainty over whether the US Constitution applies there in full.

Native American Tribal Nations also have their own same-sex marriage legislation.

The United States of America is the most populous country in the world to have established same-sex marriage nationwide.

=== Uruguay ===
Uruguay's Chamber of Deputies passed a bill on 12 December 2012, to extend marriage rights to same-sex couples. The Senate passed the bill on 2 April 2013, but with minor amendments. On 10 April 2013, the Chamber of Deputies passed the amended bill by a two-thirds majority (71–22). The president promulgated the law on 3 May 2013 and it took effect on 5 August.

== Other countries ==
=== Czech Republic ===
Before the October 2017 election, LGBT activists started a public campaign with the aim of achieving same-sex marriage within the next four years.

Prime Minister Andrej Babiš supports the legalization of same-sex marriage. A bill to legally recognize same-sex marriage was introduced to the Czech Parliament in June 2018. Recent opinion polls have shown that the bill is quite popular in the Czech Republic; a 2018 poll found that 75% of Czechs favored legal recognition of same-sex marriage.

=== El Salvador ===
In August 2016, a lawyer in El Salvador filed a lawsuit before the country's Supreme Court asking for the nullification of Article 11 of the Family Code, which defines marriage as a heterosexual union. Labeling the law as discriminatory and explaining the lack of gendered terms used in Article 34 of the Constitution's summary of marriage, the lawsuit sought to allow same-sex couples the right to wed. On 20 December, the Salvadoran Supreme Court rejected the lawsuit on a legal technicality.

A second lawsuit against the same-sex marriage ban was filed on 11 November 2016. On 17 January 2019, the Supreme Court dismissed the case on procedural grounds.

The 2018 Inter-American Court of Human Rights advisory opinion regarding the legalization of same-sex marriage in countries that have ratified the American Convention on Human Rights applies to El Salvador.

=== Italy ===
The cities of Bologna, Naples and Fano began recognizing same-sex marriages from other jurisdictions in July 2014, followed by Empoli, Pordenone, Udine and Trieste in September, and Florence, Piombino, Milan and Rome in October, and by Bagheria in November. The Italian Council of State annulled these marriages in October 2015.

A January 2013 Datamonitor poll found that 54.1% of respondents were in favor of same-sex marriage. A May 2013 Ipsos poll found that 42% of Italians supported allowing same-sex couples to marry and adopt children. An October 2014 Demos poll found that 55% of respondents were in favor of same-sex marriage, with 42% against. A Pew Research Center survey showed that 59% of Italians were in favor of legal recognition of same-sex marriage.

On 25 February 2016, the Italian Senate passed a bill allowing civil unions with 173 senators in favor and 73 against. That same bill was approved by the Chamber of Deputies on 11 May 2016 with 372 deputies in favor and 51 against. The President of Italy signed the bill into law on 22 May 2016 and the law went into effect on 5 June 2016.

On 31 January 2017, the Italian Supreme Court of Cassation ruled that same-sex marriages performed abroad can be fully recognized by court order, when at least one of the two spouses is a citizen of a European Union country where same-sex marriage is legal.

=== Japan ===
Same-sex marriage is not legal in Japan. Article 24 of the Japanese Constitution states that "Marriage shall be based only on the mutual consent of both sexes and it shall be maintained through mutual cooperation with the equal rights of husband and wife as a basis." Article 24 was created to establish the equality of both sexes in marriage, in opposition to the pre-war legal situation whereby the husband/father was legally defined as the head of household and marriage require permission from the male head of the family. In 2021, the district court in Sapporo ruled that this wording requires recognition of same-sex marriage, with similar suits pending in other district courts. The Tokyo Metropolitan government will start a system that effectively allows same-sex marriage in Japan's capital from April 2022.

Since 2015, three prefectures and dozens of municipalities and have begun issuing partnership certificates to same-sex couples that offer limited rights when accessing civil services.

According to a 2021 opinion poll, 65% of Japanese people support same-sex marriage, with 22% opposing.

=== Panama ===
On 17 October 2016, a married same-sex couple filed an action of unconstitutionality seeking to recognize same-sex marriages performed abroad. In early November, the case was admitted to the Supreme Court. A challenge seeking to fully legally recognize same-sex marriage in Panama was introduced before the Supreme Court in March 2017. The Supreme Court heard arguments on both cases in summer 2017.

On 9 January 2018, the Inter-American Court of Human Rights issued an advisory opinion stating that parties to the American Convention on Human Rights should grant same-sex couples access to all existing domestic legal systems of family registration, including marriage, along with all rights that derive from marriage. On 16 January, the Panamanian Government welcomed the opinion. Then Vice President Isabel Saint Malo, speaking on behalf of the Government, announced that the country would fully abide by the opinion. Official notices, requiring compliance with the opinion, were sent out to various governmental departments that same day. In March 2023, the Supreme Court of Panama ruled that there is no right to same-sex marriage, despite a 2018 IACHR advisory opinion.

However under the presidency of the more socially conservative Laurentino Cortizo a constitutional reform was approved by the National Assembly of Panama to ban same-sex marriage by establishing in the Constitution that marriage is between a man and a woman. The reform had to be voted again in 2020 and then submitted to referendum.

=== Peru ===
In a ruling published on 9 January 2017, the 7th Constitutional Court of Lima ordered the RENIEC to recognize and register the marriage of a same-sex couple who had previously wed in Mexico City. RENIEC subsequently appealed the ruling.

On 14 February 2017, a bill legally recognizing same-sex marriage was introduced in the Peruvian Congress. The bill never reached Congress for debate in plenary session.

The 2018 Inter-American Court of Human Rights advisory opinion regarding the legalization of same-sex marriage in countries that have ratified the American Convention on Human Rights applies to Peru. On 11 January, the president of the Supreme Court of Peru stated that the Peruvian Government should abide by the IACHR opinion. On 29 January 2018, Housing Minister Carlos Bruce estimated that same-sex marriage will be allowed in Peru "within two years", and several former Supreme Court judges and lawmakers, including Indira Huilca, stated that same-sex marriage will be allowed in Peru "within two years, no matter what". In June 2022, the Supreme Court ruled that the country is not obliged to comply with the IACHR opinion.

After the 2021 general elections, deputies of the newly elected Congress from Together for Peru and We are Peru introduced a new bill to Congress legalizing same-sex marriages on 22 October 2021.

=== Philippines ===
Same-sex marriages and civil unions are currently not recognized by the state, the illegal insurgent Communist Party of the Philippines performs same-sex marriages in territories under its control since 2005.

In October 2016, Speaker of the House of Representatives of the Philippines Pantaleon Alvarez announced he will file a civil union bill in Congress. The bill was introduced to Congress in October of the following year under the wing of the House Speaker and three other congresspersons, including Geraldine Roman, the country's first duly-elected transgender lawmaker.

President Rodrigo Duterte supports the legalization of same-sex marriage.

On 19 June 2018, the Supreme Court of the Philippines heard oral arguments in a case seeking to legally recognize same-sex marriage in the Philippines. The court dismissed the case on 3 September 2019 due to "lack of standing" and "failing to raise an actual, justiciable controversy", additionally finding the plaintiff's legal team liable for indirect contempt of court for "using constitutional litigation for propaganda purposes".

=== South Korea ===
In July 2015, Kim Jho Kwang-soo and his partner, Kim Seung-Hwan, filed a lawsuit seeking legal status for their marriage after their marriage registration form was rejected by the local authorities in Seoul. On 25 May 2016, a South Korean district court ruled against the couple and argued that without clear legislation a same-sex union can not be recognized as a marriage. The couple quickly filed an appeal against the district court ruling. Their lawyer, Ryu Min-Hee, announced that two more same-sex couples had filed separate lawsuits in order to be allowed to wed.

In December 2016, a South Korean appeals court upheld the district court ruling. The couple vowed to bring the case to the Supreme Court of Korea.

In May 2019, Kim Gyu-Jin married her wife in a Manhattan marriage bureau, New York City to obtain a marriage registration. Then they had a factory wedding in Seoul in November. In May 2020, to celebrate the 1st wedding anniversary, Kim Gyu-Jin and her spouse filed a marriage registration with the Jongno-Gu Office but received the notice of non-repair. She interviewed her experiences including KBS, a Korean national broadcaster on prime time. Another is on the main news page of KakaoTalk, South Korea's leading messaging app. The article received about 10,000 comments, 80 percent of which were negative, she said. Some people told the couple to "Get out of Korea." Some replies were intensely malicious and threatening. After consulting a lawyer, and pushing the police to talk to portal sites, she sued the 100 most malicious commentators.

A 2017 poll found that 41% of South Koreans supported same-sex marriage, while 52% were opposed. Support is significantly higher among younger people, however, with a 2014 opinion poll showing that 60% of South Koreans in their 20s supported same-sex marriage, about double that of 2010 (30.5%).

=== Venezuela ===
In April 2016, the Supreme Court announced it would hear a lawsuit that seeks to declare Article 44 of the Civil Code unconstitutional for outlawing same-sex marriage.

Nicolás Maduro suggested that the National Assembly agree to legally recognize it in 2021.

=== Vietnam ===
In Vietnam, currently only a marriage between a man and a woman is recognized. Vietnam's Ministry of Justice began seeking advice on legalizing same-sex marriage from other governmental and non-governmental organizations in April and May 2012, and planned to further discuss the issue at the National Assembly in Spring 2013. However, in February 2013, the Ministry of Justice requested that the National Assembly avoid action until 2014.

The Vietnamese Government abolished an administrative fine imposed on same-sex weddings in 2013.

In June 2013, the National Assembly began formal debate on a proposal to establish legal recognition for same-sex marriage.

On 27 May 2014, the National Assembly's Committee for Social Affairs removed the provision giving legal status and some rights to cohabiting same-sex couples from the Government's bill to amend the Law on Marriage and Family. The bill was approved by the National Assembly on 19 June 2014.

On 1 January 2015, the 2014 Law on Marriage and Family officially went into effect. It states that while Vietnam allows same-sex weddings, it will not offer legal recognition or protection to unions between people of the same sex.
