= Same-sex marriage in Saint Helena, Ascension and Tristan da Cunha =

Same-sex marriage has been legal in Saint Helena, Ascension and Tristan da Cunha since 2017. An ordinance to open marriage to same-sex couples in Saint Helena was passed by the Legislative Council in a 9–2 vote on 19 December 2017. It went into force the following day, and the first same-sex marriage was performed on 31 December 2018. Same-sex couples have also been able to marry in Ascension Island since 1 January 2017 and in Tristan da Cunha since 4 August 2017.

Saint Helena, Ascension and Tristan da Cunha was the eighth British Overseas Territory to legalise same-sex marriage territorywide, following South Georgia and the South Sandwich Islands, Akrotiri and Dhekelia, the British Indian Ocean Territory, the Pitcairn Islands, the British Antarctic Territory, Gibraltar and the Falkland Islands.

== Background ==
The Kingdom of England took possession of Saint Helena in 1659, building a fort and several houses. It became a crown colony in 1834. Ascension Island was claimed by the United Kingdom in 1815, and the archipelago of Tristan da Cunha was annexed by the British the following year and governed as a dependency of the Cape Colony in South Africa. Ascension and Tristan became dependencies of Saint Helena in 1922 and 1938 respectively. In 2009, the three island groups were raised to equal status with the enactment of a new constitution.

A registry for marriages, burials and births was created upon the instructions of the East India Company in 1673. Until the middle of the 19th century, marriages were performed on simple payment of a fee. Civil marriages were possible, performed by the Governor of Saint Helena. The Marriage Ordinance 1851 was the first local ordinance documenting how marriages were to be legally solemnised on the islands. It required the intending spouses to provide an advance notice of marriage, and allowed the Anglican Church to perform religious marriage ceremonies. As non-Anglican churches became established over the years, they also obtained the right to marry people. The Marriage Ordinance 1851 did not explicitly ban same-sex marriages, and used gender-neutral language with regard to married spouses (referring to the "parties" to a marriage). Nonetheless, a marriage between persons of the same sex was void ab initio in common law, and thus same-sex couples were unable to marry on the islands. Explicit bans on same-sex marriages were enacted in England and Wales in the Nullity of Marriage Act 1971, and later the Matrimonial Causes Act 1973. Similar laws were passed in Scotland and Northern Ireland. These bans, since repealed, did not apply to Saint Helena, Ascension and Tristan da Cunha. In March 2014, same-sex marriage was legalised in England and Wales with the enactment of the Marriage (Same Sex Couples) Act 2013, but this law also does not apply to the territory. Amid pressure to permit same-sex marriages and reform other "outdated" sections—such as the fact that civil marriages could only be conducted at the Castle and not other venues—the government agreed in 2016 to draft a new marriage ordinance.

== Same-sex marriage laws ==
Same-sex sexual activity legal Same-sex marriage Limited recognition (foreign residency rights) No recognition of same-sex couples Same-sex sexual activity illegal Prison but not enforced Prison Death penalty on books but not enforced Enforced death penalty

Same-sex marriage has been legal in Ascension Island since 1 January 2017, in Tristan da Cunha since 4 August 2017, and in Saint Helena since 20 December 2017.

=== Ascension Island ===
The Marriage (Ascension) Ordinance 2016 permitting same-sex couples to marry was approved by the Ascension Island Council on 31 May 2016, in a unanimous 5–0 vote. It was signed by Governor Lisa Honan and published in the official gazette on 20 June. On 23 December 2016, Honan issued an order to commence the law on 1 January 2017.

Article 2 of the ordinance reads:

"marriage" includes a marriage between persons of the same sex

=== Tristan da Cunha ===
On 23 February 2017, after consultation with Governor Honan, the Tristan da Cunha Island Council agreed to adopt an ordinance to legalise same-sex marriage. On 4 August, the Marriage (Tristan da Cunha) Ordinance, 2017, extending the application of the Marriage (Ascension) Ordinance, 2016 to Tristan da Cunha, was signed by Governor Honan and published in the official gazette. It took effect upon publication.

=== Saint Helena ===
On 27 April 2016, the Saint Helena Executive Council announced it would hold a public consultation on a draft marriage ordinance, which, if approved, would allow same-sex couples to marry. The consultation lasted until 25 May, and the results revealed that a majority of respondents were in favour of same-sex marriage. On 15 November 2016, the Executive Council decided to allow a same-sex marriage bill to proceed to the Legislative Council, after the draft bill underwent a number of technical issues addressed by Attorney General Angelo Berbotto. On 12 December 2016, after a lengthy debate, the Legislative Council passed an amendment removing provisions allowing same-sex marriage from the bill, which eventually led to the entire bill being withdrawn.

In January 2017, a same-sex couple applied to marry in Saint Helena. The registrar was in the process of obtaining legal advice as to how to proceed (the existing Marriage Ordinance 1851 being unclear on same-sex marriage) when two members of the public filed caveats (objections) to the marriage notice. Subsequently, the registrar referred the issue to the Chief Justice of the Saint Helena Supreme Court for a decision. A preliminary hearing took place in the court on 23 February 2017. The parties in the case were given until July 2017 to submit their arguments.

At a meeting of the Legislative Council on 22 September 2017, members agreed to notify the Council as to their opinions on the subject at a later meeting. This would allow another same-sex marriage ordinance to be debated before the end of the year, and avoid a Supreme Court hearing on the issue, which was expected in January 2018. On 6 October 2017, the Legislative Council decided to conduct a series of public consultations throughout the month, consulting on two options: the introduction of same-sex marriage, or the introduction of civil partnerships, which critics argued would violate the Constitution's anti-discrimination provisions. A petition circulated by opponents of same-sex marriage was signed by only 5% of the resident population, "demonstrating that the vast majority were either in favour of [same-sex marriage], or at least not opposed to it". On 4 December, the Social and Community Development Committee, which conducted the consultations, recommended the Executive Council to approve the draft ordinance with one minor technical amendment, which the Executive Council did the following day. On 19 December, after a failed attempt to remove the same-sex marriage provisions, the ordinance was approved by the Legislative Council in a 9–2 vote. It received royal assent by Governor Honan, becoming the Marriage Ordinance 2017, and took effect upon publication on 20 December 2017.

19 December 2017 vote in the Legislative Council
| Electoral district | Voted for | Voted against | Abstained |
|---|---|---|---|
| Half Tree Hollow | 4: Clint Beard; Cruyff Buckley; Derek Thomas; Russel Yon | 1: Cyril Leo | – |
| Longwood | 2: Kylie Hercules; Christine Scipio-O'Dean | 1: Brian Isaac | – |
| Saint Paul's | 2: Gavin Ellick; Anthony Green | – | – |
| Alarm Forest | 1: Lawson Henry | – | – |
| Jamestown | – | – | 1: Corinda Essex |
| Total (Note: The Legislative Council consists of 12 voting members. The Speaker and Deputy Speaker, Eric Benjamin and John Cranfield, respectively, are non-voting members. In addition, Attorney General Angelo Berbotto is an ex officio member.) | 9 | 2 | 1 |
| Total | 75.0% | 16.7% | 8.3% |

The first same-sex marriage was performed on 31 December 2018 between Lemarc Thomas, a Saint Helenian, and his Swedish partner Michael Wernstedt at the Plantation House in Saint Paul's.

== Religious performance ==
The Anglican Church of Southern Africa does not permit same-sex marriages. Its marriage policies state that "holy matrimony is the lifelong and exclusive union between one man and one woman". In 2016, the synod voted against blessing same-sex unions. The decision split the Church, with several dioceses deciding to nonetheless proceed with the blessing of same-sex relationships, notably the Diocese of Saldanha Bay in South Africa. Archbishop Thabo Makgoba expressed disappointment with the decision not to bless same-sex unions, but added that "all is not lost", expressing hope that the matter would be debated again in the future. In early 2023, the Church once again refused to allow its clergy to bless same-sex unions, but directed the synod to develop "guidelines for providing pastoral ministry to those in same-sex relationships". In May 2024, Archbishop Makgoba released a document recommending prayers for same-sex couples, which the synod rejected in September 2024. In September 2026, the Church again rejected a motion relating to a proposed "ministry of inclusion" for parishioners in same-sex relationships.

The Anglican Diocese of Cape Town, which also covers Tristan da Cunha, passed a resolution in 2009 to give pastoral guidelines to same-sex couples who live in "covenanted relationships". The resolution agreed to affirm "a pastoral response to same-sex partnerships of faithful commitment in our parish families." The Diocese of St Helena does not possess a similar policy.

== See also ==
- LGBT rights in Saint Helena, Ascension and Tristan da Cunha
- Same-sex marriage in the United Kingdom
- Recognition of same-sex unions in the British Overseas Territories
