= Same-sex marriage in the Falkland Islands =

Same-sex marriage has been legal in the Falkland Islands since 29 April 2017. A law permitting same-sex couples to marry passed the Legislative Assembly by 7 votes to 1 on 30 March 2017. It was given royal assent by Governor Colin Roberts on 13 April, and went into effect on 29 April. The territory also recognises civil partnerships, which are open to both same-sex and different-sex couples.

The Falkland Islands was the seventh British Overseas Territory to legalise same-sex marriage territorywide, after South Georgia and the South Sandwich Islands, Akrotiri and Dhekelia, the British Indian Ocean Territory, the Pitcairn Islands, the British Antarctic Territory and Gibraltar.

== Background ==
Recognition of same-sex unions in South America Marriage Other type of partnership Unrecognized Constitution limits marriage to opposite-sex couples Same-sex sexual activity illegal, though penalties not enforced

First claimed by the Kingdom of Great Britain in 1765, the British reasserted its sovereignty over the Falkland Islands in 1833, and a civilian population was invited to stay on the islands. The United Kingdom began implementing laws in the islands and a formal government was formed in 1842. The Marriage Ordinance 1949, applying to both the Falkland Islands and South Georgia and the South Sandwich Islands, was enacted on 31 December 1949. The ordinance provided for the issuance of marriage licenses and empowered the Governor of the Falkland Islands to appoint registrars to conduct marriage ceremonies. The ordinance did not explicitly ban same-sex marriage, nor did it define the term "marriage". Nonetheless, a marriage between persons of the same sex was considered void ab initio in common law, and as such same-sex couples could not marry on the islands; in 1866, in Hyde v Hyde and Woodmansee (a case of polygamy), Lord Penzance's judgment began: "Marriage as understood in Christendom is the voluntary union for life of one man and one woman, to the exclusion of all others." Explicit bans on same-sex marriages were enacted in England and Wales in the Nullity of Marriage Act 1971, and later the Matrimonial Causes Act 1973. Similar laws were passed in Scotland and Northern Ireland. These bans, since repealed, did not apply to the Falkland Islands.

The marriage ordinance was repealed in 1996 and replaced with the Marriage Ordinance 1996, which did not contain any changes with regard to the recognition of same-sex unions. In March 2014, same-sex marriage was legalised in England and Wales with the enactment of the Marriage (Same Sex Couples) Act 2013, but this law does not apply to the territory.

== Same-sex marriage law ==
On 13 May 2015, the Attorney General of the Falkland Islands, Mark Lewis, recommended that the Executive Council consider the legalisation of same-sex marriage or civil partnerships in the territory. On 13 January 2016, following a public consultation, the Council instructed the Attorney General to prepare an amendment to the Marriage Ordinance to permit same-sex marriages. 90% of the participants to the consultation supported same-sex marriage, and 94% were in favour of civil partnerships for all couples.

The draft amendment was considered by the Executive Council on 22 February 2017. The Council instructed Lewis to publish it in the official gazette, thereby commencing the legislative process as a first reading, as well as to prepare further legislation necessary for its implementation. On 30 March, the Legislative Assembly approved the same-sex marriage bill by a 7 to 1 vote. The bill would allow same-sex couples to marry and enter into civil partnerships. A government spokesperson said, "The move sends a clear and powerful message that all people and all relationships are equal, it does not matter whether they are a same sex couple or not and the law now reflects the Falkland Islands' tradition of being an open, tolerant and respectful community." The law received royal assent by Governor Colin Roberts on 13 April, and went into effect on 29 April. A community event to celebrate the legalisation of same-sex marriage took place in Stanley that same day. The first same-sex marriage in the Falkland Islands was performed at Christina Bay near Cape Pembroke on 20 November 2017.

19 December 2017 vote in the Legislative Assembly
Constituency	Voted for	Voted against	Abstained
Stanley	4: Jan Cheek; Barry Elsby; Michael Poole; Gavin Short	1: Mike Summers	–
Camp	3: Roger Edwards; Ian Hansen; Phyl Rendell	–	–
Total	7	1	0
Total	87.5%	12.5%	0.0%

The Marriage Ordinance 1996 was amended to state: The marriage of same sex couples is lawful. In addition, it was modified to guarantee equal treatment between same-sex and opposite-sex marriages:

A same sex marriage solemnised under this Ordinance has and must be treated in the same manner and afforded the same status as a marriage between a man and a woman.

The Interpretation and General Clauses Ordinance was amended to state that "'marriage' includes a same sex marriage solemnised or recognised under the Marriage Ordinance 1996", and to state that all references to "husband", "wife", "husband and wife", and "widow and widower" in all other ordinances are to be read as including same-sex couples. In law, a civil partnership is defined as "a relationship between a man and a woman or two people of the same sex ("civil partners") which is formed when they register as civil partners of each other". Civil partnerships performed abroad, such as in the United Kingdom, are recognised in the Falkland Islands.

== Religious performance ==
While the Church of England has allowed its clergy to bless same-sex marriages since 17 December 2023, it is unclear if a similar policy exists in the Parish of the Falkland Islands, an extra-provincial church in the Anglican Communion. The 2016 public consultation on same-sex marriage found that 87% of respondents supported allowing religious denominations to perform church weddings for same-sex couples.

== See also ==
- LGBT rights in the Falkland Islands
- Same-sex marriage in the United Kingdom
- Recognition of same-sex unions in the British Overseas Territories
