= Same-sex marriage in Gibraltar =

Same-sex marriage has been legal in Gibraltar since 15 December 2016. A bill for the legalisation of same-sex marriages was approved 15–0 by the Parliament on 26 October and received royal assent on 1 November 2016. Gibraltar was the sixth British Overseas Territory to legalise same-sex marriage, after South Georgia and the South Sandwich Islands, Akrotiri and Dhekelia, the British Indian Ocean Territory, the Pitcairn Islands, and the British Antarctic Territory.

Gibraltar has also recognised civil partnerships providing similar rights and responsibilities to those of marriage since 28 March 2014.

== Civil partnerships ==
In January 2014, a civil partnership bill was published for community consultation and headed for introduction in the Gibraltar Parliament. On 21 March, the bill was approved by Parliament with no noticeable opposition. It was given royal assent on 25 March by Governor James Dutton, officially becoming the Civil Partnership Act 2014. The law and related rules and regulations took effect on 28 March. The law also allows adoption by civil partners, as mandated by a court ruling in 2013.

21 March 2014 vote in the Parliament
Party	Voted for	Voted against	Absent (Did not vote)
Gibraltar Socialist Labour Party	7: Paul Balban; Joseph Bossano; John Cortes; Gilbert Licudi; Fabian Picardo; Samantha Sacramento; Albert Isola	–	–
Gibraltar Social Democrats	6: Damon Bossino; Isobel Ellul-Hammond; Daniel Feetham; Selwyn Figueras; James Netto; Edwin Reyes	–	1: Peter Caruana
Liberal Party of Gibraltar	3: Neil Costa; Joseph Garcia; Steven Linares	–	–
Total	16	0	1
Total	94.1%	0.0%	5.9%

Civil partnerships offer the same rights and benefits as marriage in terms of inheritance tax, property rights, social security, pension benefits, next of kin rights in hospitals, adoption rights, and others.

== Same-sex marriage ==
Laws regarding same-sex partnerships in Europe¹ Marriage Civil union Limited domestic recognition (cohabitation) Unrecognized Constitution limits marriage to opposite-sex couples ¹ May include recent laws or court decisions that have not yet entered into effect.

=== Legislative action ===
The GSLP–Liberal Alliance, re-elected in 2015, included the following commitment in their election manifesto: "We will now publish a Command Paper in order to take the views of the public on how to best deal with the request by some for civil marriage to be extended to same sex couples. We are totally committed both to ensuring that religious denominations are not forced to change their practices, beliefs or sacraments in any way and to the principle that the State must not discriminate between individuals based on the grounds of sexual orientation. The results of the responses to the Command Paper will be published by June [2016]." The Equality Rights Group (ERG) said it "did not go far enough" and asked for more commitment to introduce same-sex marriage. On 22 December 2015, a command paper on introducing same-sex marriage was published and was under public consultation until 15 January 2016. On 4 January 2016, it was announced that the consultation period had been extended to 29 January 2016. On 5 January, a government spokesman said that a referendum on the issue would not be ruled out until all the comments submitted by the public had been considered.

On 18 January 2016, in his New Year's message, Daniel Feetham, leader of the Social Democrats, declared his support for same-sex marriage and, despite allowing members of his party a free vote on matters of conscience, said that his parliamentary colleagues all supported the issue as well. He said that it was up to the Government of Gibraltar to decide on how to proceed with the issue. On 20 January 2016, Chief Minister Fabian Picardo announced that there would be no referendum on same-sex marriage after a parliamentary debate on the issue was initiated by the opposition Social Democrats. In that same debate, Picardo said he expected the feedback from the consultation process to improve the same-sex marriage bill.

On 21 March 2016, the government announced it had received 3,490 responses to the public consultation and that, due to the controversial nature of the subject, it would establish an Inter-Ministerial Committee (composed of four government ministers: Gilbert Licudi, Samantha Sacramento, Neil Costa, and Albert Isola) to listen to the views of the various groups and individuals who had expressed a view on the subject, and report its findings back to the cabinet by June 2016. In response to the announcement, the chairman of the Equality Rights Group, Felix Alvarez, questioned the commitment of the governing GSLP–Liberal Alliance to legislate on the matter and urged both "the LGBT community at large and their friends and supporters to remain calm and reserve their responses until the government comes up with a definitive answer on how to handle this situation". Based on its own statistics and past advocacy efforts, the ERG claimed that over 63% of those consultation responses were in favor of same-sex marriage and that "the situation should not be made more complicated than it should be".

A government bill on the legalisation of same-sex marriage was published on 15 August 2016. On 26 October, the Civil Marriage Amendment Act 2016 was passed in the Gibraltar Parliament with unanimous support from all 15 members present during the vote. An amendment to remove a controversial part of the bill which allowed deputy registrars to opt out of conducting same-sex marriages was defeated 11 to 4 with only some of the Opposition MPs voting in favor. The bill required that, in circumstances where a deputy registrar did not agree to officiate a same-sex marriage, an alternative registrar had to be assigned to conduct the marriage. The bill received royal assent by Deputy Governor Nick Pyle, acting for Governor Ed Davis, on 1 November and took effect on 15 December 2016. The first same-sex marriage in Gibraltar was performed the following day at the Registry Office between Aaron Mills and Adrian Charles Triay-Dignam.

26 October 2016 vote in the Parliament
Party	Voted for	Voted against	Absent (Did not vote)
Gibraltar Socialist Labour Party	6: Paul Balban; Joseph Bossano; John Cortes; Gilbert Licudi; Fabian Picardo; Samantha Sacramento	–	1: Albert Isola
Gibraltar Social Democrats	5: Daniel Anthony Feetham; Edwin Reyes; Roy Clinton; Lawrence Llamas; Elliott Phillips	–	1: Peter Caruana
Liberal Party of Gibraltar	3: Neil Costa; Joseph Garcia; Steven Linares	–	–
Independent	1: Marlene Hassan-Nahon	–	–
Total	15	0	2
Total	88.2%	0.0%	11.8%

The law introduced a new definition of married spouses in the Marriage Act 1948 as "includ[ing] opposite sex and same sex couples". It also amended the Matrimonial Causes Act 1962 to state that "in relation to a marriage of a same sex couple, a reference to a husband and wife shall be read as a reference to a husband and a husband or a wife and a wife, as applicable, and parties to a marriage shall be construed accordingly". The Matrimonial Causes Act was also modified to state:

"marriage" includes a reference to marriage of a same sex couple

In May 2017, a same-sex couple seeking to convert their civil partnership into a marriage were told to divorce first by authorities, who cited a lack of legislation for converting civil partnerships to marriages. This occurred despite the Equality Rights Group confirming that such a provision existed in the law, and that the matter was simply one of excessive paperwork. The law was officially amended in late 2019 so that deputy registrars are no longer able to opt-out of performing civil same-sex marriages. The amendment was assented by Governor Ed Davis and gazetted shortly thereafter.

=== Statistics ===
By October 2017, 39 same-sex marriages had taken place in Gibraltar, with 32 of these being between couples from overseas; 25 between two men and 7 between two women.

=== Religious performance ===
Religious denominations are permitted to solemnise same-sex marriages. The Civil Marriage Amendment Act 2016 provides that ministers may not be compelled by any means to carry out same-sex weddings if this would violate their personal beliefs.

The Methodist Church of Great Britain has allowed its ministers to conduct same-sex marriages since 2021. The Methodist Conference voted 254 to 46 in favour of the move in June 2021. A freedom of conscience clause allows ministers with objections to opt out of performing same-sex weddings. Reverend Fidel Patron of the Gibraltar Methodist Church responded in July 2021 that he was "not in a position to answer yet" as to whether it would perform same-sex weddings. In February 2026, Reverend David Barrett stated that same-sex marriage "[was] permissible in the right pastoral circumstances".

== See also ==
- LGBT rights in Gibraltar
- Recognition of same-sex unions in the British Overseas Territories
- Recognition of same-sex unions in Europe
- Same-sex marriage in the United Kingdom
