= LGBTQ rights in the Pitcairn Islands =

LGBTQ rights in Pitcairn Islands
- Pitcairn Islands
- Legal status: Legal since 2001
- Military: LGBT people allowed to serve openly (British responsibility)
- Discrimination protections: Sexual orientation since 2010

Family rights
- Recognition of relationships: Same-sex marriage since 2015
- Adoption: Legal since 2015

Lesbian, gay, bisexual, and transgender (LGBT) people in the British Overseas Territory of the Pitcairn Islands enjoy most of the same rights as non-LGBT people. Same-sex sexual activity is legal, discrimination based on sexual orientation is constitutionally outlawed and same-sex marriage has been legal since 14 May 2015.

== Legality of same-sex sexual activity ==
The 1893 Laws of the islands, the oldest codified set of laws, did not mention homosexuality. Pitcairn Island was placed under the jurisdiction of the High Commissioner for the Western Pacific in 1898. The 1904 laws, written by R. T. Simons, made it a crime for "[u]nmarried persons of either sex" to "[congregate] together in such a manner as to cause scandal or to endanger the morals of the younger members of the community".

The Judicature Ordinance 1961 extended the law of England to the islands. Therefore, homosexual activity was expressly illegal in Pitcairn until the passage of the Sexual Offences Act 1967.

== Recognition of same-sex partnerships ==
Same-sex marriage became legal in the Pitcairn Islands on 14 May 2015; however, none of the around 50 Pitcairn Islanders currently residing in the territory is known to be in a same-sex relationship. An ordinance to legalise such marriages was unanimously approved by the Island Council on 1 April 2015, and was signed by Governor Jonathan Sinclair on 5 May. It was published on 13 May 2015. The law, known as the Same Sex Marriage and Civil Partnerships Ordinance 2015, also provides for the recognition of a registered civil partnership performed outside of Pitcairn. The move to legalise same-sex marriage was widely published on international media. Deputy Governor Kevin Lynch said that the change had been suggested by British authorities. A local resident said the law "wasn't even a major point of discussion until the outside world began catching up on the news".

== Discrimination protections ==
The Pitcairn Islands Constitution Order 2010 bans discrimination on the basis of sexual orientation, among other categories, reading:

[T]he expression "discriminatory" means affording different treatment to different persons on any ground such as sex, sexual orientation, race, colour, language, religion, age, disability, political or other opinion, national or social origin, association with a national minority, property, birth or other status.

The term "gender identity" is mentioned only twice in Pitcairn law. Firstly, the Marriage Ordinance states that "'marriage' means the union of two people regardless of their sex, sexual orientation or gender identity". Secondly, the Sentencing Ordinance requires courts to take into account certain individual factors when dealing with an offender, including if the offence was committed on the basis of the victim's gender identity. Sexual orientation is also mentioned.

== Adoption and parenting ==
The 2015 same-sex marriage legislation includes a provision stating that same-sex couples may be parents to a child. The Adoption of Infants Ordinance states that married couples, unmarried couples and single people may jointly apply to adopt children.

According to a 2006 UK government report, there have been 9 adoptions in the Pitcairn Islands since 1954, the latest being in 1979.

== Military service ==
LGBT individuals may legally serve in the British Armed Forces, as defence is the responsibility of the United Kingdom.

== Summary table ==
Same-sex sexual activity legal	Yes (Since 2001)
Equal age of consent	Yes (Since 2001)
Anti-discrimination laws in employment	Yes (Since 2010)
Anti-discrimination laws in the provision of goods and services	Yes (Since 2010)
Anti-discrimination laws in all other areas (incl. indirect discrimination, hate speech)	Yes (Since 2010)
Recognition of same-sex unions (e.g. civil union)	Yes (Since 2015)
Same-sex marriage	Yes (Since 2015)
Stepchild adoption by same-sex couples	Yes (Since 2015)
Joint adoption by same-sex couples	Yes (Since 2015)
LGBT people allowed to serve openly in the military	Yes (Since 2000; UK responsible for defence)
Right to change legal gender	Yes (UK Gender Recognition Act)

== See also ==
- LGBTQ rights in Oceania
- LGBTQ rights in the United Kingdom
