= LGBTQ rights in Gibraltar =

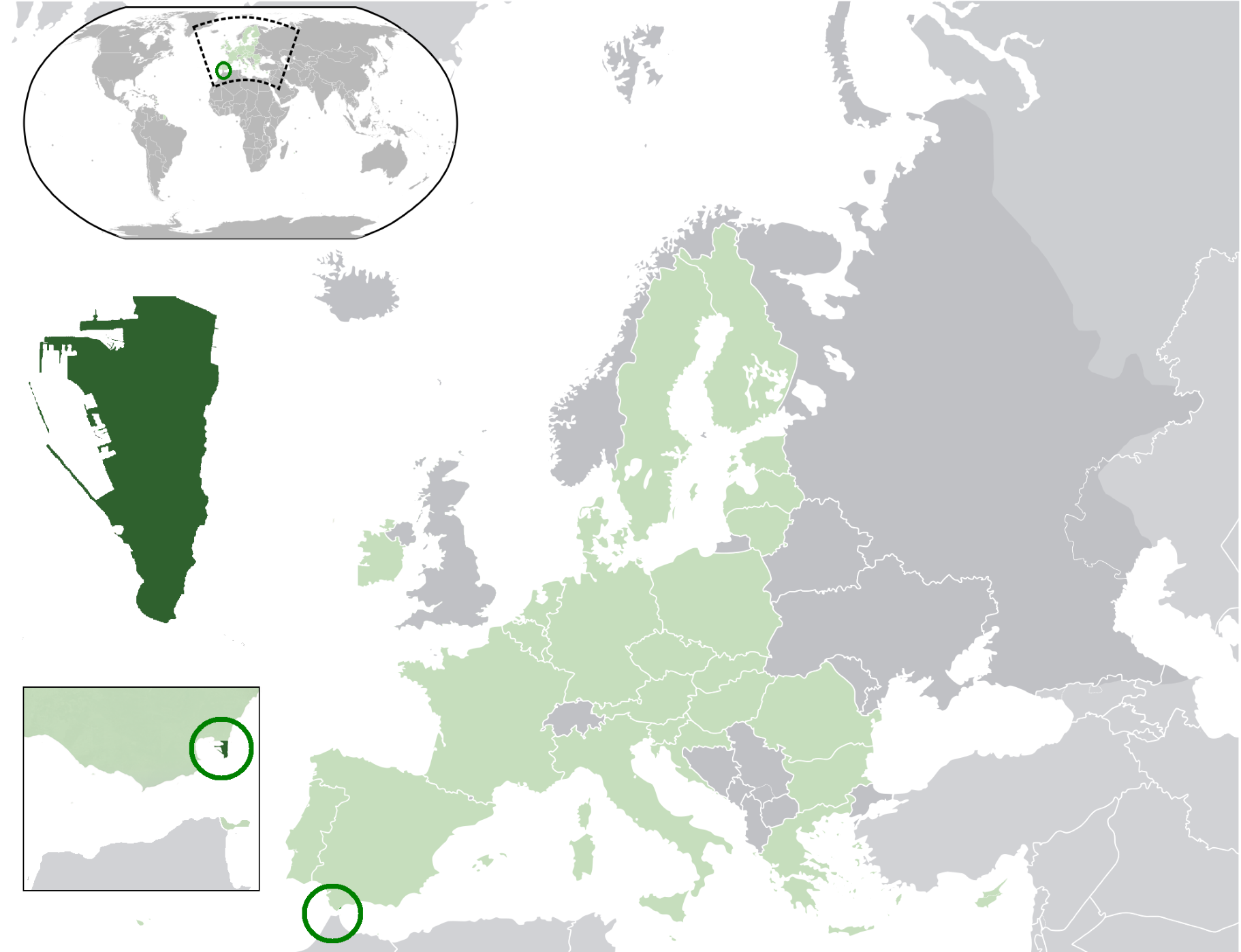
- Location of Gibraltar (dark green) – in Europe (light green & dark grey) – in the European Union (light green) – [Legend]
- Legal status: Legal since 1993, age of consent equal since 2012
- Gender identity: Transgender persons not allowed to change legal gender
- Military: LGBT people allowed to serve openly
- Discrimination protections: Protections for sexual orientation and "gender reassignment" since 2007

Family rights
- Recognition of relationships: Civil partnerships since 2014; Same-sex marriage since 2016
- Adoption: Same-sex couples allowed to adopt since 2014

Lesbian, gay, bisexual, transgender, and queer (LGBTQ) rights within the British Overseas Territory of Gibraltar have evolved significantly in the past decades. Same-sex sexual activity has been legal since 1993 and the age of consent was equalised to 16 in 2012. The Supreme Court of Gibraltar ruled in April 2013 that same-sex couples have the right to adopt. Civil partnerships have been available to both same-sex and opposite-sex couples since March 2014, and in October 2016, Gibraltar voted to legalise same-sex marriage with the Civil Marriage Amendment Act 2016 passing unanimously in Parliament. The law received royal assent on 1 November and took effect on 15 December 2016.

== Legality of same-sex sexual activity ==
Gibraltar's laws around homosexuality were first drafted in the Victorian period. This period did not believe women had a sexual life or identity separate from men. Consequently, there was no need for the law to recognize the existence of potential female/female sexual activity and laws about same-sex sexual activity only related to men. Homosexuality, defined legally as male sodomy, was decriminalized in Gibraltar in 1993 following pressure from the European Court of Human Rights and Government of the United Kingdom. Because it related to male sodomy, it did not apply to women.

In Gibraltar, the age of consent for all sexual activity regardless of sexuality and/or gender was equalised at 16 in April 2011, when under Supreme Court order the previous law – under which the age of consent for gay males was 18 – was found to be unconstitutional. Heterosexual anal sex was decriminalised at the same time and the age of consent set at 16. Gay male sexual conduct was decriminalised in 1993.

Political campaigning prior to the 2007 elections was prominent with equality rights organisation Gib Gay Rights (GGR), headed by human rights campaigner Felix Alvarez, openly challenging the incumbent Chief Minister, Peter Caruana, for more rights in Gibraltar for gay and lesbian people.

Campaigning on the issue of an equal age of consent of 16 had been strongly undertaken. The issues were raised at the Foreign Affairs Committee enquiry into the overseas territories in 2008, where they concluded:

We recommend that the Government should take steps to ensure that discrimination on the basis of sexual orientation or gender status is made illegal in all overseas territories.

On 18 May 2009, the Gibraltar Parliament rejected a private member's bill, proposed by the Minister for Justice, to equalise the age of consent. It was opposed by the GSLP/Liberal opposition for technical reasons due to the way the bill was written. Government MPs were given a free vote on the bill. It was defeated, as government MPs were split on its approval, and the opposition members all voted against it.

The influential Gibraltar Women's Association (GWA) also called for the age consent to be levelled at 18.

On 1 October 2009, new proposed legislation would enable the Government of Gibraltar to ask the Supreme Court to test whether existing or draft laws are compatible with the Constitution. This would provide a simplified, purpose-built mechanism to deal with contentious issues such as the age of consent. In March 2010, it sought an opinion from the Court to see if the unequal age of consent was discrimination under the principles of the European Council.

On 1 April 2010, Secretary of State for Foreign and Commonwealth Affairs David Miliband pointed out that if a British Overseas Territory is unwilling to meet "international obligations" such as equalising the age of consent it may be imposed by an Order in Council.

On 8 April 2011, the Supreme Court of Gibraltar ruled that a higher age of consent of 18 for gay sex was unconstitutional, and thus mandated an equal age of consent of 16, while at the same time also decriminalising heterosexual anal sex.

In August 2011, the gender-neutral Crimes Act 2011 was approved, which sets an equal age of consent of 16 regardless of sexual orientation, and reflects the recent Supreme Court decision in statute law. The law took effect on 23 November 2012.

== Recognition of same-sex relationships ==
=== Civil partnerships ===
In March 2014, the Parliament passed a civil partnership law, granting same-sex couples most of the rights of marriage, including allowing the adoption of children by civil partners, as mandated by the court ruling in 2013.

=== Same-sex marriage ===
Same-sex marriage became an issue of interest for the Government after their re-election in 2015. A command paper to that effect was published in December 2015 and a public consultation was held, whilst talk of a possible referendum on the issue was not ruled out. The leader of the opposition Social Democrats Party announced his support for same-sex marriage in January 2016, days before the Government ruled out a referendum. An inter-ministerial committee was set up in March 2016 to listen to stakeholder concerns and more than 3,400 responses to the discussion were received. The Government published a bill to legalise same-sex marriage in August 2016.

On 26 October 2016, the Civil Marriage Amendment Bill 2016 was passed in the Gibraltar Parliament with unanimous support from all 15 members present during the vote. The bill received royal assent on 1 November and took effect on 15 December 2016. The first legally recognized same-sex marriage in Gibraltar took place the next day.

The GSLP–Liberal Alliance, who were re-elected in 2015, included the following commitment in their election manifesto: "We will now publish a Command Paper in order to take the views of the public on how to best deal with the request by some for civil marriage to be extended to same sex couples. We are totally committed both to ensuring that religious denominations are not forced to change their practices, beliefs or sacraments in any way and to the principle that the State must not discriminate between individuals based on the grounds of sexual orientation. The results of the responses to the Command Paper will be published by June [2016]." The Equal Rights Group said it did not go far enough and asked for more commitment to introduce same-sex marriage.

On 22 December 2015, a command paper on introducing same-sex marriage was published and was under consultation until 15 January 2016. On 4 January 2016, it was announced that the consultation period had been extended to 29 January 2016. On 5 January 2016, a spokesman for the Government stated that a referendum on the issue had not yet been ruled out until all the comments submitted by the public had been considered.

On 18 January 2016, in his New Year message, GSD leader Daniel Feetham declared his support for same-sex marriage and, despite allowing members of his party a free vote on matters of conscience, stated that his parliamentary colleagues all declared their support for the issue as well. He then stated that it was up to the Government to decide on how to proceed with the issue when the time comes.

On 20 January 2016, it was announced by Chief Minister Fabian Picardo (GSLP) that there would be no referendum on same-sex marriage after a parliamentary debate on the issue was initiated by the Opposition. In that same debate, the Chief Minister stated that he expected the feedback from the consultation process to actually improve the bill on same-sex marriage.

On 21 March 2016, the Government announced that it had received 3,490 responses in regards to the public consultation and that, due to the controversial nature of the subject, it would establish an Inter-Ministerial Committee (composed of four members of the Government: Gilbert Licudi, Samantha Sacramento, Neil Costa, and Albert Isola) to listen to the views of the various groups and many of the individuals who expressed a view on the subject, and report its findings back to the Cabinet by June 2016. In response to the Government's announcement, the chairman of the Equality Rights Group (ERG), Felix Alvarez, questioned the commitment of the governing GSLP-Liberal Alliance to legislate on the matter and urged both the LGBT community at large and their friends and supporters to remain calm and reserve their responses until the Government comes up with a definitive answer on how to handle this situation. Based on their own statistics and past advocacy efforts, ERG claimed that over 63% of those consultation responses were in favor of same-sex marriage and that the situation shouldn't be made more complicated than it should be.

On 15 August 2016, a government bill on the legalisation of same-sex marriage was published. On 26 October 2016, the Civil Marriage Amendment Bill 2016 was passed in the Gibraltar Parliament with unanimous support from all 15 members present during the vote. An amendment to remove a controversial part of the bill, which allows deputy registrars to opt out of conducting same-sex marriages was defeated 11 to 4 with only some of the Opposition MPs voting in favor. The bill requires that, in circumstances where a deputy registrar does not agree to officiate a same-sex marriage, an alternative registrar must be assigned to conduct the marriage. The bill received royal assent on 1 November and took effect on 15 December 2016. The first same-sex marriage in Gibraltar was performed the following day.

In May 2017, Nadine Rodríguez and Alicia Muscat sought to convert their civil partnership into a marriage were told to divorce first by authorities, who cited a lack of legislation for converting a civil partnership to a marriage. This occurred despite the Gibraltar Equality Rights Group confirming that such a provision existed in the law, and that the matter was simply one of excessive paperwork.

== Adoption, surrogacy and family planning ==
A long-term lesbian couple tried to adopt in Gibraltar but were denied on the basis of the lack of legal recognition of their relationship under Gibraltar adoption laws. The couple had a child together using IVF, where one woman had her fertilized eggs implanted in her partner's uterus. They then went to court to challenge these laws. On 10 April 2013, the Supreme Court ruled that section 5 (2) of the Adoption Act 1951 was in violation of the Gibraltar Constitution thus, in effect, de jure legalising LGBT adoption in Gibraltar. The government announced that they planned to amend the law as soon as possible and that the Care Agency would take appropriate measures to allow same-sex couples to adopt. The government did so the following year as part of its civil partnership law (see above). Effective since 18 April 2024, the newly passed and implemented “Adoption Act 2023” went into full effect - explicitly allowing same-sex couples to adopt children without discrimination.

In June 2017, the Gibraltar Health Authority approved an amendment to its in vitro fertilisation policy to allow lesbian couples to access assisted reproductive technology.

In February 2021, Gibraltar implemented a surrogacy law, allowing individuals and couples, married or in a civil partnership, unable to conceive, to engage in non-commercial, altruistic surrogacy. The legislation also provides automatic recognition to children of same-sex couples conceived through artificial insemination.

== Activism ==
Nadine Rodríguez and Alicia Muscat, one of Gibraltar's most visible lesbian couples and most important activists for LGBT rights, became a couple in 1988. In late 2008, the couple tried to include each other on a shared rental agreement for an apartment through the Gibraltar Housing Allocation Committee, but were denied the ability. As same-sex partnerships were not recognized in Gibraltar, lesbian couples could not share legal responsibility in things like renting public apartment, in case something were to happen to the other member of the couple. In December 2008, in the case titled Nadine Rodriguez v. the Minister for House of the Government of Gibraltar & ORS, a local court ruled in their favor of the couple in that they be allowed to share a rental contract but the Government appealed this. In May 2009, their case appeared before the Supreme Court of Gibraltar who reaffirmed the rights of the couple. When they continued to be denied the ability to share a lease contract, they took the matter to the British courts, London’s Privy Council, to get their ability to share property recognized. The couple again proved successful in their claims. Starting in 2009, they began trying to get same-sex marriage legalized in Gibraltar using judicial processes. In 2017, the couple were presented with the Independent Civil Society award. They were recognized at a ceremony at the Gibraltar Garrison Library.

In September 2000, Gibraltarian Felix Alvarez created Gib Gay Rights in response to the lack of movement on homosexual rights following the decriminalizing of male homosexuality in 1993. 21 people were present at the first meeting of the newly formed organization. In September 2005, the group's executive committee included three women, Sandra Poveda, Annette Vallejo, and Susan Haywood.

== Discrimination protections ==
Lesbians faced discrimination in Gibraltar society during the 1990s and 2000s. Because of historic discrimination against lesbians and the illegality of homosexuality until 1992, many lesbians in Gibraltar married men to hide their orientation. The ability to easily hide their orientation was also difficult in earlier periods as a lack of a large housing stock and the small size of Gibraltar meant the multiple generations of the same family often lived together.

The 2006 Constitution does not mention sexual orientation. Proposals, made public in early March 2002, specifically omitted direct reference to "sexual orientation" as a category to be constitutionally protected. Other categories are clearly included.

The Equal Opportunities Act 2006, which came into force on 1 March 2007, prohibits discrimination in areas such as employment and the provision of goods and services on numerous grounds, including sexual orientation and "gender reassignment". "Sexual orientation" is defined as a "sexual orientation towards persons of the same sex, persons of the opposite sex, or persons of the same sex and of the opposite sex". "Gender reassignment" is defined as "a process for the purpose of reassigning a person's sex by changing physiological or other attributes of sex".

=== Hate crime legislation ===
A bill to amend the Crimes Act 2011, that would criminalise both hatred and harassment on the ground of sexual orientation as a hate crime, was approved by the Gibraltar Parliament on 19 September 2013 and given royal assent on 25 September. The law took effect on 10 October 2013.

In July 2021, the Gibraltar Justice Ministry is investigating a proposal for introducing new laws "tackling lurking homophobia". The move was revealed in Parliament by Chief Minister Fabian Picardo and comes against the backdrop of “disgusting lurking homophobia” on social media as a result of initiatives and events to mark Pride month earlier this year. “The Government will not accept the continued homophobia we are seeing,” Mr Picardo said. “The Government will therefore monitor whether it may be necessary to further bolster our legislation to make it a specific criminal offence to denigrate a person as a result of their sexual orientation.”

In July 2026, Parliament passed a bill amending hate crime and hate speech legislation to include protections for "transgender identity."

== Conversion therapy ==
In July 2026, Parliament passed a bill making it an offence to offer or practice conversion therapy.

== Summary table ==
| Same-sex sexual activity legal | Yes (Since 1993) |
| Equal age of consent | Yes (Since 2012) |
| Anti-discrimination laws in employment | Yes (Since 2007) |
| Anti-discrimination laws in the provision of goods and services | Yes (Since 2007) |
| Anti-discrimination laws in all other areas (incl. indirect discrimination, hate speech) | Yes (Since 2013) |
| Same-sex marriage(s) | Yes (Since 2016) |
| Recognition of same-sex couples (civil partnership) | Yes (Since 2014) |
| Joint and step-child adoption by same-sex couples recognised | Yes (Since 2014; Codified in 2024) |
| LGBT people allowed to serve in the military | Yes (Responsibility of the British Armed Forces) |
| Right to change legal gender | No (Under consideration) |
| Access to IVF for lesbian couples | Yes (Since 2017) |
| Altruistic surrogacy for gay male couples | Yes (Since 2021) |
| Conversion therapy banned | Yes (Since 2026) |
| MSMs allowed to donate blood | |

== See also ==
- Lesbianism in Gibraltar
- LGBT rights in Europe
- LGBT rights in the United Kingdom
- Same-sex marriage in Gibraltar
- Rodriguez v Minister of Housing
