= Governor Sinclair =

Governor Sinclair may refer to:

- John Sinclair, 1st Baron Pentland (1860–1925), Governor of Madras from 1912 to 1919
- Jonathan Sinclair (born 1970), Governor of the Pitcairn, Henderson, Ducie and Oeno Islands from 2014 to 2018
