= Same-sex marriage in the British Antarctic Territory =

Same-sex marriage has been legal in the British Antarctic Territory since 13 October 2016. A new marriage ordinance bringing territorial legislation in line with the law in force in England and Wales was proclaimed by Commissioner Peter Hayes on 13 October, legalising marriage by same-sex couples.

The British Antarctic Territory was the fifth British Overseas Territory to legalise same-sex marriage after South Georgia and the South Sandwich Islands, Akrotiri and Dhekelia, the British Indian Ocean Territory and the Pitcairn Islands.

== Background ==
In 1908, the United Kingdom declared sovereignty over South Georgia, the South Sandwich Islands, the South Shetland Islands, the South Orkney Islands and Graham Land. In 1917, the UK modified its claim, so as to include all the territory in the sector stretching to the South Pole. The territories were administered as Falkland Islands Dependencies. The British Antarctic Territory, comprising the Antarctic Peninsula with the sector extending to the South Pole, the South Shetland Islands and the South Orkney Islands, was formed and became its own separate territory in 1962 with the enactment of the British Antarctic Territory Order in Council 1962.

The British Antarctic Territory Order 1989, enacted by the Privy Council in May 1989, provides for a head of government in the territory, known as the Commissioner for the British Antarctic Territory. The Commissioner can make laws, known as ordinances, covering different aspects of life in the territory, including the judicial system, tax, the allocation of public funds, the environment and marriage. Concerning matters not covered by local legislation, the law in force in England and Wales shall be applied in the territory, in accordance with the Administration of Justice Ordinance 1990. The Marriage Ordinance 1990, assented by Commissioner Merrick Baker-Bates on 13 September 1990, did not contain an explicit ban on same-sex marriage, but generally assumed married spouses to be of the opposite sex. In addition, a marriage between persons of the same sex was considered void ab initio in common law, and as such same-sex couples could not marry in the territory.

== Same-sex marriage law ==
Same-sex marriage has been legal in England and Wales since 13 March 2014, following the enactment of the Marriage (Same Sex Couples) Act 2013, which received royal assent by Queen Elizabeth II on 17 July 2013. However, the law did not extend to the British Antarctic Territory. In July 2016, Commissioner Peter Hayes published a draft of a new marriage ordinance to repeal the Marriage Ordinance 1990. In a report explaining the reasons for the new ordinance, the Foreign and Commonwealth Office wrote that it "imports provisions from the law in England in relation to the capacity to marry and the requirements for consent. It is this provision, together with other reformed sections that would allow persons of the same sex to get married in the Territory." The draft was under consultation between 2 August and 30 September 2016. The ordinance was proclaimed by Commissioner Hayes on 13 October 2016 and took effect forthwith. Along with reformed sections permitting same-sex couples to marry, the ordinance made it easier for marriages to be arranged in the territory. Marriages are solemnised by marriage officers, who are appointed by the Commissioner, at "any place that the marriage officer considers suitable", either within the territory or on board a ship within territorial waters. If the intending spouses are British citizens, the marriage will be automatically recognised in the United Kingdom. Article 4 of the Marriage Ordinance 2016 states:

The law of England, as for the time being in force in England, relating to – a) the capacity of a person to marry; b) the capacity of persons to marry each other; [...] shall be the law relating to those matters in force in the Territory.

The first same-sex marriage in the territory took place on 24 April 2022 between Eric Bourne and Stephen Carpenter on board RRS Sir David Attenborough near the Rothera Research Station on Adelaide Island. The first lesbian marriage occurred on 14 February 2023 between Sarah and June Snyder-Kamen at Bongrain Point on Pourquoi Pas Island.

== See also ==
- Same-sex marriage in the United Kingdom
- Recognition of same-sex unions in the British Overseas Territories
