= Recognition of same-sex unions in the Turks and Caicos Islands =

Same-sex marriage is not recognised in the Turks and Caicos Islands. In March 2024, the High Court of the Turks and Caicos Islands found that the government's refusal to issue a spousal permit to a same-sex spouse was unconstitutional, but ordered no remedy. On October 27, 2025, the Court of Appeal ruled that the government must interpret the term "spouse" in the Immigration Act to include same-sex partners legally married in other jurisdictions.

== Background ==
The Marriage Ordinance does not explicit ban same-sex marriage, but generally refers to married spouses as "husband" and "wife". The Constitution of the Turks and Caicos Islands, approved in 2011, notes that the government "shall respect" the right of every unmarried man and woman of marriageable age as defined by law to freely marry a person of the opposite sex and to found a family. However, the Constitution does not explicitly define the term "marriage" nor does it explicitly prohibit same-sex marriage. It further states that "spouses shall be entitled to equal rights and shall be subject to equal responsibilities as between themselves and as regards their children both during marriage and, if the marriage is dissolved, on and after dissolution." Article 10(1) states:

Every unmarried man and woman of marriageable age (as determined by or under any law) has the right to marry a person of the opposite sex and found a family.

In July 2022, Michael Cashman introduced legislation to the House of Lords to legalise same-sex marriage in the remaining six British Overseas Territories that banned it—Anguilla, Bermuda, the British Virgin Islands, the Cayman Islands, Montserrat and the Turks and Caicos Islands. The bill would "empower the Governor of each Territory to make changes to the law in the Territory to recognize the lawfulness of same-sex marriage and allow for the solemnization of marriage of same-sex couples." It had its first reading in the House of Lords on 6 July. This was not the first attempt to extend same-sex marriage rights to all British Overseas Territories; in February 2019, a Foreign Affairs Select Committee report recommended extending same-sex marriage to all territories with an Order in Council. At the time, the Leader of the Opposition in the Turks and Caicos Islands, Washington Misick, had accused the British Government of trying to "neutralise the authority" of the Caribbean territories. MP Chris Bryant accused territories of wanting to "have their cake and eat it": "You want to be under the British umbrella, but you do not want to be part of the British way of life." Misick, who was elected premier following the 2021 election, reiterated his opposition to same-sex marriage in July 2022: "The people of the Turks and Caicos islands voted me into office and voted this government into office. So no, no decision will be made about marriage or any of that unless the people are consulted and that includes the entire people of these islands."

== Developments in 2021–present ==
Homosexuality laws in Central America and the Caribbean Islands. Same-sex marriage Other type of partnership Unregistered cohabitation No recognition of same-sex couples Constitution limits marriage to opposite-sex couples Same-sex sexual activity illegal but law not enforced

In October 2021, a dual Turks and Caicos Islander-American same-sex couple, Richard Sankar and Tim Haymon, sued immigration authorities to have their marriage, performed in Florida in 2020, recognised for the purpose of allowing Haymon to legally reside and work in the islands without the need for a work permit. The territory's immigration office had denied the request to recognise the marriage two months prior, arguing that Haymon did not meet the definition of a "spouse". The couple argued in court that failure to recognize their marriage was a violation of their right to privacy, and based their reasoning on rulings from the European Court of Human Rights (ECHR) that the absence of legal recognition for same-sex couples is discriminatory. The lawsuit was filed amid ongoing court challenges over the constitutionally of same-sex marriage bans in Bermuda and the Cayman Islands. Those bans were later upheld by the Judicial Committee of the Privy Council in March 2022.

Oral arguments were heard in court in November 2022. On 13 March 2024, High Court Judge Anthony Gruchot ruled in Haymon & Sankar v. Been & The Attorney General of the Turks and Caicos Islands that granting spousal resident permits solely to heterosexual couples was discriminatory and violated constitutional protections. However, Gruchot ordered no remedy and added that "[t]he denial to a same sex couple of a right to marry and hence a right to have an overseas same-sex marriage recognised in Turks and Caicos Islands is not, in my judgment discriminatory....The question that arises is whether the refusal to give the plaintiffs access to the same rights as a married couple, based on their sexual orientation, is discriminatory. The Constitution at Section 16, gives protection from discrimination based, among other things, on sexual orientation." Both the government and the couple appealed the decision to the Turks and Caicos Court of Appeal, which heard oral arguments on 23 and 24 October 2024. The couple offered to drop the case if the government passed a civil partnership bill, but the government refused. On October 27, 2025, the Court of Appeal ruled that the government must interpret the term "spouse" in the Immigration Act to include same-sex partners legally married in other jurisdictions, finding that it could not discriminate based on sexual orientation. This was the first time the courts had found an obligation to recognize same-sex partners.

In February 2026, LGBT group Colours Caribbean called on the government and Governor Dileeni Daniel-Selvaratnam to pass legislation legally recognizing same-sex couples.

== Religious performance ==
The Catholic Church, which accounts for about 11% of the population, opposes same-sex marriage and does not allow its priests to officiate at such marriages. In December 2023, the Holy See published Fiducia supplicans, a declaration allowing Catholic priests to bless couples who are not considered to be married according to church teaching, including the blessing of same-sex couples. Donald Chambers, the General Secretary of the Antilles Episcopal Conference, said in response that: "The spontaneous blessings are simply gestures that provide an effective means of increasing trust in God on the part of the person who asks. Hence the title, Fiducia supplicans literally means asking for trust." The Church in the Province of the West Indies, part of the Anglican Communion, also opposes same-sex marriage. Following the Church of England's decision to allow clergy to bless same-sex civil marriages in 2023, the Church in the Province of the West Indies issued a statement reaffirming marriage as a "creation ordinance, a gift of God in creation and a means of His grace. Marriage, defined as a faithful, committed, permanent and legally sanctioned relationship between a man and a woman, is central to the stability and health of human society. It continues to provide the best context for the raising of children." Further, it described same-sex marriage as "totally unacceptable on theological and cultural grounds". Bishop Laish Boyd had already stated in 2013 that in the Diocese of the Bahamas and the Turks and Caicos Islands "marriage is between males and females".

== See also ==
- LGBTQ rights in the Turks and Caicos Islands
- Recognition of same-sex unions in the Americas
- Same-sex marriage in the United Kingdom
- Recognition of same-sex unions in the British Overseas Territories
- Same-sex union court cases
