= Same-sex marriage in the Pitcairn Islands =

Same-sex marriage has been legal in the Pitcairn Islands since 14 May 2015. An ordinance to permit same-sex marriages was passed 7–0 by the Island Council on 1 April 2015. It received royal assent by Governor Jonathan Sinclair on 5 May, and entered into force on 14 May. None of the c. 50 Pitcairn Islanders residing on the island is known to be in a same-sex relationship. The Pitcairn Islands was the fourth British Overseas Territory to legalise same-sex marriage after South Georgia and the South Sandwich Islands, Akrotiri and Dhekelia and the British Indian Ocean Territory.

== Background ==
Recognition of same-sex relationships in Oceania Marriage Marriages performed elsewhere are recognized (American Samoa) No recognition of same-sex couples Constitution limits marriage to opposite-sex couples (Palau, Tuvalu) Same-sex sexual activity illegal, but criminalisation not enforced Same-sex sexual activity illegal (Country names will appear with mouse-overs when map is viewed at full size. Encircling lines are the exclusive economic zones of each state.)

The Pitcairn Islands was settled by British mutineers from HMS Bounty, along with the Tahitian men and women who were with them, in 1790. The islands were rediscovered by the British in 1814 when Captain Thomas Staines made contact with the islanders. Pitcairn Island became a British colony in 1838, and Henderson, Ducie and Oeno were annexed by the British Empire in 1902. In 1938, all four islands were incorporated into a single administrative unit.

In common law, a marriage between persons of the same sex was void ab initio. In 1866, in Hyde v Hyde and Woodmansee (a case of polygamy), Lord Penzance's judgment began: "Marriage as understood in Christendom is the voluntary union for life of one man and one woman, to the exclusion of all others." Explicit bans on same-sex marriages were enacted in England and Wales in the Nullity of Marriage Act 1971, and later the Matrimonial Causes Act 1973. Similar laws were passed in Scotland and Northern Ireland. These bans, since repealed, did not apply to the Pitcairn Islands. The first four local ordinances having application solely to the islands were passed in 1952. One of these ordinances provided for the basis of the islands' legal system, administration and government. Two other ordinances provided for the registration of births and deaths, and for the solemnisation of marriages. The Marriage Ordinance, enacted on 16 October 1952, did not contain an explicit ban on same-sex marriage, but generally assumed married spouses to be "husband and wife". In March 2014, same-sex marriage was legalised in England and Wales with the enactment of the Marriage (Same Sex Couples) Act 2013, but this law does not apply to the territory.

== Same-sex marriage law ==
On 1 April 2015, the Island Council passed the Same Sex Marriage and Civil Partnerships Ordinance by a unanimous 7–0 vote. The ordinance, supported by Mayor Shawn Christian and Deputy Mayor Brenda Christian, amended the local Marriage Ordinance to replace references to "husband and wife" with gender-neutral language and to add the following definition of marriage:

Marriage means the union of two people regardless of their sex, sexual orientation or gender identity.

The Interpretation and General Clauses Ordinance was amended to state that "'marriage' – (a) includes marriage of a same-sex couple, and (b) includes a registered civil partnership that is entered into outside of Pitcairn in accordance with the laws of that place" and "'spouse' – (a) includes a person who is married to a person of the same sex, and (b) unless otherwise specified includes a person who is a party to a registered civil partnership that is entered into outside of Pitcairn in accordance with the laws of that place". Civil partnerships (Pitkern: sivil paatneshep, pronounced [ˈsɪwəl pɑːtˈnɛʃeʔp]) cannot be performed in the Pitcairn Islands but those performed abroad are recognised as marriages on the islands. The ordinance was given royal assent by Governor Jonathan Sinclair on 5 May. It was published on 13 May 2015, and came into effect the following day. Both intending spouses must be 18 years or older, and one of the parties must have resided in the Pitcairn Islands for at least the past fifteen days. The marriage license is issued by the Registrar of Marriages, and the marriage ceremony must take place within three months of the notice of marriage. The move to legalise same-sex marriage was widely published on international media. Deputy Governor Kevin Lynch said that the change had been suggested by British authorities. Local resident Meralda Warren said the law "wasn't even a major point of discussion until the outside world began catching up on the news". None of the c. 50 Pitcairn Islanders residing on the island is known to be in a same-sex relationship.

== Religious performance ==
The only church building in the Pitcairn Islands is a Seventh-day Adventist church, located in Adamstown. This global denomination holds that "marriage is a lawfully binding lifelong commitment between a man and a woman." Media outlets reported that any potential religious same-sex wedding ceremony would "encounter difficulties as the only preacher on the island is a Seventh-Day Adventist".

== See also ==
- LGBTQ rights in the Pitcairn Islands
- Same-sex marriage in the United Kingdom
- Recognition of same-sex unions in the British Overseas Territories
- Recognition of same-sex unions in Oceania
