= Felix Alvarez =

Gibraltarian lobbyist

Felix Alvarez OBE
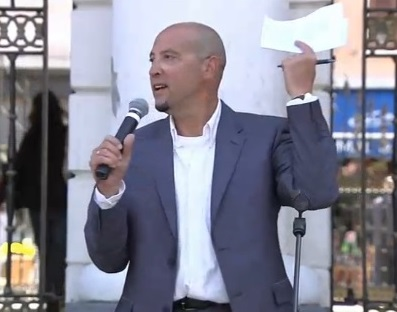
- Born: Felix Alvarez; 11 October 1951 (age 75); Gibraltar
- Education: Goldsmiths, University of London
- Occupation: activist
- Known for: Founder of the Equality Rights Group
- Parent(s): Felix Alvarez; Laura Parody
- Relatives: Emilio Alvarez

Felix Alvarez OBE (11 October 1951) is a Gibraltarian human, civil rights, democracy and LGBT activist.

== Early life ==
Felix Alvarez was born at Old St. Bernard's Hospital, Gibraltar, to Felix and Laura Alvarez (née Parody). As a young boy, he attended St. Anne's Middle School in Gibraltar. Alvarez's maternal grandfather was cousin to Emilio Alvarez, founding member of the Association for the Advancement of Civil Rights (AACR), a political party instrumental in granting the Gibraltarians greater civil rights.

Alvarez's family moved to London in 1959, living first near the Dalston/Hoxton area of the East End of London but spending the majority of his life in the South London areas of Clapham and Tulse Hill. Alvarez grew up bilingual in English and Spanish as do most Gibraltarians. Yet the experience of being "foreign" in 1960s London was not easy for him or his family. He has vivid memories of tobacconist notice boards full of accommodation "to let" signs saying "no coloureds or dogs".

The experience of being different in an unaccepting society alerted him from an early age to the situation of the marginalised. As a teenager, Alvarez attended Wandsworth Comprehensive School, a progressive post-grammar school model, famous for its choir and close work with Benjamin Britten. It was during this period of his formative teenage years that, through personal contact, Alvarez joined Peter Hain in his Anti-Apartheid campaigns, work which he continued later at university as a young student in the early 1970s.

== LGBT rights ==
=== In London ===
Returning to London after 3 years in a northern university, Alvarez discovered the Gay Liberation Front (GLF), recently imported from the Stonewall riots of New York in the late 1960s. Becoming immediately involved in its activities, Alvarez was one of the founders of Britain's first Gay Community Centres, where pioneering work was undertaken to establish phone counselling, information and advice, and weekly community meetings to raise self-esteem and channel gay and lesbian anger towards change rather than towards self-damage. At this time, Felix Alvarez worked with the Lambeth Community Law Centre and the Brixton Housing Advice Centre in Railton Road.

Alvarez went on to qualify in community and social work at Goldsmiths, University of London in 1978. Disillusioned with the downturn of fascist trends in London (with the rise of the British National Front), Alvarez took up the possibility of work in the Middle East, on what he considered to be an adventure, for 6 months. The adventure lasted 16 years, during which time Alvarez learnt Arabic and travelled the world.

=== In Gibraltar ===
In 1997, Alvarez returned to Gibraltar. One of his first undertakings on The Rock was to produce an in-depth study and MA thesis on bilingualism in the Gibraltar educational system from nursery schools all the way through to adult vocational training. This was entitled Primary Code and Private Space: Choice in the Host Classroom. A copy was deposited with the John Mackintosh Hall and has become a reference point for international researchers regarding the impact of bilingualism in a community. The research contained implications for Gibraltar's educational policies which, to date, have not been taken note of.

Experiencing difficulties as a result of insurmountable bureaucracy and prejudice regarding his non-EU same-sex partner, Alvarez determined to start challenging discrimination of sexual minorities in Gibraltar. By this time Deputy Leader of a political party (the now defunct Independent Liberal Forum (ILF)), he persuaded his party to back him in the establishment of what was to be known as Gib Gay Rights (GGR). In a GBC television news broadcast on 4 September 2000, Alvarez announced that "the fear factor" was over as far as gay citizens were concerned. From then on, gay citizens would be demanding equal rights as full citizens of Gibraltar. As the work of the group expanded over the years, GGR has since become Gibraltar's foremost Human & Civil Rights organisation, and is currently known as Equality Rights Group (GGR). This is often abbreviated to ERG or ERG-GGR.

Under his Chairmanship, ERG has achieved important changes in Gibraltarian society, prompting important debate on a range of social political issues, but in particular the following:

- Connected Health: In a joint Report with drugs rehabilitation group Stay Clean, groundbreaking proposals for restructuring not only the institutions, but also the approach, policy and legislative frameworks for dealing with a long-standing drugs problem and increasing sexual health issues in Gibraltar. Alvarez has argued that the War on Drugs paradigm has merely fed the criminals and grown the problem of substance abuse. He argues for a regulatory framework instead, thereby advocating that currently illicit drugs (whether for recreational or medicinal use) be regulated and supplied by Government authorities and caring professionals. The evident connections between drugs and sexual health, while not always implied in co-morbidity, do interact within the paradigm necessary to destigmatise, humanise and give adequate responses to individuals.
- Media: Gibraltar media outlets are few - but important to the public interest of Gibraltar's young democracy. The problem is that, being such a small marketplace, neither newspapers nor the State TV/radio stations in the territory can hope to survive economically without fundamental and substantial financial support from the Gibraltar Government. 'And that's a HUGE problem for Democracy!' says Alvarez. Advocating a re-think on the structuring of media outlets, Alvarez argues for a new scheme whereby outlets are guaranteed funding - yet are fully protected from political influence or interference 'so that the media workers themselves as well as the outlets can breathe freely and do the professional job they're supposed to of acting with independence not deference to those in power.' Alvarez recognises this to be one of the hardest nuts to crack - especially since advocating change in this respect faces a wall of resistance from the politicians and Political Parties, but also from the Managements of media outlets themselves. In a situation where media workers have no specific union representation (or may fear acknowledging it to their employers), the reality of the challenges do not escape Alvarez or those who work with him towards a freer Gibraltar.
- Civil Society: The development of a Civil Society identity and awareness is one of the most fundamental and crucial tasks facing the Equality Rights Group, and a centrepiece of Alvarez's vision. 'Without an independent Civil Society, we're stuck and stagnant in our development,' adds Felix Alvarez. 'We can have a separate Judiciary, Legislature and Executive - but that's NOT the Rule of Law; a number of States have those three basic elements, yet Civil Society is intimidated - or worse still, locked up! Without a vital and vibrant Civil Society that knows the meaning of solidarity between its various elements, Democracy fails its potential. That's why we started the Independent Civil Society Awards event in 2013. It originated from our marking of International Day Against Homophobia each 17 May, and developed from there; so that now, IDAHO is part of the larger move towards solidarity with all of Civil Society in Gibraltar.'
- An ongoing social education and awareness campaign through the media and political action which has seen a significant shift in public opinion in Gibraltar on issues affecting same-sex relations. So much so that neither silence nor taboo can any longer be said to describe the situation in Gibraltar on gay issues.
- From a position where no politician or political party addressed gay rights, today the majority of politicians and political parties in Gibraltar have clear and positive pro-gay rights policies and stances. The ruling Gibraltar Social Democrats are now in a minority by not having clear pro policies.
- The establishment of strong and important ties with organisations and high-profile politicians both at Westminster and Brussels
- A campaign to pressure the Government of Gibraltar to introduce an EU directive introducing sexual orientation anti-discrimination provisions in employment law. In Gibraltar, this was introduced as the Equal Opportunities Act.
- A campaign to equalise the gay age of consent. This having been successfully brought before British Prime Minister Gordon Brown. Following a Declaration by the Supreme Court of Gibraltar as a result of the matter being contested by ERG, the Gibraltar Parliament equalised the age of consent for all at 16 in 2011.
- A successful campaign to end discrimination against same-sex couples in the area of joint tenancy rights in Government housing.
- Supported action leading to the obtainment of adoption rights for same-sex couples in Gibraltar.
- Civil Partnership legislation: after 14 years of campaign, Alvarez finally succeeded in bringing civil partnership to Gibraltar when, on 21 March 2014, the Gibraltar Parliament approved the Civil Partnership Act 2014. In contrast to UK CP legislation, Gibraltar made the law applicable to all couples regardless of gender or sexual orientation (which means that heterosexual couples have equal access to the CP status); additionally, same-sex adoption rights are also enshrined within the law, thus formalising what was an already-standing prior judicial decision.
- The first Civil Partnership ceremony was celebrated on 27 May 2014, opening opportunities for both same-sex and opposite-sex partners to enter into binding unions recognised in Gibraltar law.
- Following several years of campaigning for the introduction of legal protections for minors in the area of sexual abuse, and a demand for a Sex Offenders Register to be brought into Gibraltar law, Parliament approved provisions under a new Crime Act which took effect in 2012 and which now offers full protection and establishes a Register.
- The annual celebration of International Day Against Homophobia (IDAHO) in Gibraltar since 2012. The 2013 IDAHO was attended by the full political and institutional elite of Gibraltar: the Chief Minister and Ministers of Government, the Governor of Gibraltar, members of the Parliamentary Opposition, the Mayor of Gibraltar, the non-Parliamentary political parties, representatives of the various Unions in Gibraltar, as well as the Commissioner of Police and the Head of the Gibraltar Fire Brigade. As the Chief Minister of Gibraltar said on that occasion 'today here at IDAHO, all Constitutional players are present!'
- The celebration of Pride Day in Gibraltar. The first such celebration was held on 15 June 2013 and is set to grow in importance. The key difference in Gibraltar's Pride is that it is specifically NOT limited to gay Pride. In line with Alvarez's view of equality and civil and human rights as an indivisible spectrum of human justice and endeavour, Alvarez clearly set a framework for the community at large to jointly celebrate, favouring thus the avoidance of isolation or ghettoisation of any specific sector of the community and encouraging social solidarity. The first Official Pride event (fully supported and sponsored by the Government of Gibraltar)was approved for celebration in July 2014.
- The establishment of an annual Award recognising significant contributions to Human & Civil Rights in Gibraltar. The first award was presented in May 2013, with Barrister John Restano of law firm Hassan's being recognised for his landmark collaborative work with ERG on breakthrough litigation which saw the ending of discrimination against same-sex couples by Government in the area of joint tenancy rights in public housing, the equalisation of the age of consent, and the obtainment of adoption rights for same-sex couples.
- The call for the People of Gibraltar's history to be recognised by the UK Government through consideration of an appropriate Honours Award.

Alvarez's vision has always been the establishment of comprehensive links across other areas of discrimination – whether disability, age, children's rights or any other area of social concern. This was clear from the start, even before his setting up of GGR, when he actively held meetings with lawyers and other individuals to create interest in the setting up of a Gibraltar branch of British human rights organisation Liberty. Whilst that project did not prosper, Alvarez's vision has been comprehensive and unitary throughout. This has meant that GGR now considers itself a gay and human rights organisation. "Not only is a position of only fighting one's own corner fundamentally flawed from a human rights perspective,' says Alvarez, 'since human rights are indivisible in and of themselves, the issue of multiple discrimination is a very real one and no one can convince me, for example, that there are no gay people who are not disabled, nor of different ethnicities or migrant status, nor any other variety of elements. For the simple reason that human beings do not come in neat and exclusive packages: we are diverse. To lose sight of that is to lose sight of the core of what working in human rights is all about!'.

Alvarez continues to steer the development of human and civil rights in Gibraltar - to include the rights of sexual minorities without exception. To do so, and in addition to his already strong academic background (a B.A. and M.A. as well as qualifications in social and community work, in addition to in the teaching of English as a Second or Other Language) he undertook a law degree (LLB).

Committed to widening democracy, Alvarez continues to seek means by which more open and participative involvement of citizens concerned for human and civil rights can be furthered in the community of Gibraltar. In this, he says, 'my mind is constantly employed to avoid the possibility of satisfaction at what we have and what we have achieved - and to remain open at all times to change and improvement. Even if that should mean my being asked to leave at some point. It's the way it has to be! Clinging whether to power or to anything else is not the key to a dignified life whether at an individual or collective level!'

Alvarez's Honouring Gibraltar campaign:

Encompassing his vision of 'Rights for people - as well as The People', Alvarez has put forward a vision for Gibraltar which recognises the interconnection between Gibraltar's on-going political struggle for self-determination and identity and the applicability of a just society based on human and civil rights.

== Awards ==
Alvarez was appointed an Officer of the Most Excellent Order of the British Empire for services to the advancement of equality and human rights in Gibraltar in the 2013 Queen's Birthday Honours.

The OBE investiture by Her Majesty Queen Elizabeth II at Buckingham Palace took place on 10 October 2013.

Alvarez was also awarded the Gulf War Medal in late 1991 for his civilian services at the time of the first Gulf War in Iraq.

Desert Storm started the day I was supposed to fly back from Heathrow to Saudi Arabia, and I'd been told I'd be on double pay for the duration of the war! But I couldn't do it. I couldn't just sit back comfortably and watch CNN's Amanpour reporting from where I worked, and just 'enjoy' watching the Scud missiles. Places and people I knew and cared for were stuck there. And I knew my placeI was to be there with them. It was something I felt inside as 'no option'. So I asked (against all advice) to be flown back the only way that was possible at that time on a military aircraft plane full of British soldiers taking little white pills and politely refusing an invitation to take them too. Those pills were later to be implicated in a secret military experiment that, it appears, led to Gulf War Syndrome. All this was just one face of the pitiful surrealism of war.

== See also ==
- List of Gibraltarians
- LGBT rights in Gibraltar
