= Recognition of same-sex unions in the British Overseas Territories =

Marriage Marriage for expat personnel and dependents only British sovereignty not recognized internationally Civil union Limited domestic recognition Unrecognized A Isle of Man; B Guernsey; C Jersey; 1 United Kingdom; 2 Gibraltar; 3 Akrotiri and Dhekelia; 4 Bermuda; 5 Turks and Caicos Islands; 6 British Virgin Islands; 7 Anguilla; 8 Cayman Islands; 9 Montserrat; 10 Pitcairn Islands; 11 Saint Helena, Ascension and Tristan da Cunha; 12 British Indian Ocean Territory; 13 Falkland Islands; 14 South Georgia and the South Sandwich Islands; (15) British Antarctic Territory

Among the fourteen British Overseas Territories, eight – Akrotiri and Dhekelia, the British Antarctic Territory, the British Indian Ocean Territory, the Falkland Islands, Gibraltar, the Pitcairn Islands, Saint Helena, Ascension and Tristan da Cunha, and South Georgia and the South Sandwich Islands – recognise and perform same-sex marriages. In the Sovereign Base Areas of Akrotiri and Dhekelia, only British military and civilian personnel can enter into same-sex marriages and civil partnerships.

The five Caribbean territories do not recognise same-sex unions. Three specify the right of opposite-sex couples to marry in their constitutions, though they have no laws prohibiting same-sex marriage. Same-sex civil partnerships are performed in the Cayman Islands and Bermuda.

== United Kingdom government ==
The UK Government retains the right to impose same-sex marriage on territories that do not recognise the unions, as it did through an Order in Council to decriminalise homosexuality in recalcitrant territories in 2001. In February 2019, the Foreign Affairs Select Committee recommended that the UK Government impose a deadline on territories to legalise same-sex marriage and, if that deadline is not met, intervene through legislation or an Order in Council. The May Government later rejected this recommendation in a statement to parliament.

In July 2022, Labour Party Peer Lord Michael Cashman introduced a private member's bill in the House of Lords that would compel governors of each of the six British Overseas Territories where same-sex marriage is not currently legal (Anguilla, Bermuda, British Virgin Islands, Cayman Islands, Montserrat, and Turks and Caicos) to pass laws legalizing it. The territories are also bound by the European Convention on Human Rights to pass laws legalizing some form of same-sex union, although to date only Bermuda and Cayman Islands have done so.

== Recognition per territory ==
Flag	Name	Location	Comments
Same-sex marriage
	Akrotiri and Dhekelia	Cyprus, Mediterranean Sea	Same-sex marriage has been legal in the Sovereign Base Areas for UK military personnel since 3 June 2014. Civil partnerships have been allowed for military personnel since 7 December 2005.
	British Antarctic Territory	Antarctica	An ordinance allowing same-sex marriage was proclaimed by the Commissioner Peter Hayes on 13 October 2016 and took effect forthwith.
	British Indian Ocean Territory	Indian Ocean	Same-sex marriage has been legal in the British Indian Ocean Territory since 3 June 2014. An ordinance to legalise such marriages was approved by the Privy Council of the United Kingdom on 28 April 2014.
	Falkland Islands	South Atlantic Ocean	On 30 March 2017, the Legislative Assembly of the Falkland Islands approved the Marriage (Amendment) Bill 2017 by a vote of 7 to 1. It became law on 13 April 2017.
	Gibraltar	Iberian Peninsula, Continental Europe	In January 2014, the Civil Partnership Bill 2014 was published for community consultation and headed for the introduction to the Gibraltar Parliament. On 21 March, the bill was approved by the parliament with no noticeable opposition. The bill was given Royal Assent on 25 March. The law and related rules and regulations took effect on 28 March. The law also allows adoption of children by couples in a civil partnership, as mandated by the 2013 Court ruling. On 26 October 2016, the Civil Marriage Amendment Bill 2016 was passed unanimously in the Gibraltar Parliament, thus legalising same-sex marriage. The bill received Royal Assent on 1 November 2016, and came into force on 15 December 2016.
	Pitcairn Islands	Pacific Ocean	Same-sex marriage has been legal on the Pitcairn Islands since 14 May 2015 after being unanimously passed by the Pitcairn Island Council on 1 April 2015.
	Saint Helena	South Atlantic Ocean	Same-sex marriage is legal on all three islands. An ordinance to this effect was approved unanimously by the Ascension Island Council on 31 May 2016. It was signed by the Governor and published in the official gazette on 20 June. On 23 December 2016, the Governor issued an order to commence the law on 1 January 2017. On 23 February 2017, after consultation with the Governor of Saint Helena, the Tristan da Cunha Island Council agreed that a law to legalise same-sex marriage would go forward formally for adoption. An ordinance extending the Ascension Island same-sex marriage law to Tristan da Cunha went into effect on 4 August 2017 after being published in the government gazette on the same day. In January 2017, a same-sex couple applied to get married in Saint Helena. The registrar was in the process of obtaining legal advice as to how to proceed (the existing 1851 marriage ordinance is unclear on same-sex marriage) when two members of the public filed caveats (objections) to the marriage notice. Subsequently, the registrar referred the issue to the chief justice for a decision. A preliminary hearing took place in the Supreme Court on 23 February 2017. The newly elected legislative council began public consultations on reintroducing the withdrawn 2016 equal marriage bill in October 2017. On 19 December 2017, the legislative council passed the same-sex marriage bill on a 9–2 vote. The governor signed the bill into law on 20 December 2017.
	Ascension	South Atlantic Ocean	
	Tristan da Cunha	South Atlantic Ocean	
	South Georgia and the South Sandwich Islands	South Atlantic Ocean	Same sex marriage has been legal in South Georgia and the South Sandwich Islands since 2014.
Other type of union
	Bermuda	North Atlantic Ocean	On 5 May 2017, the Supreme Court of Bermuda issued a ruling legalising same-sex marriage. In December 2017, the legislature passed the Domestic Partnerships Act 2018, replacing same-sex marriage with domestic partnerships. The law received royal assent on 7 February 2018 and went into effect on 1 June 2018. On 6 June 2018, in response to two lawsuits filed by LGBT rights activists, the Supreme Court revoked the parts of the law which banned same-sex marriages. The ruling was stayed pending appeal, which the government lost in the Court of Appeal on 23 November 2018. The government appealed the decision to the Privy Council, which heard its case on 3–4 February 2021. On 14 March 2022 the Judicial Committee of the Privy Council ruled against the Court of Appeal, banning same-sex marriage once again. In July 2022, laws were passed within Bermuda to retrospectively backdate same-sex marriage legality formally prior to March 2022.
	Cayman Islands	Caribbean, North Atlantic Ocean	Same-sex civil partnerships became legal upon enactment of the Civil Partnership Act by the Governor, using his reserve powers, on 4 September 2020. Civil Partnerships are considered functionally equivalent to marriage, including adoption and inheritance rights. On 14 March 2022 the Judicial Committee of the Privy Council rejected a civil suit seeking legalisation of same-sex marriage.
No recognition
	Anguilla	Caribbean, North Atlantic Ocean	Anguilla does not recognise same-sex unions, though commitment ceremonies are performed on the island.
	British Virgin Islands	Caribbean, North Atlantic Ocean	Public officials in the British Virgin Islands have declared that same-sex marriage is illegal there, though it is not prohibited under British Virgin Islands law. The British Virgin Islands have an extremely religious society, and no discussion relating to legalisation has yet occurred in the House of Assembly. Church leaders have indicated hostility towards the possibility of legalisation, and political leaders have taken an unsympathetic approach in public. The British Government has confirmed that it will not impose recognition of same-sex marriages in the British Virgin Islands by way of Order-in-Council. The Constitution does, however, prohibit discrimination against people on the basis of sexual orientation.
	Montserrat	Caribbean, North Atlantic Ocean	Montserrat does not recognise same-sex unions. Article 10(1) of the Constitution reads: Notwithstanding anything in section 16, every man and woman of marriageable age (as determined by or under any law) has the right to marry a person of the opposite sex and to found a family.
	Turks and Caicos Islands	Caribbean, North Atlantic Ocean	The Turks and Caicos Islands do not recognise same-sex unions. Article 10 of the Constitution reads: Every unmarried man and woman of marriageable age (as determined by or under any law) has the right to marry a person of the opposite sex and found a family.

== See also ==
- Same-sex marriage in the United Kingdom
- Civil partnership in the United Kingdom
- LGBTQ rights in the United Kingdom (Overseas Territories)
- Same-sex marriage in Jersey
- Same-sex marriage in the Isle of Man
- Same-sex marriage in Guernsey
