= Rodriguez v Minister of Housing =

- Court: Judicial Committee of the Privy Council
- Full case name: Nadine Rodriguez, Appellant v (1) Minister of Housing of the Government (2) The Housing Allocation Committee, Respondents
- Decided: 14 December 2009
- Citations: [2009] UKPC 52, 28 BHRC 189, [2010] UKHRR 144

Case history
- Prior action: Court of Appeal of Gibraltar

Case opinions
- Lady Hale

Rodriguez v Minister of Housing is a 2009 Judicial Committee of the Privy Council (JCPC) case that held that it was unconstitutional for the government of Gibraltar to turn down an application for joint tenancy in government housing to a same-sex couple.

Nadine Rodriguez and her unmarried female partner of 21 years applied to the Housing Allocation Committee for approval of a joint tenancy in government-owned housing. The Committee had a policy of only approving joint tenancies in cases where a couple were married or were unmarried partners with a child in common. Rodriguez and her partner's application was turned down because they did not meet the criteria. The Court of Appeal of Gibraltar held that the policy was not unconstitutionally discriminatory.

The JCPC held that the government's policy was discriminatory and thereby violated the Constitution of Gibraltar. The discriminatory impact was greater upon same-sex partners than other unmarried couples since same-sex partners were prohibited from marrying and cannot have biological children in common.

The JCPC rejected Gibraltar's argument that the policy protected marriage and children, because denying benefits to those who cannot marry does not protect those who can. The JCPC emphasised that the decision did not mean that Gibraltar was obliged to introduce same-sex marriage or same-sex civil partnerships.
