= Jonathan Sinclair =

British diplomat (born 1970)

Jonathan Sinclair LVO
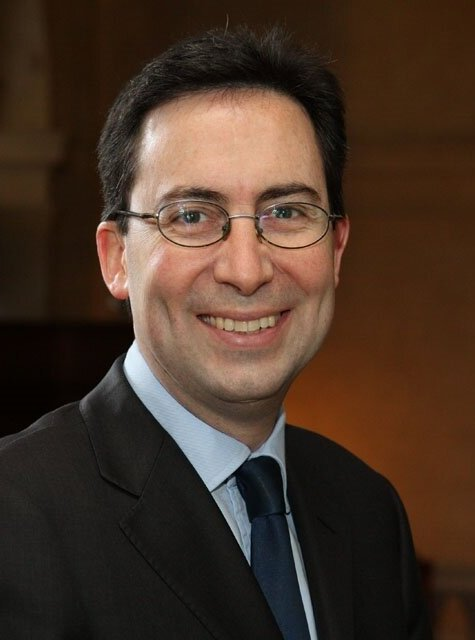

Director, Human Resources, Foreign and Commonwealth Office
- In office October 2018 – Feb 2021
- Preceded by: Jill Gallard

Principal Private Secretary to the Secretary of State for Foreign and Commonwealth Affairs
- In office January 2018 – October 2018
- Preceded by: Martin Reynolds
- Succeeded by: Serena Stone

Personal details
- Born: 13 October 1970 (age 55) Victoria, Seychelles
- Spouse: Helen Sinclair
- Children: 3
- Occupation: Diplomat

Jonathan William Rossiter Sinclair LVO (born 13 October 1970) is a British diplomat who was Director of Human Resources at the Foreign and Commonwealth Office, from October 2018 to February 2021.

== Career ==
Sinclair was educated at Radley College and studied at Oxford University for a BA degree in PPE and at Johns Hopkins University for a Master's degree in International Relations. After short stints in media and tourism he joined the Foreign and Commonwealth Office in 1996. He was a Private Secretary to the Foreign Secretary (then Jack Straw) 2002–04, and head of the political team at the British embassy in Washington, D.C., 2005–09. He was High Commissioner to New Zealand, non-resident High Commissioner to Samoa, and non-resident Governor of the Pitcairn, Henderson, Ducie and Oeno Islands 2014–18.

Sinclair was appointed LVO in 2007 following a state visit by The Queen to the United States.

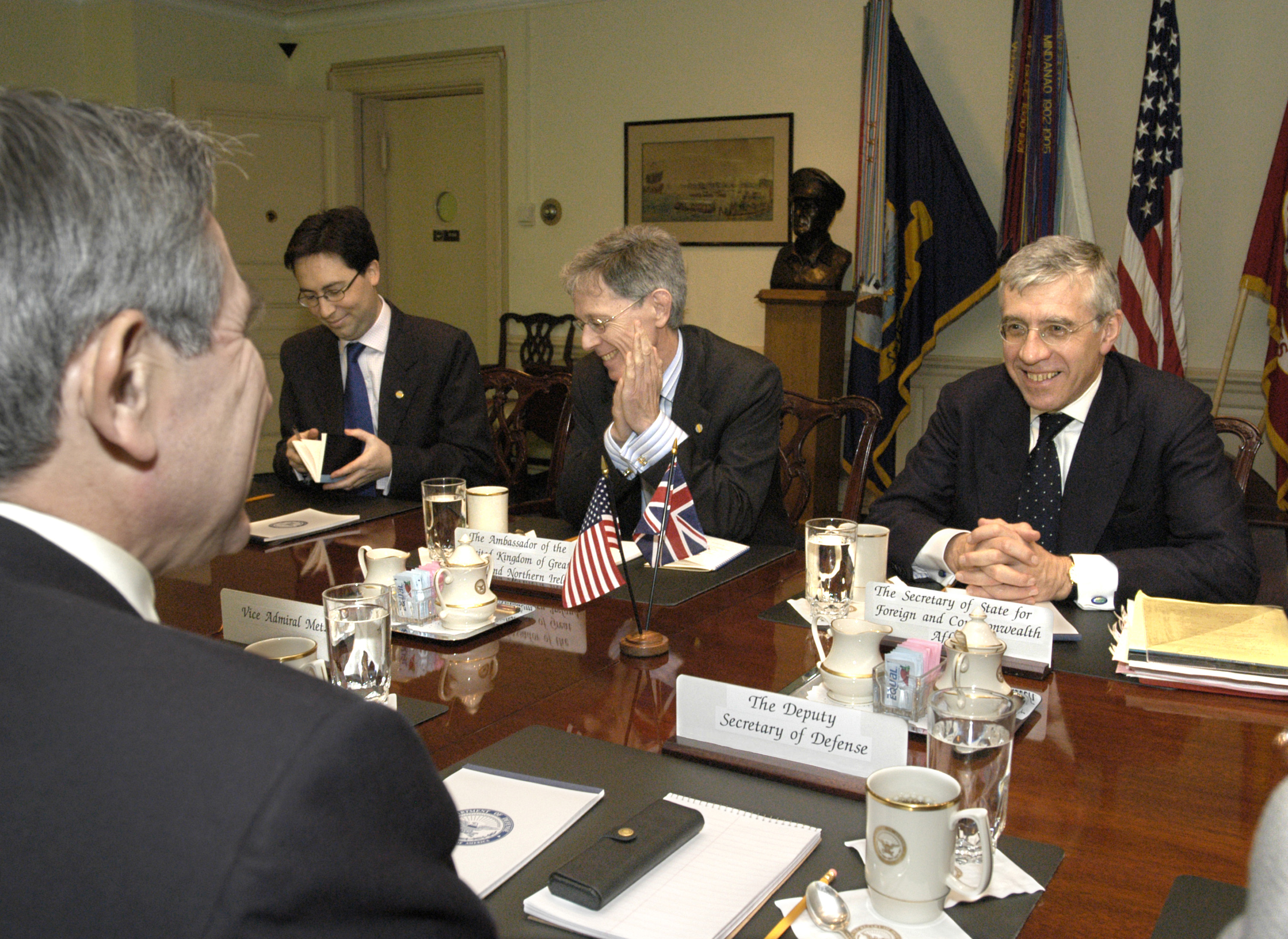
Sinclair (left) with Sir David Manning (centre) and Jack Straw (right) in 2003.
