= Nullity of Marriage Act 1971 =

Act of the Parliament of the United Kingdom

Nullity of Marriage Act 1971 (Note: Section 7(1).)
- Act of Parliament
- Parliament of the United Kingdom
- Long title: An Act to restate, with certain alterations, the grounds on which a marriage is void or voidable and the bars to the grant of a decree of nullity on the ground that a marriage is voidable; to alter the effect of decrees of nullity in respect of voidable marriages; and to abolish certain remaining bars to the grant of matrimonial relief.
- Citation: 1971 c. 44
- Territorial extent: England and Wales (Note: Section 7(6).)

Dates
- Royal assent: 1 July 1971
- Commencement: 1 August 1971 (Note: Section 7(5).)
- Repealed: 1 January 1974 (Note: The Matrimonial Causes Act 1973 (Commencement) Order 1973 (SI 1973/1972).)
Other legislation
| Amends | Matrimonial Causes Act 1965 |
| Repealed by | Matrimonial Causes Act 1973 |

Status: Repealed

Text of statute as originally enacted

The Nullity of Marriage Act 1971 (c. 44) was an act of the Parliament of the United Kingdom that defined valid reasons for annulment according to British law. This act was the first time in British law that marriage was explicitly defined by statute as being between a male and a female. A marriage could therefore be annulled if the partners were not respectively male and female.

The provisions of the act were incorporated into the Matrimonial Causes Act 1973 and the act itself was repealed. The provision that a marriage must be between a male and a female has subsequently been overturned by the Marriage (Same Sex Couples) Act 2013.

== Contents ==
The first clause of the act states that lack of consent in a marriage due to mental health problems, duress, or a mistake in getting married were grounds for a marriage to be void. The second clause stated that, if the partners getting married were not male and female, then the marriage was void. The third clause states that epilepsy attacks at the time of marriage was no longer a valid reason for annulment. The act only applied to marriages if there had been a marriage ceremony. The act came into force on 1 August 1971.

== Subsequent developments ==
The whole act was repealed by section 54(1)(b) of, and schedule 3, to the Matrimonial Causes Act 1973, which came into force on 1 January 1974.

== See also ==
- Same-sex marriage in the United Kingdom
- Marriage in the United Kingdom
