= Same-sex marriage in South Georgia and the South Sandwich Islands =

Same-sex marriage has been legal in South Georgia and the South Sandwich Islands since 13 March 2014, in accordance with the law in force in England and Wales, although the Foreign and Commonwealth Office only updated its travel advice website page to include a note about it in January 2018. South Georgia and the South Sandwich Islands, despite having no permanent population, was the first British Overseas Territory to recognise same-sex marriage.

== Background ==
South Georgia was claimed by Captain James Cook for the Kingdom of Great Britain in 1775. In 1908, the United Kingdom established constitutional arrangements of its possession of South Georgia and formally annexed the South Sandwich Islands. The islands were governed as Falkland Islands Dependencies. South Georgia and the South Sandwich Islands ceased to be administered as a Falkland Islands dependency and became its own separate territory with the enactment of the South Georgia and South Sandwich Islands Order 1985 by the Privy Council in 1985. The Order provides for a Commissioner, who has the authority to make laws in the territory; primary legislation known as "ordinances" and secondary legislation known as "orders and regulations". The Government of the United Kingdom may also enact laws that are directly applicable to the territory, generally regarding matters of international relations. Concerning matters not covered by local legislation or directly applied UK legislation, then, in accordance with the Interpretation and General Clauses Ordinance 1977, the law in force in England and Wales shall be in force in South Georgia and the South Sandwich Islands "in so far as the circumstances permit and provided they are not inconsistent with or repugnant to any Ordinance or Order in Council".

The Marriage Ordinance 1949, applying to both the Falkland Islands and South Georgia and the South Sandwich Islands, was enacted on 31 December 1949. The ordinance provides for the issuance of marriage licenses and empowers the Governor of the Falkland Islands (now the Commissioner for South Georgia and the South Sandwich Islands) to appoint registrars to conduct the marriage ceremony. Article 3 of the ordinance states:

Every marriage (1) which by the law of England would be valid; [...] shall be good and valid to all intents and purposes.

The ordinance does not explicitly ban same-sex marriage, and uses gender-neutral language with regard to married spouses. The marriage forms provided for by the ordinance do not require the names of the "bride" and the "groom" rather the names of both "parties". Further, it does not define the term "marriage". Nonetheless, a marriage between persons of the same sex was considered void ab initio in common law, and as such same-sex couples could not marry on the islands. The ordinance was repealed in the Falkland Islands in 1996, but remains in force in South Georgia and the South Sandwich Islands.

== Same-sex marriage law ==
On 17 July 2013, Queen Elizabeth II granted royal assent to the Marriage (Same Sex Couples) Act 2013, which legalised same-sex marriage in England and Wales. Schedule 3 of the act states that "In existing England and Wales legislation— (a) a reference to marriage is to be read as including a reference to marriage of a same sex couple; (b) a reference to a married couple is to be read as including a reference to a married same sex couple; and (c) a reference to a person who is married is to be read as including a reference to a person who is married to a person of the same sex." The law went into effect on 13 March 2014, with the first same-sex marriage ceremonies in England occurring on 29 March 2014. As the Marriage Ordinance 1949 does not provide for a definition of marriage, all references to marriage and married spouses are deemed to apply to same-sex couples. The Foreign and Commonwealth Office only updated its travel advice website page to include a note about it in 2018, and confirmed that as of January 2018 no same-sex weddings had taken place in South Georgia and the South Sandwich Islands. Any marriage conducted in the territory is automatically recognised in the United Kingdom. The marriage ceremony must take place within three months of the issuance of the marriage license. On 13 February 2024, Commissioner Alison Blake assented the Marriage (Amendment) Ordinance 2024, which replaced some gender-specific language in the Marriage Ordinance and set a minimum marriageable age at 18. All marriages must be conducted in the vicinity of Grytviken, with the Norwegian Anglican Church being a popular location for ceremonies.

== Religious performance ==
The Norwegian Anglican Church in Grytviken is part of the Parish of the Falkland Islands. While the Church of England has allowed its clergy to bless—but not perform—same-sex marriages since 17 December 2023, it is unclear if a similar policy exists in the Parish of the Falkland Islands, an extra-provincial church in the Anglican Communion.

== See also ==
- Same-sex marriage in the United Kingdom
- Recognition of same-sex unions in the British Overseas Territories
- Recognition of same-sex unions in the Americas
