= Same-sex marriage in the British Indian Ocean Territory =

Same-sex marriage has been legal in the British Indian Ocean Territory since 3 June 2014. An Order in Council to legalise same-sex marriages was enacted by the Privy Council of the United Kingdom on 28 April 2014, and took effect on 3 June. The British Indian Ocean Territory, despite having no permanent population, was among the first British Overseas Territories to legalise same-sex marriage.

== Background ==
Laws regarding homosexuality in Asia Same-sex sexual activity legal Marriage performed Marriage recognized Other type of partnership Unregistered cohabitation No recognition of same-sex couples Ambiguous Restriction on freedom of expression, not enforced Severe restriction of association with arrests or detention Same-sex sexual activity illegal Prison, not enforced Prison Death penalty on books, not enforced Enforced death penalty

In 1965, the United Kingdom split the Chagos Archipelago from Mauritius to form the British Indian Ocean Territory. The islands had previously been governed as a dependency of British Mauritius from 1810. Between 1968 and 1973, British authorities forcibly removed the local Chagossian population from Diego Garcia, Peros Banhos and the Salomon Islands. In 1971, the UK signed a treaty with the United States, leasing the island of Diego Garcia to the U.S. Armed Forces for the purposes of building a large air and naval base on the island.

The laws of the territory are based on the British Indian Ocean Territory (Constitution) Order 2004, which gives the Commissioner for the British Indian Ocean Territory the authority to make laws in the territory. The Government of the United Kingdom may also enact laws that are directly applicable to the territory. Concerning matters not covered by local legislation or directly applied UK legislation, then, in accordance with the Courts Ordinance 1983, the law in force in England and Wales shall be in force in the British Indian Ocean Territory. In common law, a marriage between persons of the same sex was void ab initio. In 1866, in Hyde v Hyde and Woodmansee (a case of polygamy), Lord Penzance's judgment began: "Marriage as understood in Christendom is the voluntary union for life of one man and one woman, to the exclusion of all others." Explicit bans on same-sex marriages were enacted in England and Wales in the Nullity of Marriage Act 1971, and later the Matrimonial Causes Act 1973. Similar laws were passed in Scotland and Northern Ireland. These bans, since repealed, did not apply to the British Indian Ocean Territory.

All residents of the British Indian Ocean Territory are either members of the British or American armed forces or associated contractors assigned to the Naval Support Facility Diego Garcia. American soldiers are permitted to marry; however, United States Navy regulations prohibit any married couple from being stationed together on Diego Garcia, whether in a military or civilian capacity. Therefore, one member of the couple would be immediately reassigned.

== Same-sex marriage law ==
On 17 July 2013, Queen Elizabeth II granted royal assent to the Marriage (Same Sex Couples) Act 2013, which legalised same-sex marriage in England and Wales. Sections of the act permitting same-sex marriages to be solemnised went into effect on 13 March 2014, with the first same-sex marriage ceremonies in England occurring on 29 March 2014. The law does not apply to the British Indian Ocean Territory. On 28 April 2014, the Privy Council of the United Kingdom enacted the Overseas Marriage (Armed Forces) Order 2014, which took effect on 3 June 2014. The order permits same-sex marriages to be conducted at all British Army bases, including the base in Diego Garcia. The intending spouses must provide an advance notice of marriage to their commanding officer, who will then issue a certificate permitting the marriage to be solemnised if the parties meet all the requirements to marry. One of the parties must be a member of the British Armed Forces, or be a person who performs "administrative, executive, judicial, clerical, typing, duplicating, machine operating, paper keeping, managerial, professional, scientific, experimental, technical, industrial or labouring functions" for the Armed Forces. In February 2020, MP Christopher Pincher, answering as Parliamentary Private Secretary for the Foreign Secretary, confirmed that the "laws in the uninhabited territories of the British Indian Ocean Territory, [...] allow for same-sex marriage."

== Religious performance ==
The marriage of a same-sex couple may also be solemnised according to the rites of a religious denomination, with the exception of the Church of England and the Church in Wales. Both churches allow their clergy to bless—but not perform—same-sex marriages.

== See also ==
- Same-sex marriage in the United Kingdom
- Recognition of same-sex unions in the British Overseas Territories
- Recognition of same-sex unions in Asia
