= Same-sex marriage in Akrotiri and Dhekelia =

Same-sex marriage has been legal in Akrotiri and Dhekelia since 3 June 2014. An Order in Council to legalise same-sex marriages was approved by the Privy Council of the United Kingdom on 28 April 2014 and came into effect on 3 June. However, this only applies if one of the parties to the marriage is a member of the British Armed Forces. The order does not apply to the local civil population residing in Akrotiri and Dhekelia. Military personnel have also been able to enter into civil partnerships since 2005.

== Background ==
The British Overseas Territory of Akrotiri and Dhekelia was established in 1960 by the London and Zürich Agreements when British Cyprus was granted independence from the British Empire. The United Kingdom sought to retain sovereignty over the areas of Akrotiri and Dhekelia as this guaranteed the use of UK military bases on the island of Cyprus. The bases are at a strategic location, being at the eastern edge of the Mediterranean Sea and close to the Middle East and the Suez Canal.

When the Republic of Cyprus became independent in 1960, the United Kingdom declared that the laws applicable to the Cypriot population of the Akrotiri and Dhekelia would be as far as possible the same as the laws of Cyprus. Some laws of the Republic, primarily those relating to agriculture and taxes, are adopted as made by the Republic. Adopted laws form part of the law of the territory without the need for new legislation to be made when the law of Cyprus changes. Some laws of the United Kingdom are also directly applicable to Akrotiri and Dhekelia or have been extended by an Order in Council. These laws mainly concern external relations. The Administrator of Akrotiri and Dhekelia has also the power, by reason of the Sovereign Base Areas of Akrotiri and Dhekelia Order in Council, 1960, to make laws for the territory; primary legislation known as "ordinances" and secondary legislation known as "public instruments".

== Same-sex marriage law ==
Laws regarding same-sex partnerships in Europe¹ Marriage Civil union Limited domestic recognition (cohabitation) Limited foreign recognition (residency rights) Unrecognized Constitution limits marriage to opposite-sex couples ¹ May include recent laws or court decisions that have not yet entered into effect.

On 17 July 2013, Queen Elizabeth II granted royal assent to the Marriage (Same Sex Couples) Act 2013, which legalised same-sex marriage in England and Wales. Sections of the act permitting same-sex marriages to be solemnised went into effect on 13 March 2014, with the first same-sex marriage ceremonies in England occurring on 29 March 2014. The law does not apply to Akrotiri and Dhekelia. On 28 April 2014, the Privy Council of the United Kingdom enacted the Overseas Marriage (Armed Forces) Order 2014, (Note: Greek: Διάταγμα Υπερπόντιου Γάμου (Ένοπλες Δυνάμεις) του 2014, Diátagma Yperpóntiou Gámou (Énoples Dynámeis) tou 2014; Turkish: Yurtdışında Evlilik (Silahlı Kuvvetler) Kararnamesi 2014) which took effect on 3 June 2014. The order permits same-sex marriages to be conducted at all British Army bases, including the bases in Akrotiri and Dhekelia. The intending spouses must provide an advance notice of marriage to their commanding officer, who will then issue a certificate permitting the marriage to be solemnised if the parties meet all the requirements to marry. One of the parties must be a member of the British Armed Forces, or be a person who performs "administrative, executive, judicial, clerical, typing, duplicating, machine operating, paper keeping, managerial, professional, scientific, experimental, technical, industrial or labouring functions" for the Armed Forces. The first same-sex couple to marry in the territory were Sergeant Alastair Smith, a member of the 2nd Battalion of the Princess of Wales's Royal Regiment, and Aaron Weston who married in Dhekelia on 10 September 2016. The marriage ceremony was conducted by Air Vice-Marshal Michael Wigston.

Same-sex couples may also enter into civil partnerships under the Civil Partnership (Armed Forces) Order 2005, which came into effect on 7 December 2005. Similarly to marriage, the intending civil partners must provide a notice of proposed civil partnership to a registering officer, and one of the partners must be a member of the Armed Forces or subject to service discipline serving in the territory. However, both orders do not apply to the local civil population residing in the territory. Cyprus does not recognise same-sex marriage but has offered same-sex couples several of the rights and benefits of marriage in the form of civil cohabitations since December 2015.

== Religious performance ==
The marriage of a same-sex couple may also be solemnised according to the rites of a religious denomination, with the exception of the Church of England and the Church in Wales. The United Reformed Church has allowed its congregations to perform same-sex marriages since 2016, and has a reverend stationed in Dhekelia. The Church of England and the Church in Wales allow their clergy to bless—but not perform—same-sex marriages.

== See also ==
- LGBTQ rights in Akrotiri and Dhekelia
- Same-sex marriage in the United Kingdom
- Recognition of same-sex unions in the British Overseas Territories
- Recognition of same-sex unions in Cyprus
