= Next Gibraltar general election =

- TBA 2027

All 17 seats in the Gibraltar Parliament 9 seats needed for a majority

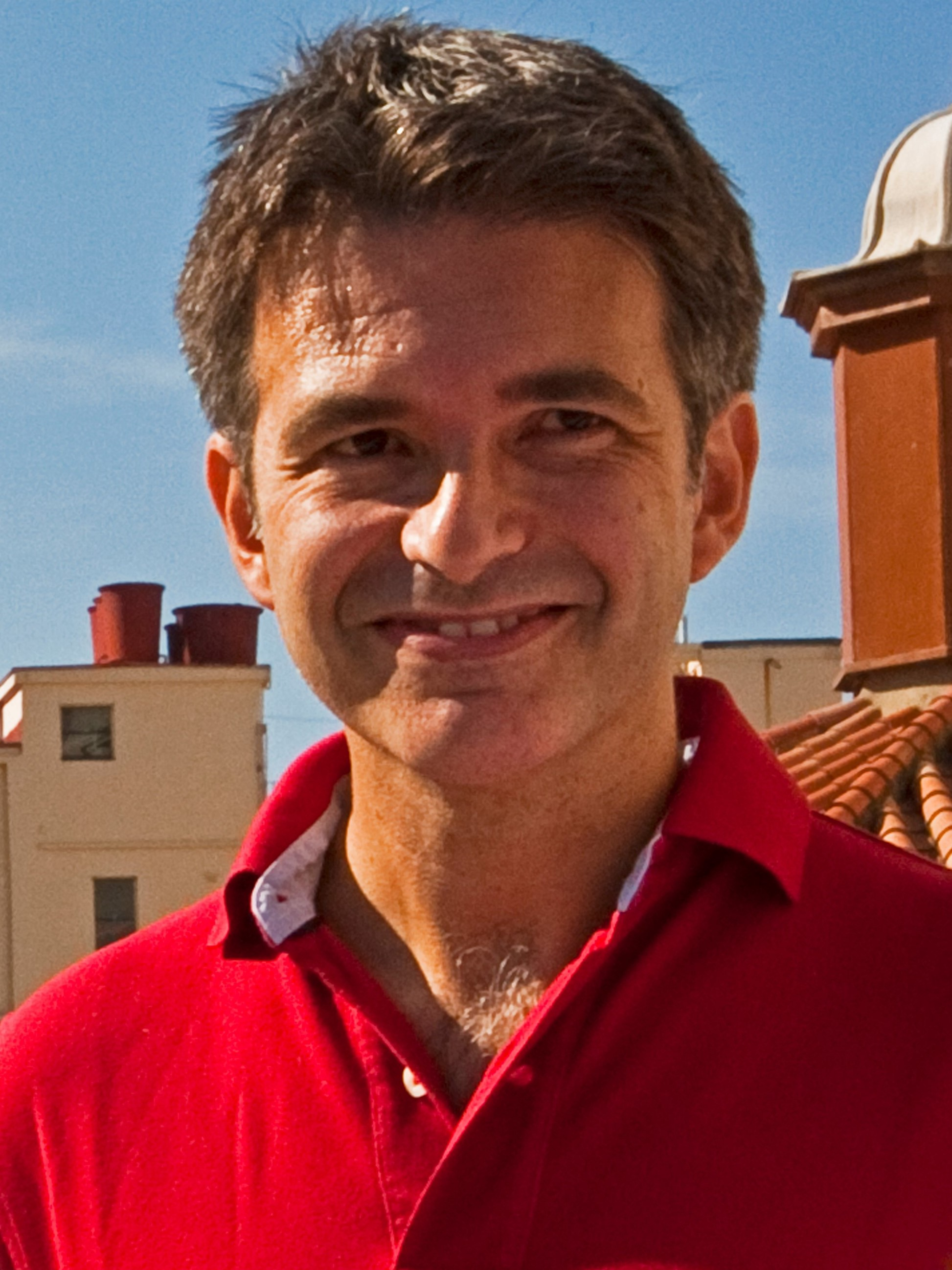

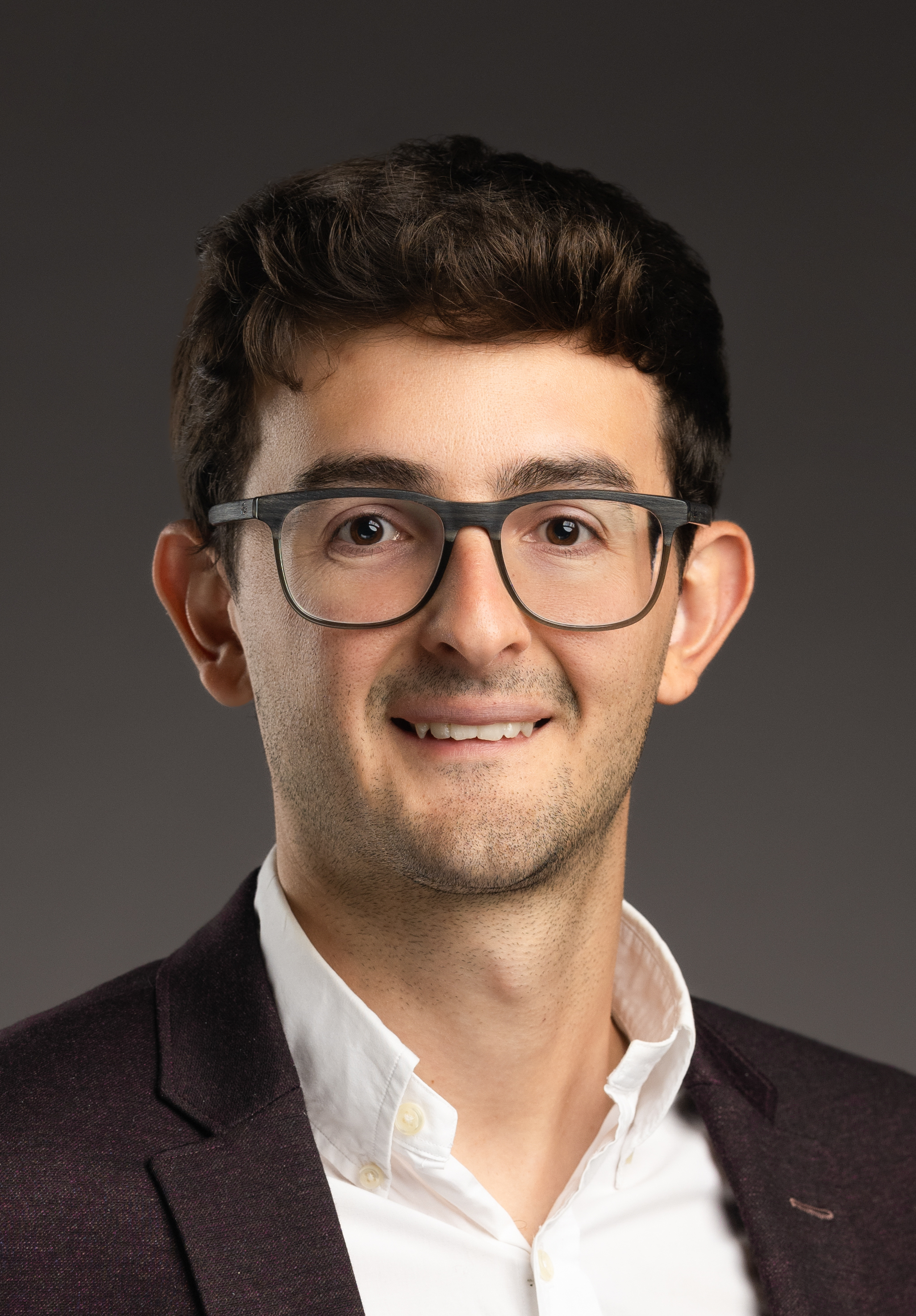
Leader	TBD	Keith Azopardi	Nicky Calamaro
Party	Socialist Labour	Social Democrats	Together Gibraltar
Alliance	GSLP-Liberal Alliance
Last election	50.04%, 9 seats	48.15%, 8 seats	Did not contest
Seats needed	Steady	▲1	▲9
Incumbent Chief Minister
Fabian Picardo
Socialist Labour

General elections will be held in Gibraltar by 8 March 2028 to elect all 17 members to the sixth Gibraltar Parliament.

== Background ==
Before the 2023 elections, Chief Minister Fabian Picardo announced that if elected, his fourth term as Chief Minister would be his last, and suggested Gemma Arias-Vasquez (the new Minister for Health, Care and Business) to be his successor as leader of the Gibraltar Socialist Labour Party, if elected by the party, thus would become Gibraltar's first female Chief Minister. Nigel Feetham, the new Minister for Justice, Trade & Industry, has also expressed interest in succeeding Picardo as party leader on social media.

On 5 November 2024, Picardo rescinded his retirement plan, announcing on GBC that he would be standing for the next elections as party leader, subject to a vote of confidence by party membership at its AGM. Feetham subsequently rescinded his leadership bid, which resulted in Picardo being re-elected party leader unopposed.

On 20 October 2025, it was announced that the GSLP will hold its next AGM on the 20th of November to elect its five executive members. On the same day, it was announced that Fabian Picardo will not stand for reelection for the leadership elections on that day and had a date set for when he will step down as party leader.

In his New Year Message in 2026, Fabian Picardo announced that the full year would be his last as Chief Minister, ready to step aside by the next general elections in 2027.

On 3rd June 2026, it was announced that Gemma Arias-Vasquez will stand uncontested in the next GSLP leadership election after her nearest contender, Nigel Feetham, decided to step down and support her candidacy.

== Polling ==
=== Midterm Polling ===
On 13 October 2025, GBC released three midterm polls, carried out by independent critical research company, Mediatel Ltd, of who would be elected if an election were held the next day.

The first was which party/candidates the public would vote for, and/or how to vote. The results were as follows:

- GSD - 28.52%
- Don't know - 26.48%
- GSLP/Libs - 20.47%
- Split voting - 14.45%
- Independent candidate(s) - 10.09%

The second was for which one of the current MPs does the public think is suitable to be the Chief Minister:

- Other - 24.39%
- Fabian Picardo (GSLP/Libs) (Chief Minister since 2011) - 15.49%
- Damon Bossino (GSD) - 14.42%
- Gemma Arias-Vasquez (GSLP/Libs) - 11.52%
- Keith Azopardi (GSD) - 11.52%
- Nigel Feetham (GSLP/Libs) - 5.23%
- Joseph Garcia (GSLP/Libs) - 4.84%
- Christian Santos (GSLP/Libs) - 2.42%
- Craig Sacarello (GSD) - 2.13%
- Sir Joe Bossano (GSLP/Libs) - 1.94%
- Giovanni Origo (GSD) - 1.36%
- Roy Clinton (GSD) - 1.06%
- John Cortes (GSLP/Libs) - 0.77%
- Joelle Ladislaus (GSD) - 0.77%
- Leslie Bruzon (GSLP/Libs) - 0.68%
- Patricia Orfila (GSLP/Libs) - 0.48%
- Edwin Reyes (GSD) - 0.48%
- Atrish Sanchez (GSD) - 0.48%

The third poll was to ask the public which of the current MPs they want to vote for to be or remain in Parliament:

- Other - 37.50%
- Damon Bossino (GSD) - 34.98%
- Gemma Arias-Vasquez (GSLP/Libs) - 33.53%
- Craig Sacarello (GSD) - 32.17%
- Keith Azopardi (GSD) - 30.52%
- Joseph Garcia (GSLP/Libs) - 30.04%
- Nigel Feetham (GSLP/Libs) - 29.75%
- Roy Clinton (GSD) - 28.10%
- Christian Santos (GSLP/Libs) - 27.33%
- Fabian Picardo (GSLP/Libs) - 26.07%
- Joelle Ladislaus (GSD) - 24.42%
- Giovanni Origo (GSD) - 22.77%
- Edwin Reyes (GSD) - 18.70%
- John Cortes (GSLP/Libs) - 17.73%
- Atrish Sanchez (GSD) - 17.64%
- Leslie Bruzon (GSLP/Libs) - 14.53%
- Joe Bossano (GSLP/Libs) - 14.44%
- Patricia Orfila (GSLP/Libs) - 12.98%

== Electoral system ==
Under section 38(2) of the Gibraltar Constitution Order 2006, the parliament must be dissolved four years after its first meeting following the last election (unless the Chief Minister advises the Governor of Gibraltar to dissolve parliament sooner). Under section 37 of the Constitution, writs for a general election must be issued within thirty days of the dissolution and the general election must then be held no later than three months after the issuing of a writ.

With the first meeting of the current parliament taking place on 10 November 2023, parliament must be dissolved before midnight on 9 November 2027, writs must be issued by 9 December 2027 and an election must take place before 8 March 2028. However, if recent precedent is followed, the Chief Minister is likely to ask the Governor for an early dissolution and an election to take place sometime in October 2027 (four years after the last election). Following the British tradition, elections conventionally take place on a Thursday.

== Incumbent members (from 2023) ==
Note: Roles in Italics mean unofficial parliamentary roles made from the government by the ruling alliance after 2023. The Opposition announced that they would not create constituent roles.

MP	Party	Parliament role(s)	Seeking re-election?
Joseph Garcia (since 1999) (Note: Elected in 1999 by-election after the death of elected GSLP MP and Shadow Minister & former Mayor of Gibraltar, Robert Mor)	GSLP–Liberal Alliance (LPG)	Deputy Chief Minister (since 2011); Leader of LPG (since 1992); Constituency MP for the Lower Town	
Fabian Picardo (since 2003)	GSLP–Liberal Alliance (GSLP)	Chief Minister (December 2011-2026); Leader of GSLP (April 2011-2026); Constituency MP for Moorish Castle, Calpe and the Upper Town	No
Keith Azopardi (1996–2003; since 2019)	Gibraltar Social Democrats	Leader of Opposition (since 2019); Leader of GSD (since 2017)	
Damon Bossino (2011–2015; since 2019)	Gibraltar Social Democrats	Shadow Minister for Housing, Lands & Heritage	
Nigel Feetham (since 2023)	GSLP–Liberal Alliance (GSLP)	Minister for Justice, Trade & Industry; Constituency MP for Glacis Estate, Laguna Estate, Ocean Village and Bayside	Yes
Gemma Arias-Vasquez (since 2023)	GSLP–Liberal Alliance (GSLP)	Minister for Health, Care & Business; Constituency MP for the Westside Area	Yes
John Cortes (since 2011)	GSLP–Liberal Alliance (GSLP)	Minister for the Environment, Sustainability, Climate Change & Education; Constituency MP for Alameda Estate and the South District	
Roy Clinton (since 2015)	Gibraltar Social Democrats	Shadow Minister for Finance & Value for Money (since 2015); Former Interim Leader of GSD (July-November 2017); Former Interim Leader of Opposition (2017-2019)	
Craig Sacarello (since 2023)	Gibraltar Social Democrats	Shadow Minister for Business, Trade, Industry, Utilities & Community	
Christian Santos (since 2023)	GSLP–Liberal Alliance (GSLP)	Minister for Equality, Employment, Culture & Tourism; Constituency MP for Varyl Begg Estate, Sir William Jackson Grove and Mid Harbours	
Patricia Orfila (since 2023)	GSLP–Liberal Alliance (GSLP)	Minister for Housing; Constituency MP for the area of Bayview, Cumberland, Nelson’s View, The Anchorage, Rosia Plaza, Rosia Dale and Europa Point	
Edwin Reyes (since 2007)	Gibraltar Social Democrats	Shadow Minister for Education, Employment & Culture	
Joelle Ladislaus (since 2023)	Gibraltar Social Democrats	Shadow Minister for Health & Justice	
Leslie Bruzon (since 2023)	GSLP–Liberal Alliance (LPG)	Minister for Industrial Relations, Civil Contingencies & Sport; Constituency MP for the Eastside and Catalan Bay	
Joseph Bossano (since 1972)	GSLP–Liberal Alliance (GSLP) (since 1980)	Minister for Economic Development, Enterprise, Telecommunications & the Gibraltar Savings Bank; Constituency MP with Special Responsibility for Senior Citizens	
Giovanni Origo (since 2023)	Gibraltar Social Democrats	Shadow Minister for Environment, Tourism, Transport & Youth	
Atrish Sanchez (since 2023)	Gibraltar Social Democrats	Shadow Minister for Care & Opportunity	

== Parties and candidates ==
Party or alliance	Ideology	Current Seats	Slogan	Election Logo
GSLP/Libs Alliance	Social Democracy, Social Liberalism	9		
GSD	Liberal Conservatism, British Unionism	8		
