= 2019 Gibraltar general election =

- 17 October 2019

All 17 seats in the Gibraltar Parliament 9 seats needed for a majority
- Turnout: 70.84% (▲0.07pp)
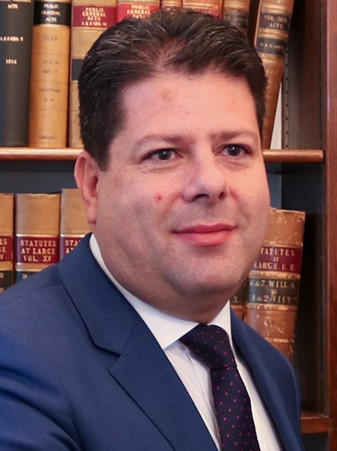

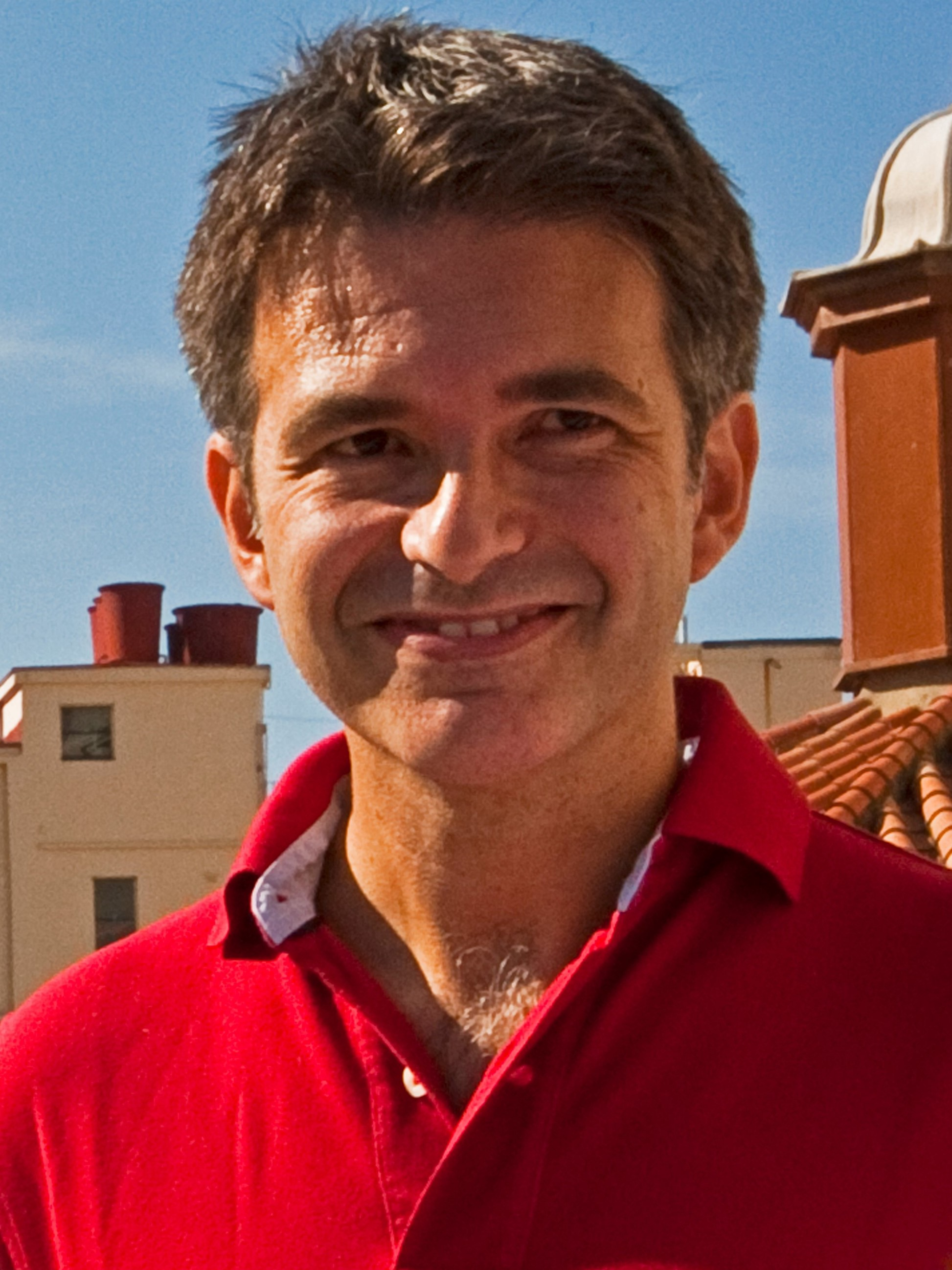

	First party	Second party	Third party
Leader	Fabian Picardo	Keith Azopardi	Marlene Hassan-Nahon
Party	Socialist Labour	Social Democrats	Together Gibraltar
Alliance	GSLP–Liberal
Last election	68.44%, 10 seats	31.56%, 7 seats	–
Seats won	10	6	1
Seat change	Steady	▼1	New
Popular vote	83,122	40,453	32,455
Percentage	52.50%	25.55%	20.50%
Swing	▼15.94pp	▼6.01pp	New
Chief Minister before election
Fabian Picardo
Socialist Labour
Elected Chief Minister
Fabian Picardo
Socialist Labour

General elections were held in Gibraltar on 17 October 2019 to elect all 17 members to the fourth Gibraltar Parliament. Chief Minister Fabian Picardo announced the date of the election on Monday 16 September 2019. In September 2019, it was announced that Libs MP and GSLP/Libs Minister, Neil Costa, would not seek re-election and had his candidacy and seat replaced by Vijay Daryanani of the same party.

The GSLP–Liberal Alliance won their third consecutive election, retaining their majority in the Parliament. Fabian Picardo was returned as Chief Minister of Gibraltar. However both the governing GSLP–Liberal Alliance and the opposition Gibraltar Social Democrats lost votes to new party Together Gibraltar, which won one seat from the GSD.

== Timing and procedure ==
Under section 38(2) of the Gibraltar Constitution Order 2006, the parliament must be dissolved four years after its first meeting following the last election (unless the Chief Minister advises the Governor of Gibraltar to dissolve parliament sooner). Under section 37 of the Constitution, writs for a general election must be issued within thirty days of the dissolution and the general election must then be held no later than three months after the issuing of a writ. In September 2019, Chief Minister Fabian Picardo formally asked Governor Ed Davis to dissolve parliament and call an election for 17 October 2019. Following the British tradition, elections in Gibraltar conventionally take place on a Thursday.

MPs were elected through limited voting.

== Campaign ==
The issue of Brexit (formerly due to take place exactly two weeks after election day) was a major theme in the election campaign, with incumbent Chief Minister Fabian Picardo stating that the territory is ready for a 'no deal' Brexit.

=== Party slogans ===
Party or alliance	Slogan
GSLP/Libs Alliance	"All Our Generations in Our Hearts"
GSD	"The Gibraltar You Deserve"
Together Gibraltar	"Believe in a better way"
Robert Vasquez	"Your Fearless and Independent Voice"
John Charles Pons	"Vote for: The Planet, Humanity, Youths' Future, Greta Thunberg"

=== Incumbent MPs (from 2015) ===
Candidate	Party	Seeking re-election?	Parliamentary role(s)	Notes
Fabian Picardo (since 2003)	GSLP–Liberal Alliance (GSLP)	Yes	Chief Minister (since 2011)	Due to the aftermath of the Brexit referendum, in the reshuffle he relinquished his responsibilities of the media to Steven Linares
Joseph Garcia (since 1999) (Note: Elected in 1999 by-election after the death of elected GSLP MP and Shadow Minister & former Mayor of Gibraltar, Robert Mor)	GSLP–Liberal Alliance (LPG)	Yes	Deputy Chief Minister (since 2011)	At the reshuffle, he inherited responsibilities of Exiting the EU.
John Cortes (since 2011)	GSLP–Liberal Alliance (GSLP)	Yes	Minister for Health, the Environment, Energy and Climate Change (2015–2016); Minister for the Environment, Energy, Climate Change and Climate Education (2016–2019)	Ministries reshuffled as a result of the aftermath of the Brexit referendum
Gilbert Licudi (since 2011)	GSLP–Liberal Alliance (GSLP)	Yes	Minister for Education, and Justice & International Exchange of Information (2015–2016); Minister for Tourism, Employment, Commercial Aviation and the Port (2016–2019)	Ministries reshuffled as a result of the aftermath of the Brexit referendum
Albert Isola (since 2013) (Note: Elected in 2013 by-election after the death of elected MP and Minister for Housing and the Elderly, Charles Bruzon.)	GSLP–Liberal Alliance (GSLP)	Yes	Minister for Financial Services and Gaming (2015–2016); Minister for Commerce (2016–2019)	Ministries reshuffled as a result of the aftermath of the Brexit referendum
Neil Costa (since 2011)	GSLP–Liberal Alliance (LPG)	No	Minister for Business & Employment (2015–2016); Minister for Health, Care and Justice (2016–2019)	Ministries reshuffled as a result of the aftermath of the Brexit referendum
Samantha Sacramento (since 2011)	GSLP–Liberal Alliance (GSLP)	Yes	Minister for Tourism, Housing, Equality and Social Services (2015–2016); Minister for Housing and Equality (2016–2019)	Ministries reshuffled as a result of the aftermath of the Brexit referendum
Steven Linares (since 2000)	GSLP–Liberal Alliance (LPG)	Yes	Minister for Sports, Culture, Heritage and Youth (2015–2016); Minister for Culture, the Media, Youth and Sport (2016–2019)	Inherited responsibilities of the media away from the Chief Minister himself by him. Reshuffled due to aftermath of Brexit referendum.
Paul Balban (since 2011)	GSLP–Liberal Alliance (GSLP)	Yes	Minister for Transport, Traffic and Technical Services (2015–2016); Minister for Infrastructure and Planning (2016–2019)	Ministries reshuffled as a result of the aftermath of the Brexit referendum
Daniel Feetham (since 2007)	GSD	Yes	Leader of the Opposition (2013–2017)	He was voted by the GSD's membership against his colleague, Damon Bossino, to be party leader since 2013 (thus making him Leader of the Opposition). He resigned his post in 2017 after whip resignations from Marlene Hassan-Nahon and Lawrence Llamas respectively.
Marlene Hassan-Nahon	GSD	Yes	Shadow Minister for Health, Education & Broadcasting and Media (2015–2016); Independent Opposition MP (2016–2018); Together Gibraltar MP (2018–2019)	Elected as GSD Opposition Whip. Later, in 2016, she left the party due to alleged "toxic" ideology under Daniel Feetham's leadership. Afterward, she became an independent until 2018, when she founded her political movement, Together Gibraltar (later evolved to a political party after membership votes in 2019).
Elliot Phillips	GSD	Yes	Shadow Minister for Justice, Employment and Training, Youth, Equality, Civil Rights, Exchange of Information & Drugs and Rehabilitation	
Edwin Reyes (since 2007)	GSD	Yes	Shadow Minister for Housing, Sports and Leisure, Culture & Civil Contingencies	
Roy Clinton	GSD	Yes	Shadow Minister for Public Finance, GSB, Inward Investment, Small Business and Heritage (since 2015); Interim Leader of the Opposition (2017); Opposition Parliamentary Leader (2017–2019)	Inherited Interim Leader of the Opposition after Daniel Feetham's resignation. He was a candidate for the permanent role against re-joined former MP, Minister and DCM, Keith Azopardi. He was unsuccessful for the role after a leadership election from his party's membership. He became the GSD's Parliament Leader due to new LoO, Keith Azopardi, originally haven't been a candidate from the last election.
Trevor Hammond	GSD	Yes	Shadow Minister for Environment, Transport and Traffic, Technical Services, Utilities, Planning, Health and Safety & European Affairs	
Lawrence Llamas	GSD	No	Shadow Minister for Social Services, Families and Children, Tourism, The Port & Animal Abuse and Welfare (2015–2017 & 2018–2019); Independent MP (2017–2018)	Resigned his whip in 2017 due to ideological disagreements with Daniel Feetham. He later rejoined after Keith Azopardi became the new Leader of the Opposition

== Results ==
Party or alliance		Votes	%	Seats	+/–
Alliance	Gibraltar Socialist Labour Party	58,576	37.00	7	0
Alliance	Liberal Party of Gibraltar	24,546	15.50	3	0
Alliance	Total	83,122	52.50	10	0
Gibraltar Social Democrats		40,453	25.55	6	–1
Together Gibraltar		32,455	20.50	1	+1
Independents		2,298	1.45	0	0
Total		158,328	100.00	17	0
Valid votes		16,767	97.85		
Invalid/blank votes		368	2.15		
Total votes		17,135	100.00		
Registered voters/turnout		24,189	70.84		
Source: Parliament, Parliament

=== By candidate ===
Candidate	Party	Alliance	Votes	Notes
Fabian Picardo	GSLP	GSLP–Liberal Alliance	9,961	Elected
Joseph Garcia	LPG	GSLP–Liberal Alliance	9,672	Elected
John Cortes	GSLP	GSLP–Liberal Alliance	9,003	Elected
Albert Isola	GSLP	GSLP–Liberal Alliance	8,502	Elected
Joseph Bossano	GSLP	GSLP–Liberal Alliance	8,374	Elected
Gilbert Licudi	GSLP	GSLP–Liberal Alliance	8,293	Elected
Steven Linares	LPG	GSLP–Liberal Alliance	7,718	Elected
Paul Balban	GSLP	GSLP–Liberal Alliance	7,251	Elected
Samantha Sacramento	GSLP	GSLP–Liberal Alliance	7,192	Elected
Vijay Daryanani	LPG	GSLP–Liberal Alliance	7,156	Elected
Marlene Hassan-Nahon	TG	None	5,639	Elected
Damon Bossino	GSD	None	4,868	Elected
Daniel Feetham	GSD	None	4,842	Elected
Keith Azopardi	GSD	None	4,711	Elected
Roy Clinton	GSD	None	4,342	Elected
Elliott Phillips	GSD	None	4,165	Elected
Edwin Reyes	GSD	None	3,840	Elected
Craig Sacarello	TG	None	3,805	
Alfred Ballester	GSD	None	3,681	
Joelle Ladislaus	GSD	None	3,484	
Trevor Hammond	GSD	None	3,451	Unseated
Siân Jones	TG	None	3,345	
John Montegriffo	TG	None	3,158	
Orlando Yeats	GSD	None	3,069	
Kamlesh Khubchand Daswani	TG	None	3,035	
Neil Samtani	TG	None	2,889	
Daniel Ghio	TG	None	2,780	
Erika Pozo	TG	None	2,640	
Jackie Anderson	TG	None	2,619	
Tamsin Suarez	TG	None	2,545	
Robert Vasquez	Independent	None	1,460	
John Charles Pons	Independent	None	838	
Source: Parliament of Gibraltar, Together Gibraltar Candidates
