= 2017 Gibraltar Social Democrats leadership election =

Gibraltar Social Democrats leadership election
← 2013	November 30, 2017	2023 →
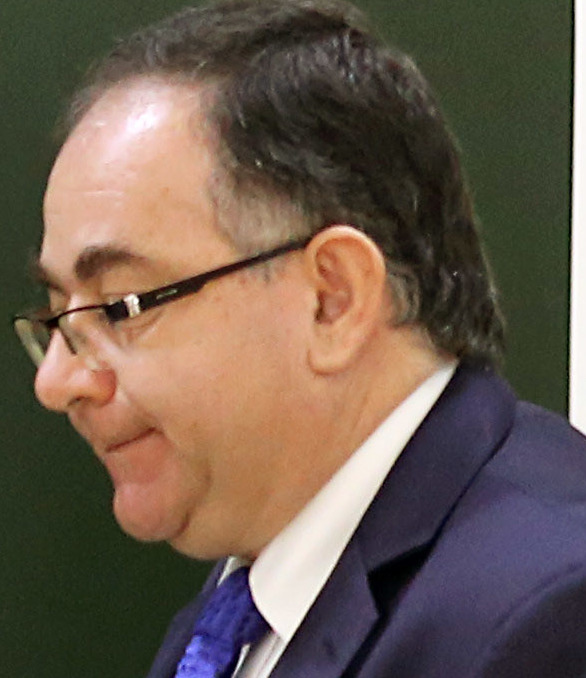

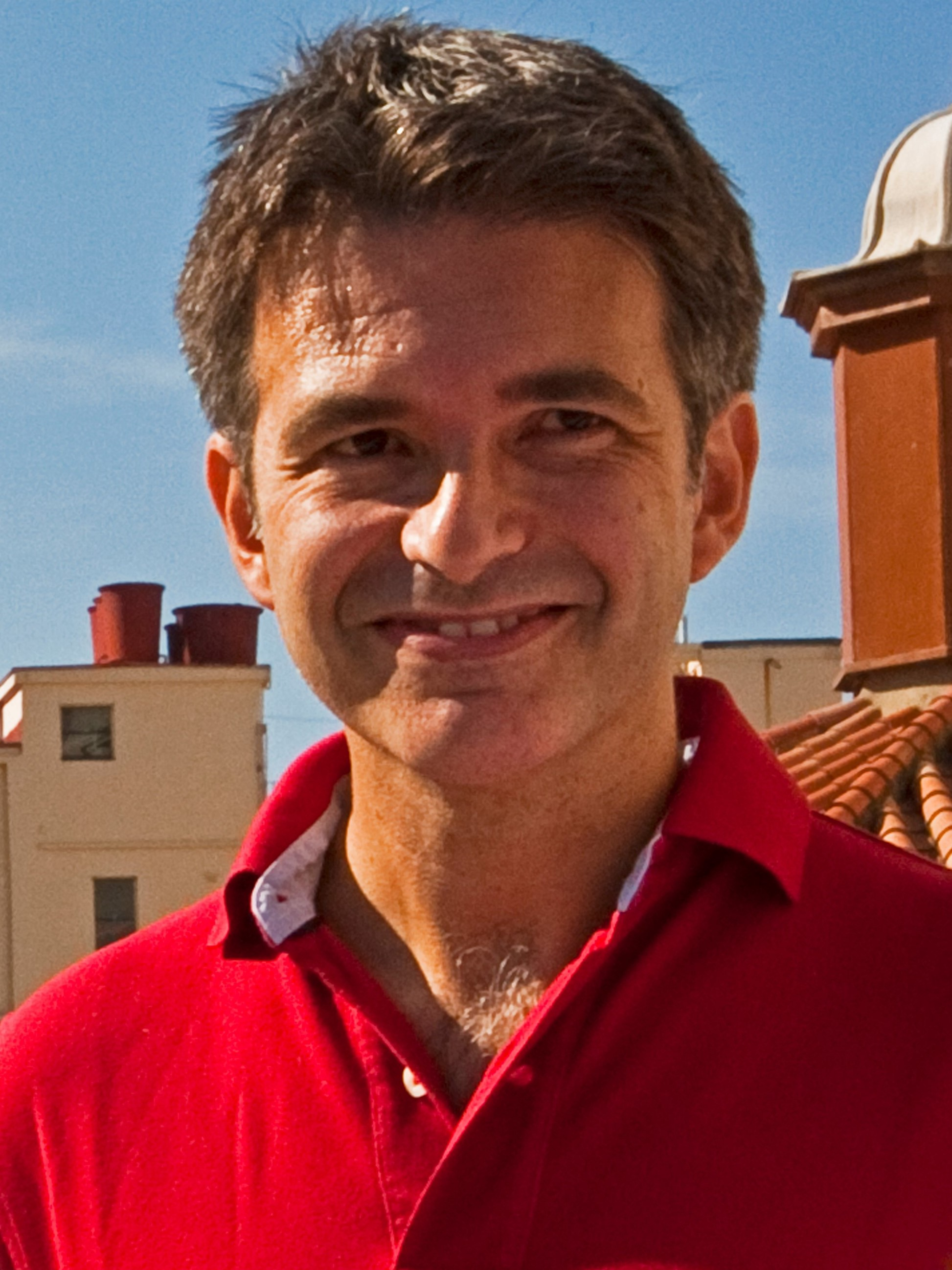
Candidate	Roy Clinton	Keith Azopardi
Party	Social Democrats	Social Democrats
Percentage	-40%	+60%
Leader before election
Roy Clinton (interim) Daniel Feetham (Full Leader, resigned)
Elected Leader
Keith Azopardi

An election for the leadership of the Gibraltar Social Democrats was held after the previous leader, Daniel Feetham, resigned.

== Potential candidates ==
=== Members of Parliament ===
After two MPs (Lawrence Llamas and Marlene Hassan-Nahon) resigned the party whip to become independents, the party has five members of parliament. Excluding Daniel Feetham, they are as follows:

- Elliott Phillips
- Edwin Reyes
- Roy Clinton - interim leader
- Trevor Hammond

=== The Candidates ===
The candidates who decided to contest were the party's interim leader, Roy Clinton and Keith Azopardi, former minister and Deputy Chief Minister of Gibraltar, who had rejoined the party in 2017 after leaving them in 2003 and politics completely since 2012

=== Non MPs ===
Two former ministers, Keith Azopardi and Damon Bossino, are said to be considering applying for the post. A third, Peter Montegriffo, has declined to stand. Damon Bossino also announced to decline to take stand later on. Keith Azzopardi announced to stand for leadership and had challenged Interim leader, MP and candidate, Roy Clinton.
