= Julio Mangada =

Spanish Republican Army officer (1877–1946)

Colonel Julio Mangada
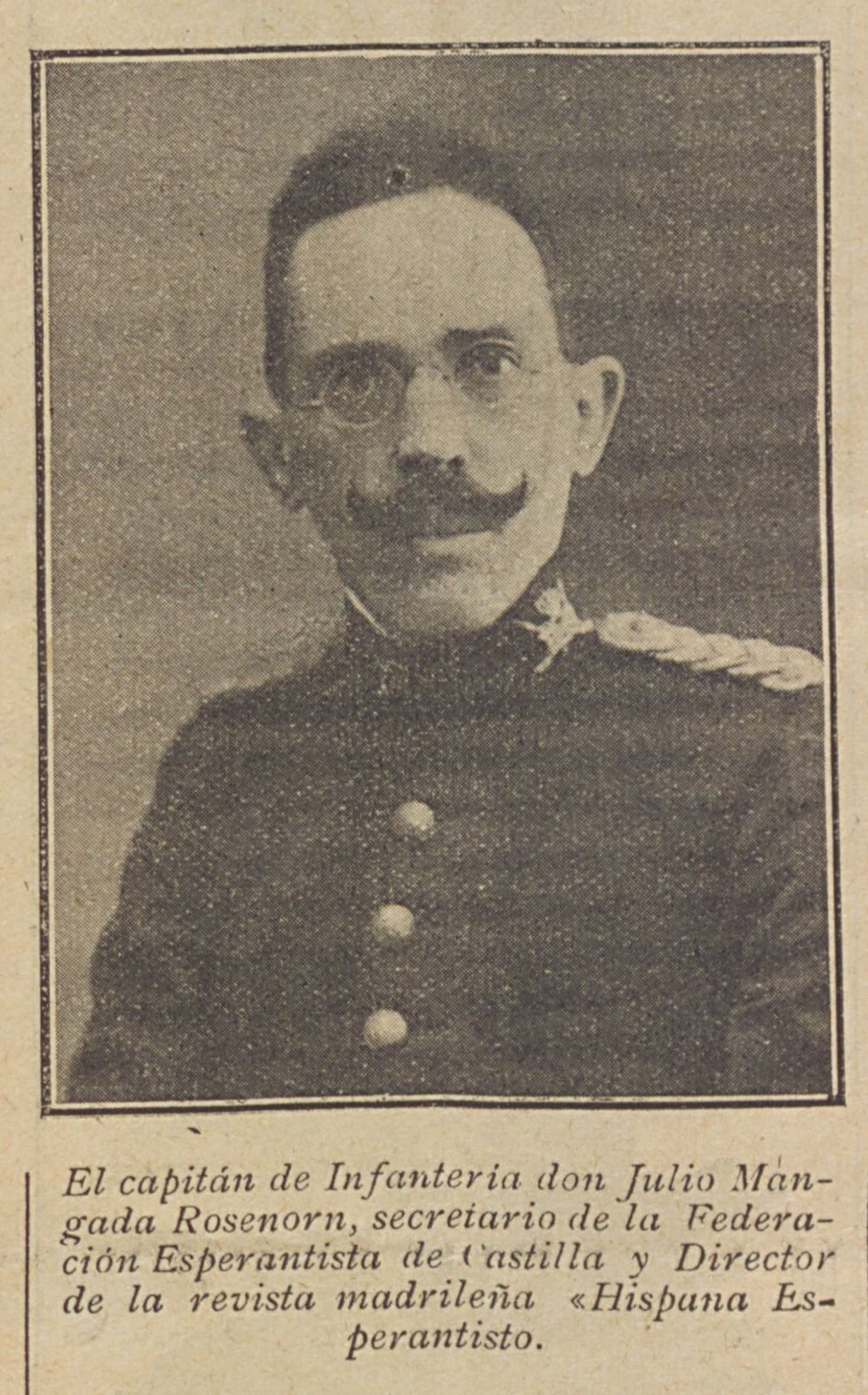
- Born: Julio Mangada Rosenörn; 30 June 1877; Sancti Spíritus, Captaincy General of Cuba
- Died: 14 April 1946 (aged 68) Mexico City, Mexico
- Allegiance: Kingdom of Spain; Spanish Republic
- Branch: Spanish Army; Spanish Republican Army
- Service years: 1896–1939
- Rank: Colonel
- Conflicts: Spanish Civil War

Julio Mangada Rosenörn (30 June 1877 Sancti Spíritus, Cuba – 14 April 1946, Mexico City) was a prominent Spanish Republican Army officer during the Second Spanish Republic and the Spanish Civil War.

== Early years ==
His father had also been a garrison commander stationed in Cuba; his grandfather had been head of a college for young men, while his grandmother headed a girls' and young women's school. One day, he wrote in his autobiography, some of his grandfather's students left college to form a guerrilla detachment dedicated to the independence of Cuba. Home life for him was such that as a four-year-old amongst the soldiers of the garrison his father commanded as infantry captain he would hear the cry "Viva Cuba libre!" and did not think it strange. In Spain, at the age of eight, on the occasion of the republican rebellion of General Villacampo, he ran to the Guadalajara railway station to hear rebels joining with children in cries of "Viva la República!"

As a little boy, he writes, he often heard about Volapük, an earlier constructed language to which his father was somewhat sympathetic. His friend, some teachers at high school and normal school, as well as teachers at the military engineering academy, belonged to a Volapük club, and he sometimes heard them speaking about the need and utility for an auxiliary international language. In his infancy and boyhood, he writes, he experienced "many of the evils of clericalism," when after having lost his mother his father remarried, and his stepmother was "terribly bigoted."

== Military career ==
A professional soldier, well known for his progressive and often radical ideas, Mangada began his military career in 1896 by joining the Infantry Academy, where he was commissioned as a lieutenant. On May 1, 1900, as a young infantry lieutenant of the Sicilian 7th Regiment stationed in San Sebastián de los Reyes, a soldier who had heard him express some private views in sympathy to the proletarian celebration of May Day, denounced him to his colonel, and he was arrested. In 1904 he began a close friendship with journalist and writer José Nakens, who constantly battled reactionaries and struggled tirelessly to achieve a Spanish republic. In 1906, he writes, he had been promoted to captain, but to his great chagrin had to visit his new friend in a cell where Nakens had been imprisoned after having been suspected of agitation in favour of the murder of King Alfonso XIII. Other republicans visiting him in prison invited Mangada to join the Masons, which he did. About the same time he met then-Captain (later General) José Perogordo, who taught him the Esperanto language.

He was subsequently promoted to commander (1918) and to lieutenant colonel (1929).

Colonel Mangada played a major military and political role as a military officer in the Second Spanish Republic, where in 1932 he was the protagonist of the "incident of Carabanchel", in which, after the defeat of dictator Miguel Primo de Rivera (1870–1930) and the exile of the unpopular King Alfonso XIII, Mangada gained huge popular support by defending the democratically elected Spanish government against right-wing officers who supported the rebellious monarchist forces that were eventually to coalesce under Francisco Franco. After Justice Minister Alvaro de Albornoz spoke in Avila defending the arrests of rebel army officers, disgraced Generals Milans del Bosch and José Cavalcanti (1871–1936) proclaimed their outrage and were themselves arrested. On June 27, with the full support of War Minister Manuel Azaña, Colonel Mangada confronted, arrested and imprisoned the rebellious Caballero (1869–1946), Major General Goded (1882–1936) and General Villegas at the Carabanchel parade ground.

In 1936, at the beginning of the Civil War, he commanded a military group known as "Column Mangada", which won several important battles near Madrid. His troops defeated columns from the fascist commander Lisardo Doval, and killed the co-founder of Falange Española, Onésimo Redondo. For this he was promoted to Colonel, but was widely known informally as the People's General.

After some defeats, he was given other responsibilities. At the end of the war he fled Spain aboard the ship Stanbrook to Algiers, and after some months to Mexico, where he died.

== Esperanto activities ==
In his late twenties he became an Esperantist (1906) — joining the Hispana Societo por Propagando de Esperanto, which had been founded in 1903 — and immediately began to promote the Esperanto language by means of a magazine published in Madrid called Hispana esperantisto. From 1912 Mangada led several courses at the Ateneo de Madrid teaching the international language. In 1911 he was co-founder of the magazine Homaro ("Humanity"), which published in 1913 L. L. Zamenhof's political-religious manifesto Homaranismo, a doctrine Mangado strongly supported. He also began writing articles in Esperanto and translated works from Spanish literature.

In 1916 he founded a Spanish group called Federación Zamenhof, editing and publishing its journal Hispana Esperantisto until 1923. The Hispana Societo por Propagando de Esperanto had dissolved after the end of World War I], so in 1925 Mangada co-founded a successor organization, the Hispana Esperanto-Asocio, serving as the group's president for several years. From 1928 until 1930 he was publisher of the Hispana Esperanto-Gazeto. Mangada represented the Spanish government at five World Congresses of Esperanto. His Esperantist activities did not end with his eventual departure from Spain, as he continued writing in Esperanto whilst in exile in Algeria and Mexico. Esperantist historians like Yukio Hirai, Ulrich Lins and Marco Antonio Botella has studied his career and compiled brief biographies.

== Works ==
=== In Esperanto ===
- Ferdinando VIa kaj Farinelli (historical novel, 1920)
- Helpanta temaro por ĉiuj landoj (course on esperanto, 1925)
- Avila (1925)
- Pri Hispanujo kaj ĝiaj popolkantoj
- Versaĵaro (verses, 1922)
- El moderna hispana Parnaso (anthology of poems, 1927)
- Cervantes: Du junaj fraŭlinoj kaj Korneliino (translation of two of Miguel de Cervantes' Novelas ejemplares, 1927)
- Amelia kaj Marina (poems, 1934)

=== In Spanish ===
- ¿Con quién?, historical portraits.
- El fascio en el ejército (1934), a denunciation of fascist conspiracies in the Republican army.
