= Marlene Hassan-Nahon =

Gibraltarian journalist, historian, former politician

The Honorable Marlene Hassan-Nahon MP

Member of the Parliament of Gibraltar
- In office 9 December 2015 – 12 October 2023

Personal details
- Born: Marlene Dinah Esther Hassan-Nahon Gibraltar
- Party: Together Gibraltar (October 2018-present)
- Other political affiliations: Gibraltar Social Democrats (until May 2016); Independent (May 2016 – October 2018)
- Spouse: Michael Nahon (divorced)
- Children: 4
- Education: University of Manchester
- Website: marlenehassan.wordpress.com

Marlene Dinah Esther Hassan-Nahon (born 1976) is a Gibraltarian historian, journalist and former politician, who served as a member of the Gibraltar Parliament from 2015 until 2023.

== Biography ==
Hassan-Nahon is daughter of the late Chief Minister Sir Joshua Abraham Hassan and his second wife, Marcelle Bensimon, both Jews of Moroccan and Portuguese origin. Her sister, Fleur Hassan-Nahoum, is a barrister and was Deputy Mayor of Jerusalem from 2018 to 2023. She has a BA in History of Art and Architecture from the University of Manchester. She also holds a postgraduate diploma in journalism from the London School of Journalism.

== Political career ==
After the death of minister Charles Bruzon, Hassan Nahon announced her candidacy for the Gibraltar Social Democrats (GSD) in the by-election of 4 July 2013. In a press conference, she stated that she didn't have an agenda (besides the desire to contribute positively to Gibraltar), and said that she was "disappointed" with the policies of the ruling party (the GSLP) and willing to change the composition of Parliament, where there is an "overwhelming number of lawyers" representing both groups of parties. Hassan Nahon received 39.95% of the total votes cast, but was not elected.

=== Member of the Parliament of Gibraltar ===
For the thirteenth election of the Parliament of Gibraltar, Hassan Nahon ran for a seat, resulting in her being elected on 26 November 2015 for the period starting on 9 December 2015 and ending in 2019. On 19 May 2016, she resigned from the Gibraltar Social Democrats, alluding to "toxic" tensions within the party; she decided to continue as a member of the parliament, albeit as an independent.

On 15 September 2016, during a heated exchange of words in Parliament, the Minister of Justice, Gilbert Licudi, swore at Hassan Nahon repeatedly while the microphone was off, but still clearly audible. The Gibraltar Women's Association, represented by the committee member Zohra El Gharbaoui, questioned the lack of attention to this matter by the Gibraltarian government, adding that this was beyond a gender issue, a "complete lack of respect for a fellow MP". On 23 September Licudi issued a public apology to MP Hassan-Nahon.

In 2017 Hassan Nahon launched her movement, Together Gibraltar, a grassroots civil society platform. In November 2018, the movement democratically voted to transition into a political party.

On 24 September 2019, the party entered the Gibraltar General Elections. With TG, Marlene comprised her party to become Gibraltar's 1st and only gender-balanced party candidates in any election (all are party executives). Her colleagues consist of 5 men (Data centre engineer and part-time local rockstar, Daniel Ghio; Electric retail shop [Khubchands] CEO, Kamlesh Khubchand; Social worker, John Montegriffo; Local interior design studio [L. Sacarello] businessman, Craig Sacarello & Banker, Neil Samtani) and 4 other women (Local writer, Jackie Anderson; Regulatory Consultant, Siân Jones [Gibraltar's first transgender candidate]; Financial Manager, Erika Pozo & Former Administrative Executive, Tamsin Suarez. On election day, Marlene won the only seat for TG, unseating GSD's MP and Shadow Minister, Trevor Hammond, after serving only one term. She also was the most voted Opposition Party leader in the elections, overtaking both former & the new and rejoined GSD leaders, Daniel Feetham & Keith Azopardi, respectively.

On 14 June 2023, she announced that she will not stand for the General Elections 2023 and that she will leave politics after such time comes.

Together Gibraltar finished with an unprecedented result at the General Elections, with party leader Hassan Nahon achieving the most votes in the Opposition Benches. Together Gibraltar received 21% of the overall votes, coming only 3% behind the current official Opposition. During her time as an MP, Hassan Nahon was subject of attacks, many anti-Semitic in nature, for being vocal on issues of importance.
