= Gibraltar referendum =

There have been five referendums held in the territory of Gibraltar

- 1967 Gibraltar sovereignty referendum
- 2002 Gibraltar sovereignty referendum
- 2006 Gibraltar constitutional referendum
- 2016 United Kingdom European Union membership referendum
- 2021 Gibraltar abortion referendum
