= Samantha Sacramento =

Gibraltarian barrister & former politician

The Hon. Samantha Sacramento MP
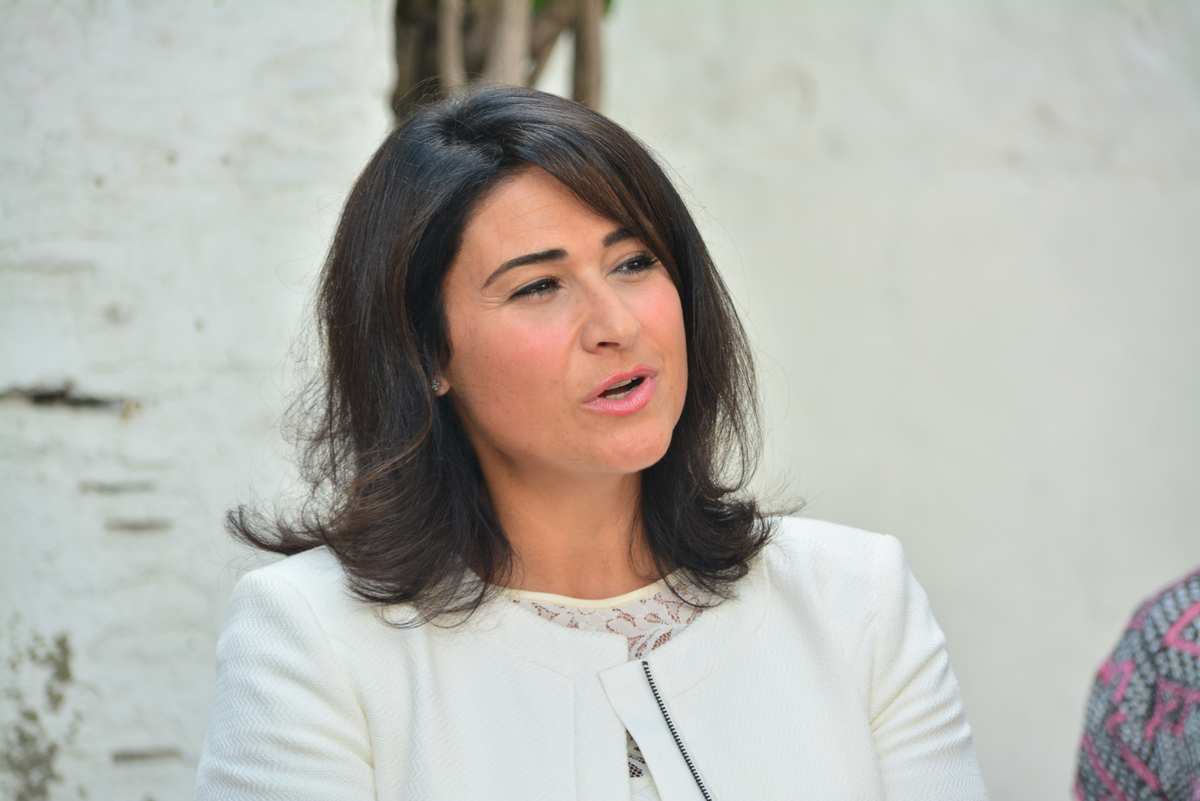

Government Minister
- In office 2011–2023

Personal details
- Born: Gibraltar
- Party: Gibraltar Socialist Labour Party (GSLP)
- Occupation: Lawyer; Politician
- Portfolio: Housing and Equality

Samantha Jane Sacramento is a Gibraltar barrister and former politician. She was the Minister for the Health Authority, Justice, Multiculturalism, Equality and Community Affairs in the Government of Gibraltar.

Sacramento was born in Gibraltar. She attended school in Gibraltar before studying law at the University of Wales in Cardiff, where she obtained LLB and LLM degrees. She qualified as a barrister and joined the Middle Temple.

Between 2001 and 2003, Sacramento worked in the legal team of the Commission for Racial Equality in Cardiff. In 2004, she returned to Gibraltar where she practised as a barrister at Attias & Levy, specialising in commercial and civil litigation.

Sacramento was elected as a member of the Gibraltar Parliament for the Gibraltar Socialist Labour Party in the December 2011 general election. Following the election she was appointed Minister for Social Services and Equality in the government of Fabian Picardo, becoming Gibraltar's first minister for equality. In June 2013, Sacramento deputised for the Chief Minister of Gibraltar during his absence from Gibraltar, becoming the first woman to do so.

In a ministerial reshuffle in 2014, Sacramento was also appointed as Minister for Tourism and Housing.

In the 2016 ministerial reshuffle, Sacramento became Minister for Housing and Equality, which included responsibility for civic rights, citizen's advice, the ombudsman service, consumer affairs, data protection and health and safety. On 15 September 2023, it was announced that she and two other Government MPs and Ministers, Paul Balban and Albert Isola, would not stand for re-election.
