= His Majesty's Most Loyal Opposition (Gibraltar) =

Party with the second most seats in the Gibraltar Parliament

His Majesty's Loyal Opposition, or the Official Opposition in Gibraltar, is led by the Leader of the Opposition. This is usually the political party with the second largest number of seats in the Gibraltar Parliament, as the largest party will usually form the government. Since the 2011 General Election, the Official Opposition has been the Gibraltar Social Democrats (GSD) led by Peter Caruana (2011–2013), Daniel Feetham (2013–2017), Roy Clinton as Interim Opposition Leader and now Keith Azopardi.

== Salary ==
The Leader of Opposition earns (per annum) £58,230 while other Opposition MPs and Shadow Ministers earn £34,594.

== Opposition MPs ==
The current composition of the Opposition is the following (as from 2023):

Name	Image	Party	Shadow Ministerial Portfolios (Responsibilities)
The Hon. Keith Azopardi KC, MP		GSD	Leader of the Opposition: European & International Affairs; Post-Brexit Matters; Self-Determination, Decolonisation, Sovereignty & UN Issues; Constitutional & Parliamentary Reform; Civil Rights & Governance; Public Service & MOD Industrial Relations; The Economy, Personal Status & Immigration
The Hon. Edwin Reyes, MP		GSD	Shadow Minister for Education, Employment & Culture: Education, Skills, Training & Employment; Industrial Relations & Broadcasting; Culture & Sports
The Hon. Craig Sacarello, MP		GSD	Shadow Minister for Business, Trade, Industry, Utilities & Community: Small Business, Trade & Industry; Utilities, Postal Services, Telecoms & E-Government; Community & Civic Engagement
The Hon. Atrish Sanchez, MP		GSD	Shadow Minister for Care & Opportunity: Care, Social Services & the Elderly; Elderly Residential Services (ERS) and Care Agency; Social Security, Equality, Families, Special Needs & Disabilities
The Hon. Roy Clinton, MP		GSD	Shadow Minister for Finance & Value for Money: Public Finance, Financial Stability & Value for Money; Public Sector Efficiency & Procurement; Gibraltar Savings Bank; Taxation, International Tax Agreements & Exchange of Information; Financial Services & Gaming
The Hon. Damon Bossino, MP		GSD	Shadow Minister for Housing, Lands & Heritage: Housing, Development & Planning; Urban Renewal & Land Allocation; Shipping, the Port, Heritage & Civil Aviation; Style of Government
The Hon. Joelle Ladislaus, MP		GSD	Shadow Minister for Health and Justice: Health and Public Health; Justice, Emergency Services & Civil Contingencies; The Fire Service, Police, Customs, Borders and Coastguards & the Prison Service
The Hon. Giovanni Origo, MP		GSD	Shadow Minister for Environment, Tourism, Transport & Youth: The Environment & Tourism; Young People, Transport & Civic Pride

== See also ==
- Parliamentary opposition
