= Roy Stanbrook =

Captain Roy Henry Stanbrook
- Born: 1957 (age 68–69); Surrey, England
- Died: 2022.07.14
- Education: Greenwich Royal Naval College; Warsash School of Navigation; Cranfield University - Cranfield School of Management
- Title: Chief Executive of the Gibraltar Port Authority; Captain of the Port
- Predecessor: Captain Peter Hall
- Successor: Captain Bob Sanguinetti

Captain Roy Henry Stanbrook (born 1957) was Chief Executive of the Gibraltar Port Authority and Captain of the Port in the British Overseas Territory of Gibraltar before becoming the Harbour Master of the Port of Melbourne, Victoria in April 2014. His position prior to the 2012 appointment was that of Harbour Master for the Lower District of the Port of London Authority in the United Kingdom. He was succeeded by Gibraltarian Captain Bob Sanguinetti.

== Biography ==
Roy Henry Stanbrook, a native of Surrey, England, was born in 1957. The mariner indicates that he "ran away to sea as a boy." His education included the Greenwich Royal Naval College and the Warsash School of Navigation (1975-1979). His early career included service in the Royal Fleet Auxiliary (RFA) aboard the RFA Sir Galahad (1966) during the Falklands War (1982) and other conflict areas, during which he qualified as a Master Mariner. Stanbrook also served in the first Gulf War. He gained additional maritime experience in the fields of underwater engineering, education, marine insurance, and vessel management. He was employed by BT Marine, working on cable ships. At Warsash Maritime Academy, part of Southampton Solent University, Stanbrook taught radar, vessel handling, and bridge team management, and became a Senior Lecturer. He was a surveyor for the protection and indemnity insurance (P&I) club, British Marine Mutual. In addition, he was Operations Director for the Rochester-based shipping company, R Lapthorn and Company Ltd, his last position before joining the Port of London Authority (PLA).

In 2001, Stanbrook was appointed as the Deputy Harbour Master on the River Thames for the Lower District of the Port of London Authority. In 2007, he was selected as Harbour Master for the Lower District of the Port of London Authority, the area of his responsibility the lower tidal Thames. He succeeded Gordon Dickins, who retired from the Port of London Authority after having served in a number of senior positions over a period of 32 years. Stanbrook was in an advanced development programme at the Cranfield School of Management of Cranfield University in 2007–2008. On 27 February 2012, the 54-year-old assumed his most recent position, that of Chief Executive of the Gibraltar Port Authority and Captain of the Port. The selection process was completed in November of the previous year. His predecessor in Gibraltar was Captain Peter W. Hall, who served in that position from August 2008 to October 2011, after having unexpectedly resigned in September 2011.

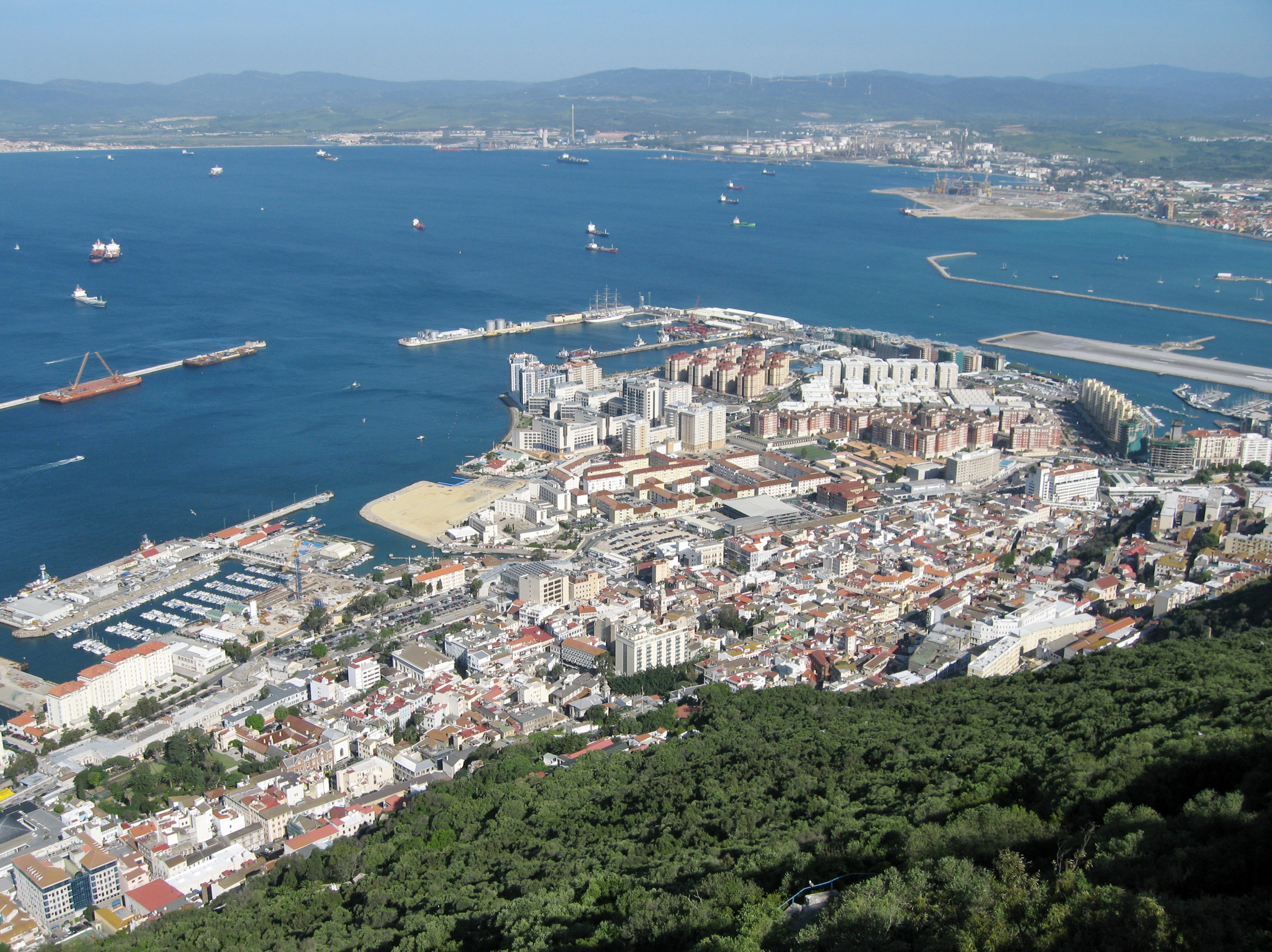
The North Mole at Gibraltar Harbour is the site of the Gibraltar Port Authority.

Captain Stanbrook, a married father of two, is a Fellow of the Nautical Institute (FNI), an international organization for maritime professionals. He is a Younger Brother of Trinity House, the general lighthouse authority for England, Wales, the Channel Islands, and Gibraltar. He has an STCW (Standards of Training, Certification & Watchkeeping) Master Unlimited Certificate of Competency. On 19 March 2010, Stanbrook was appointed as a director of the Cambria Trust, the charity that owns the Thames sailing barge Cambria. He has resided in Rochester, Kent, England.

Neil Costa, Minister for Tourism, Public Transport and the Port, and chairman of the board of directors of the Gibraltar Port Authority, commented on his selection of Stanbrook to lead the Gibraltar Port Authority. "The Government is determined to see growth and development in the various sectors of port operations and will be looking to the Captain to provide the necessary leadership to achieve this." In Gibraltar, the commercial port's primary activity is bunkering; Alan Cubbin of the Gibraltar Maritime Administration has noted improvement to the process of booking bunkering slots at Gibraltar in 2012. "A year ago, it wasn’t unusual for ships to sit out for 24 hours whereas now, they’re booking three days ahead and it’s very efficient."

In April 2014, Captain Sanbrook was appointed Harbour Master for the Port of Melbourne, a position he remained in until his retirement in January 2020.

Captain Roy Stanbrook died on 14 July 2022, from a pulmonary embolism.
