= Gibraltar Port Authority =

Government agency of Gibraltar

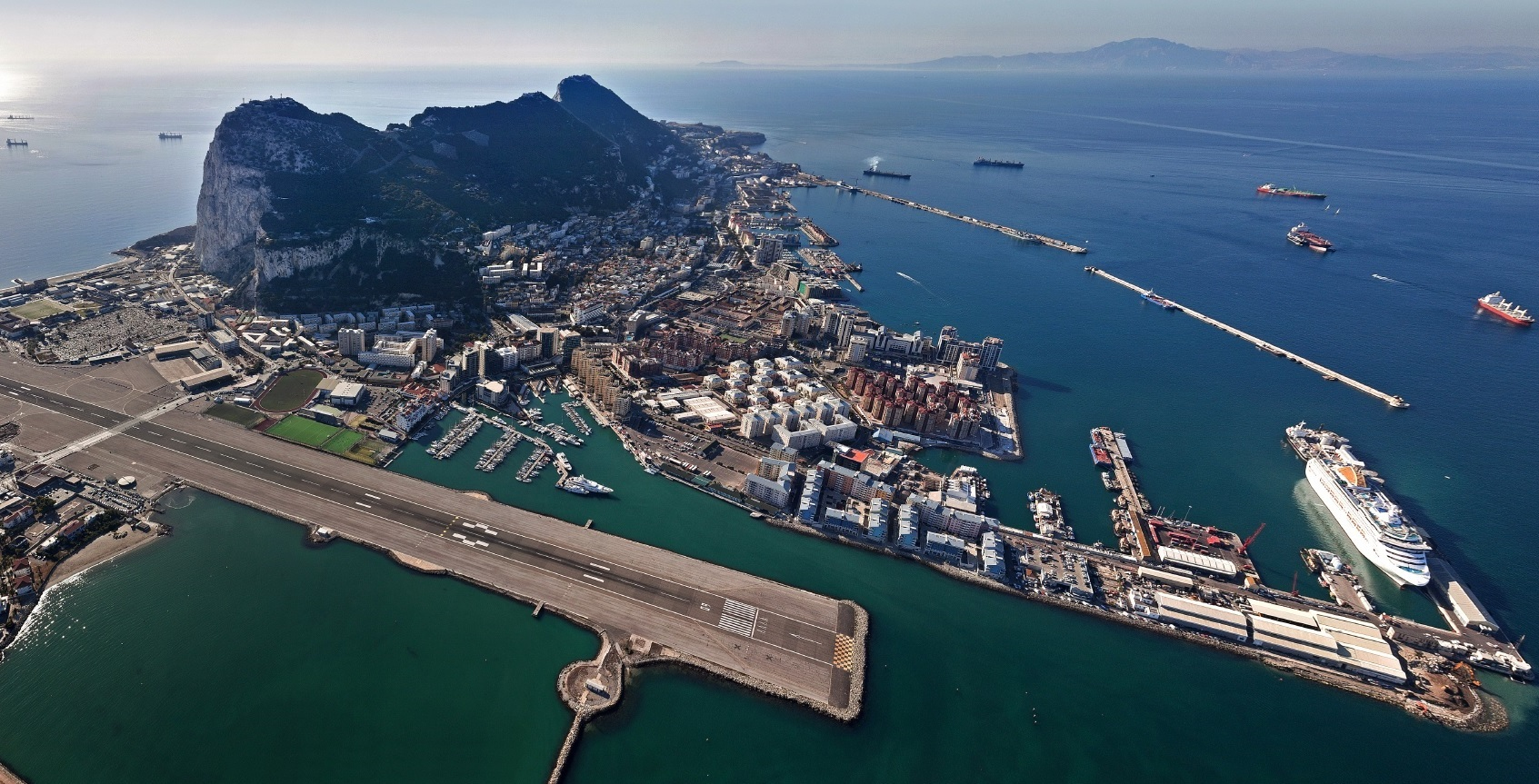

Agency overview
- Formed: 1806
- Jurisdiction: British Gibraltar Territorial Waters
- Headquarters: North Mole, Gibraltar Harbour, Gibraltar; 36.148453°N 5.365174°W
- Motto: Gateway to the Mediterranean
- Minister responsible: Neil F. Costa, Minister for Tourism, Public Transport, and the Port
- Agency executive: Bob Sanguinetti, Chief Executive Captain of the Port
- Key document: Gibraltar Port Authority Act 2005
- Website: www.gibraltarport.com

The Gibraltar Port Authority develops and manages the Port of Gibraltar.

== History ==
On 19 February 1706, Anne, Queen of Great Britain, granted free-port status to Gibraltar. In the early 18th century, Gibraltar was principally a garrison where commerce was negligible.

Following the 1805 Battle of Trafalgar, Gibraltar was established as a port for international trade. The government-administered Gibraltar Port Authority was founded in 1806.

In 1823, the first steamship appeared in the Gibraltar Port which gradually evolved into a bunkering port.

The independent Gibraltar Port Authority was established in 2005 by the Gibraltar Port Authority Act. The act of Parliament also provided for the transfer of some responsibilities from the Government of Gibraltar to the Authority. Members of the Authority were appointed, effective 1 June 2006. In 2005/2006, GPA's total revenue was £583,900, and its total expenditure £519,816.59.

In July 2016, the GPA offloaded Tomahawk missiles, Spearfish torpedoes and Harpoon anti-ship missiles from a British nuclear-powered submarine that was damaged after colliding with a merchant vessel in the port of Gibraltar. The British authorities did not provide extensive information on this operation, which created tension with Spanish authorities. In August 2016, the GPA signed a deal with Shell to study the implementation of LNG bunkering infrastructures in the port.

In February 2017, the GPA impounded the super yacht of Russian billionaire Andrey Melnichenko. In March 2017, the GPA expressed its concerns regarding the Brexit because its fuel reserves are located in the port of Algeciras, the Spanish coastal city facing Gibraltar.

== Description ==
Map of Gibraltar

=== Main functions ===
- Monitor and control all vessel movements for British Gibraltar Territorial Waters (BGTW) in support of port operations and navigational safety;
- Provision and monitoring of port security including provision of security controls within restricted and controlled zones;
- The licensing of Port operations;
- Search and Rescue in British Gibraltar Territorial Waters (BGTW);
- Pollution prevention and response;
- Monitoring and control of ship-to-ship and bunkering operations within BGTW.

From 1997 to 2007, the GPA went from 27 registered ships to 236.

=== Activities ===
All operational matters including navigational safety and the smooth running of the Port are overseen by the Captain of the Port. The principal services provided within Gibraltar Port are bunkering (supply of fuel to vessels) and cruise liner calls.

For the bunkering, the fuel is delivered by bunker barge to a vessel anchored in the Bay of Gibraltar or delivered to vessels alongside a berth where multiple shore fuelling stations are located.

Gibraltar is a popular tourist destination for cruise liner calls due to its location at the entrance to the Mediterranean. The vast majority of all cruise liner calls to Gibraltar come alongside the primary quayside, the North Mole, Western Arm, which makes access into town convenient for passengers and crew alike. Approximately 270,000 to 300,000 cruise liner passengers transit through the port annually.

Other services include the supply & provisions for transiting vessels, crew changes, a Gibraltar-Morocco ferry service, ship repairs (see Gibdock), lub-oils delivery, slops/waste discharge, class surveys, underwater cleaning/survey, Ship-to-Ship transfers.

=== Surveillance ===
The GPA employs a high specification Vessel Traffic Services (VTS) system. Supported by multiple radars and high-powered cameras, positioned in strategic locations around the Rock of Gibraltar, the VTS centre monitors the surrounding waters with high levels of accuracy on a 24/7 basis.

== Governance ==
- Chairman of the board: Neil Costa, Minister for Tourism, Public Transport and the Port (since December 2011)
- Chief Executive and Captain of the Port: Bob Sanguinetti (since 19 May 2014)

The Port's office is located on the North Mole, at the northern end of Gibraltar Harbour.
