= 2021 Gibraltar abortion referendum =

24 June 2021
- Should the Crimes (Amendment) Act 2019, that defines the circumstances which would allow abortion in Gibraltar, come into force?

Results
Choice	Votes	%
Yes	7,656	62.88%
No	4,520	37.12%
Valid votes	12,176	98.65%
Invalid or blank votes	167	1.35%
Total votes	12,343	100.00%
Registered voters/turnout	23,343	52.88%

A referendum on partially legalising abortion was held in Gibraltar on 24 June 2021. The referendum question was whether to enact the Crimes (Amendment) Act 2019, which allows abortions up to 12 weeks if the woman's mental or physical health is at risk. It also allows abortion later if the woman's life is at risk, to prevent "grave permanent" mental or physical injury, or if there is a fatal fetal abnormality. It had originally been scheduled for 19 March 2020, but was postponed on 12 March 2020 due to the COVID-19 pandemic. The proposal was approved by 63% of voters.

== Background ==
On 12 July 2019, the Gibraltar Parliament passed the Crimes (Amendment) Act 2019 (which allows abortions in certain circumstances) by a vote of 10–7. Abortion was allowed under the following conditions, subject to its approval in the referendum:

a that the pregnancy has not exceeded its twelfth week and that the continuance of the pregnancy would involve risk, greater than if the pregnancy were terminated, of injury to the physical or mental health of the pregnant woman; or

(b) that the termination is necessary to prevent grave permanent injury to the physical or mental health of the pregnant woman; or

(c) that the continuance of the pregnancy would involve risk to the life of the pregnant woman, greater than if the pregnancy were terminated; or

(d) that there is a substantial risk that the foetus is suffering from a fatal foetal abnormality.

Nine of the ten MPs from the GSLP–Liberal Alliance, as well as the one Together Gibraltar MP, voted in favour. GSLP MP Albert Isola voted against the bill together with the six Gibraltar Social Democrat MPs. Seeking to establish popular support for the proposal, MPs unanimously approved a referendum on the legislation, with the government deciding the date. Following the victory of the ruling coalition in the October 2019 general elections, the government decided on 19 December to schedule the referendum for 19 March 2020. The government also decided to lower the voting age for the referendum to 16. The ballot question was set as "Should the Crimes Amendment Act 2019, that defines the circumstances which would allow abortion in Gibraltar, come into force?"

== Campaign ==
Government funding of up to £50,000 was provided for the "yes" and "no" campaigns, with each campaign limited to spending £50,000 in total.

A "Gibraltar for Yes" group was formed to campaign in favour of the change, consisting of Choice Gibraltar, Feminist Gibraltar, No More Shame Gibraltar, and the Secular Humanist Society of Gibraltar. The group was backed by Chief Minister Fabian Picardo, Together Gibraltar (including Marlene Hassan Nahon, who bought up the debate), GSLP/Libs and its MPs (except Albert Isola), and GSD MP Elliot Phillips.

The Gibraltar Pro-Life Movement ("GPLM") opposed the change. In June 2021 it accused Picardo of making misleading statements about the new law. The group was supported by GSD and its MPs (except Elliot Phillips) and GSLP/Libs MP, Albert Isola.

== Results ==
On 25 June it was announced by GBC News that the referendum proposal had been approved by voters. Chief Minister Fabian Picardo stated that the government would bring the Crimes Amendment Act 2019 into effect within 28 days, and promised to "introduce counselling and support services".

Choice	Votes	%
For	7,656	62.88
Against	4,520	37.12
Total	12,176	100.00
Valid votes	12,176	98.65
Invalid/blank votes	167	1.35
Total votes	12,343	100.00
Registered voters/turnout	23,343	52.88
Source: Gibraltar Parliament, GBC

== See also ==
- Abortion in Gibraltar
