= BGTW =

BGTW may refer to:

- British Gibraltar Territorial Waters
- British Guild of Travel Writers
