= Stanbrook =

Stanbrook is a surname. Notable people with the surname include:

- Clive Stanbrook (1948–2018), British barrister
- Ivor Stanbrook (1924–2004), British politician
- Roy Stanbrook (born 1957), Chief Executive of the Gibraltar Port Authority
- Stan Stanbrook (born 1972), Sedimentologist

== See also ==
- Stanbrook Abbey, former abbey in Worcestershire, England; community now moved to North Yorkshire
- SS Stanbrook, a British steamship built in 1909
