= Keith Azopardi =

Gibraltarian politician (born 1967)

The Honourable Keith Azopardi KC MP
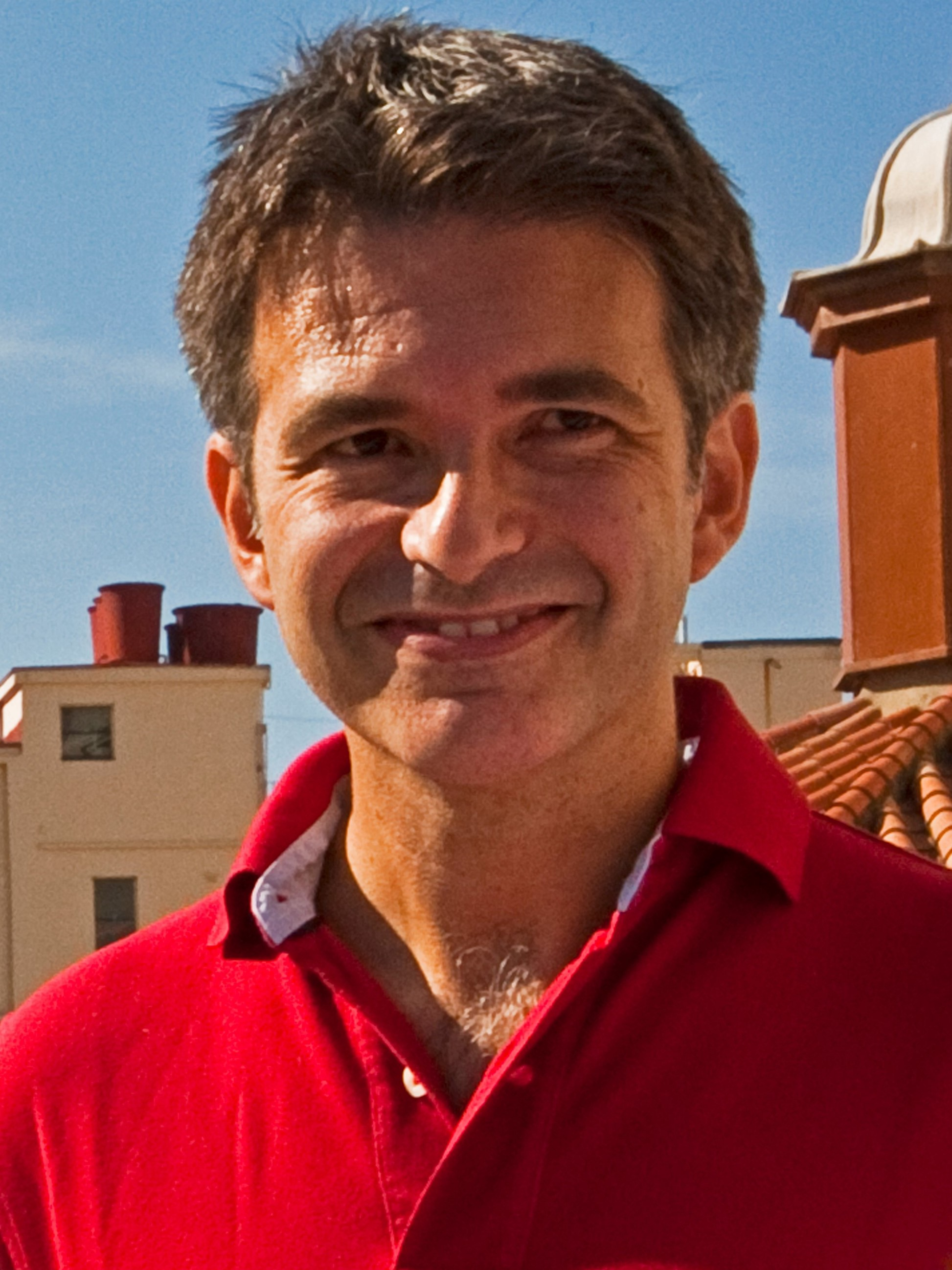
- Azopardi in 2011

Leader of the Opposition
- Incumbent
- Assumed office 30 November 2017
- Monarchs: Elizabeth II; Charles III
- Deputy: Roy Clinton; Elliott Phillips
- Preceded by: Daniel Feetham

Member of the Parliament of Gibraltar
- In office 17 October 2019
- In office 16 May 1996 – 28 November 2003

Deputy Chief Minister of Gibraltar
- Monarch: Elizabeth II
- Governor: Sir Richard Luce; David Durie
- Succeeded by: Joseph Holiday

Personal details
- Born: 6 June 1967 (age 58) Gibraltar
- Party: Gibraltar Social Democrats (1996–2003, 2017–present)
- Other political affiliations: Progressive Democratic Party (Gibraltar) (2006–2012); Gibraltar Liberal Party (formerly the Gibraltar National Party) (1992–1996)
- Occupation: Politician
- Profession: Lawyer

Keith Azopardi is a Gibraltarian lawyer and politician serving as Leader of the Opposition and Leader of the Gibraltar Social Democrats since 2017.

He was born in Gibraltar on 6 June 1967 and was called to the Bars of England, Wales and Gibraltar in 1990. He is of Maltese descent.

He was a founder member of the Gibraltar National Party (which later became the Gibraltar Liberal Party) in December 1991. He later contested the 1992 general election as a candidate for that party, although he was not elected to Parliament.

He served as minister for environment and health for the Gibraltar Social Democrats from 1996 to 2000, after which he was appointed deputy chief minister of Gibraltar and minister for trade and industry, a position he held until 2003.

He stood down from politics in 2003 but later founded the Progressive Democratic Party in June 2006. He was also involved in the negotiations with the British government that led to the grant of the new Gibraltar Constitution of 2006.

In October 2009, Azopardi published a book "Sovereignty and the Stateless Nation: Gibraltar in the Modern Legal Context" (Hart Publishing ISBN 978-1-84113-916-6) discussing the constitutional status of Gibraltar, and proposing ways forward to achieve an enduring settlement to the dispute with Spain.

In July 2017, he rejoined with the GSD and has represented himself as candidate for 2017 Gibraltar Social Democrats leadership election, opposing Roy Clinton. He won the elections and became the new leader of the GSD in 30 November 2017.

Azopardi led the party into the 2019 election, focusing on the theme of "The Gibraltar You Deserve" but ultimately was defeated by the incumbent GSLP-Liberals under the leadership of chief minister Fabian Picardo who won a third term in office. The party suffered the loss of a seat to Together Gibraltar, who won their first ever seat in parliament, and an overall decrease in their share of the vote by 6.01%.

Following the 2019 election, Azopardi remained as party leader and served as leader of the opposition again during the 13th Parliament of Gibraltar. He took the party into the 2023 election, and polling throughout the campaign showed the GSD narrowly ahead and at times statistically tied with the GSLP-Liberals. The party focused their campaign on the theme of change after eleven years of Fabian Picardo serving as chief minister, using the slogan "Make The Change For a Bright Future". Despite the GBC exit poll on election night suggesting an incredibly narrow victory for the party with Keith Azopardi expected to become chief minister, ultimately once the votes had been counted the party fell short of government and Fabian Picardo and the GSLP-Liberals won a fourth consecutive term in office. Despite suffering a surprising defeat, the party gained two seats and increased their vote share by 22.6% and made political history in Gibraltar by becoming the first opposition to hold eight seats versus the traditional seven seats the opposition have won in previous elections.

== See also ==
- List of Gibraltarians
- Politics of Gibraltar
