= Abortion in Gibraltar =

Abortion in Gibraltar is allowed up to 12 weeks if the woman's mental or physical health is at risk. Gibraltar also allows abortion later if the woman's life is at risk, to prevent "grave permanent" mental or physical injury, or there is a fatal fetal abnormality.

Until 2021, the British Overseas Territory of Gibraltar had the strictest prohibition on abortion in Europe. Under Section 16 of the 2011 Crime Act, it stated that abortion in Gibraltar was punishable by life imprisonment including anyone assisting in the abortion. However, nobody was convicted of this crime in modern times.

In 2021, the 2021 Gibraltar abortion referendum was held, asking the populace whether to legalise abortion via ratification of the Crimes (Amendment) Act 2019. It won the approval of 63% of voters. Under the new law, there are four conditions under which abortions are legalised:

a that the pregnancy has not exceeded its twelfth week and that the continuance of the pregnancy would involve risk, greater than if the pregnancy were terminated, of injury to the physical or mental health of the pregnant woman; or

(b) that the termination is necessary to prevent grave permanent injury to the physical or mental health of the pregnant woman; or

(c) that the continuance of the pregnancy would involve risk to the life of the pregnant woman, greater than if the pregnancy were terminated; or

(d) that there is a substantial risk that the foetus is suffering from a fatal foetal abnormality.

== See also ==
- 2021 Gibraltar abortion referendum
