= Nigel Feetham =

Gibraltarian politician and lawyer

The Honourable Nigel Feetham KC MP

Minister for Justice, Trade and Industry
- Incumbent
- Assumed office 13 October 2023

Member of the Parliament of Gibraltar
- Incumbent
- Assumed office 12 October 2023

Personal details
- Party: Gibraltar Socialist Labour Party

Nigel Feetham is a Gibraltarian barrister, author and politician. A member of the Gibraltar Socialist Labour Party (GSLP), he was elected to the Gibraltar Parliament at the 2023 general election, and he currently serves as Minister for Justice, Trade and Industry in Chief Minister Fabian Picardo's GSLP–Liberal Alliance administration.

== Education and legal career ==
According to a biography supplied by Hassans, Feetham graduated from Manchester Metropolitan University with a First Class Honours degree, followed by a Masters degree in Law with Distinction from the Victoria University of Manchester.

Called to the bar in 1993, Feetham became a partner at Hassans in 1999. He later became a visiting professor at Nottingham Law School from 2011 to 2017, and was elevated to the rank of Queen’s Counsel in 2019. He has written or co-authored several books, including Protected Cell Companies: a Guide to their Implementation and Use. He was also a member of the Gibraltar Financial Services Commission.

== Political career ==
Before becoming a member of the GSLP, Feetham was a member of the centre-right Gibraltar Social Democrats, the main opposition party. The party was led by his brother, Daniel Feetham, from 2013 to 2017, and Nigel served on its executive.

Feetham stood as a GSLP candidate in 2023 Gibraltar general election, his nomination proposed by Albert Isola and seconded by Fabian Picardo. He came 5th of 17 candidates elected, and was subsequently appointed Minister for Justice, Trade and Industry.

After Picardo announced his fourth term as Chief Minister would be his last, Feetham publicly declared his interest in standing at the next leadership election, arguing that he had "the electoral appeal to appeal to the broadest section of our community, cutting across party lines", and that he would campaign from a platform of fiscal restraint. However, he acknowledged the perception that Picardo was favouring Gemma Arias-Vasquez, and after Picardo confirmed he was standing down in 2026, Feetham announced in a joint statement with Arias-Vasquez that he would not stand, would support her candidacy by citing party unity, but would take on an enhanced role in government for the economy and as Vice Deputy Chief Minister - as the Deputy Chief Minister is currently a member of the Liberal Party of Gibraltar, the role of Vice Deputy Chief Minister would effectively serve as Arias-Vasquez's party deputy in government.

== Personal life ==
Nigel is part of the Feetham political family - his father, Michael, was a former trade and industry minister under GSLP Chief Minister Joe Bossano, whilst his brother, Daniel Feetham, served as leader of the opposition Gibraltar Social Democrats, and also served as a justice minister.
