= 2026 Gibraltar Socialist Labour Party leadership election =

Election for new leader to succeed Fabian Picardo

- 1 December 2026
Candidate	Gemma Arias-Vasquez
Incumbent Leader
Fabian Picardo

The 2026 Gibraltar Socialist Labour Party leadership election is to be held on 1 December 2026 to elect a new leader of the Gibraltar Socialist Labour Party (GSLP), after incumbent Fabian Picardo announced his retirement. As the GSLP-led Alliance holds a majority in the Gibraltar Parliament, the winner is presumed to become the next Chief Minister of Gibraltar.

== Background ==
Fabian Picardo has been the Leader of the Gibraltar Socialist Labour Party (GSLP) since taking over from Joe Bossano in 2011. Winning the 2011 Gibraltar general election, Picardo has since served as Chief Minister of Gibraltar for nearly 15 years.

During the campaign for the 2023 Gibraltar general election, Picardo indicated that a fourth term as Chief Minister would be his last. In June 2024, he reconfirmed his position, though he did not specify when he would retire. In June 2026, Picardo announced he would retire at the party's 2026 annual general meeting.

== Procedure ==
The GSLP elects its leader for a two-year term, though it has never had a contested leadership battle in its history, and the last election of note was in 2011 when Picardo succeeded Bossano unchallenged. At the party's 2024 AGM, Picardo was re-elected leader unopposed.

In announcing his resignation, Picardo confirmed the 2026 AGM would take place in November or December.

== Candidates ==
Gemma Arias-Vasquez, Minister for Health, Care and Business, is the only confirmed candidate, and would become the party's first female leader if elected and Gibraltar's first female Chief Minister if appointed. Arias-Vasquez was touted as the next leader even before her election as an MP in 2023, with Picardo saying during the campaign, sitting alongside her, "if today I had to nominate somebody to be the next leader of the GSLP, I think she's going to be a woman and I think she is sitting at this table."

Nigel Feetham, Minister for Justice, Trade and Industry, indicated in June 2024 that he would stand if he felt he had the support of the party membership. In June 2026, Feetham decided not to stand, instead backing Arias-Vasquez, stating his decision was made in the interest of party unity. In a joint statement, Arias-Vasquez pledged to appoint Feetham Vice Deputy Chief Minister - as the Deputy Chief Minister is usually given to the junior coalition partner, Vice Deputy Chief Minister would effectively make Feetham her party deputy in government.

The 'joint ticket' of Arias-Vasquez and Feetham was subsequently endorsed by Picardo.
