= Neil Costa =

Gibraltarian barrister and politician

Neil Francis Costa MP
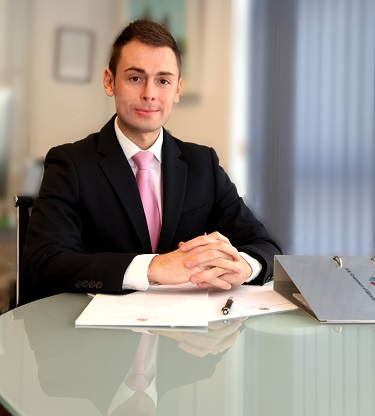

Minister for Health, Care and Justice
- In office 2011–2019

Shadow Minister for Health and Social Services
- In office 2007–2011

Personal details
- Born: Gibraltar
- Party: Liberal Party of Gibraltar (LPG)
- Education: University of Edinburgh; University of Oxford
- Occupation: Barrister; Politician
- Website: www.gibraltarlawyers.com/people/neil-costa

Neil Francis Costa is a Gibraltarian barrister and former politician (2007-2019) affiliated to the Liberal Party of Gibraltar (LPG). In December 2011 he was elected an MP to the Gibraltar Parliament and was elected Minister for Tourism, Public Transport, Commercial Affairs and the Port. After the Ministerial reshuffle of December 2014, he became Minister for Business and Employment. In October 2016, he was appointed Minister for Health, Care and Justice. In October 2019, Costa confirmed his decision that he would not seek re-election and returned to work as a barrister.

== Biography ==
Costa was born in Gibraltar into a working-class family. He grew up in the government flat which his parents shared with his grandparents and other family members. His father was a stonemason and his mother a cashier at supermarket. He stood out when he obtained three A grades, two with Distinction, at A-level at Bayside Comprehensive School. He went on to study law and Spanish at the University of Wales in Cardiff where he graduated with honours. Costa completed his law studies at the Inns of Court School of Law in London, was admitted to the bar in London in November 2002 and to the Gibraltar bar in January 2003. In 2016, Costa embarked on an LL.M. in Law from the University of Edinburgh, obtaining a Distinction in October 2019.

Costa has been involved in the politics of Gibraltar since his student days, and he joined the Liberal Party of Gibraltar in 1999. In 2007, he was elected to Parliament and became Shadow Minister for Health and Social Services. In 2011, along with Dr. Joseph Garcia and Steven Linares, formed the group of LPG candidates who stood in alliance with the Gibraltar Socialist Labour Party (GSLP) to contest the 2011 general elections.

Re-elected to parliament in 2011, this time in government, Costa was appointed by Chief Minister Fabian Picardo as Minister for Tourism, Public Transport, Commercial Affairs and the Port.

After the Ministerial reshuffle in December 2014, Costa was appointed Minister for Business and Employment. In October 2016, he was appointed Minister for Health, Care and Justice.

In September 2019, Costa announced that he would not stand in the 2019 Gibraltar general election. After the election he resumed his legal career.

In November 2021, Costa graduated from Oxford University, New College, with Distinction in his Master of Studies in International Human Rights Law. Neil was awarded the Morris Prize for the highest overall grade for the year and for the highest grade in the dissertation.
