= Daniel Feetham =

Gibraltarian lawyer and former politician

The Honourable Daniel Feetham KC MP
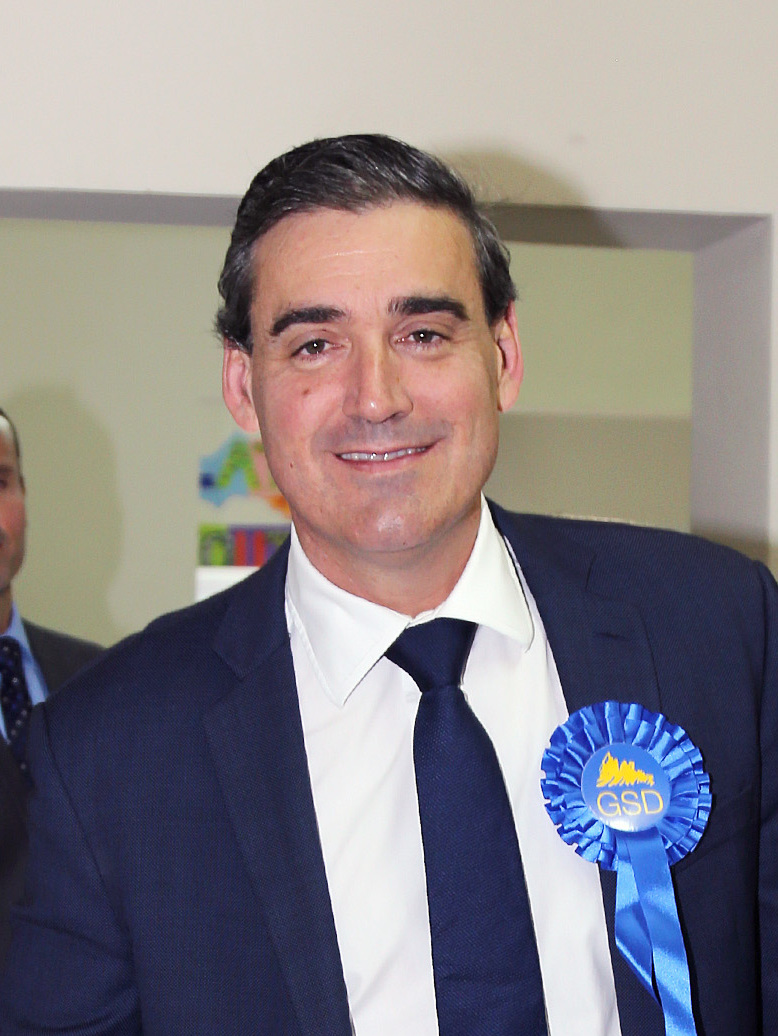
- Daniel Feetham, Leader of the Opposition, in 2015

Leader of the Opposition
- In office 10 January 2013 – 30 November 2017
- Monarch: Elizabeth II
- Prime Minister: Fabian Picardo
- Deputy: Roy Clinton
- Preceded by: Peter Caruana
- Succeeded by: Keith Azopardi

Minister for Justice
- In office 2007–2011

Personal details
- Born: Gibraltar
- Party: Gibraltar Social Democrats (since 2005)
- Other political affiliations: GSLP (2000-2001); Gibraltar Labour Party (2001-2005; merged with GSD)

Daniel Anthony Feetham KC MP is a Gibraltarian lawyer and former politician who served as Leader of the Opposition and Leader of the Gibraltar Social Democrats (GSD) from 2013 to 2017.

== Political career ==
Mr Feetham was, until he stepped down in Oct 2023, the longest serving Member of Parliament on the Opposition benches. He served as Minister for Justice from 2007-2011 and was a member of the Gibraltar Social Democrats (the GSD) a centre right political party in Gibraltar.

His father Michael Feetham and brother Nigel Feetham have both been Members of Parliament but on the socialist side of the political spectrum. His father, a Trade Unionist, was a leading member of the Gibraltar Socialist Labour Party (the GSLP) and served as Minister for Trade and Industry from 1988-1996. His brother Nigel Feetham is currently a Government Minister for the GSLP having been elected for the first time in 2023 and holds both the portfolios that his father Michael (Trade and Industry) and Daniel (Justice) held. Both Daniel and Nigel Feetham are barristers and Kings Counsel.

Daniel Feetham had been active in politics since 2000. He addressed the UN Fourth Committee on the decolonisation of Gibraltar in 2002 and 2003 advocating devolved integration with the United Kingdom. In 2004, he introduced the then leader of the Conservative Party, Michael Howard, to the international press for the launch of the first European Elections in which Gibraltar was allowed to vote as part of the South West of England region and helped manage the campaign in Gibraltar for the Conservative Party. The Conservative Party polled over two-thirds of the Gibraltar vote, with no other party exceeding 10% support. From 2004 to 2006 he was a member of the Gibraltar delegation that negotiated a new Constitution with the UK and co-ordinated the yes vote campaign in the referendum on the new Constitution in 2006. The new Constitution was adopted in Gibraltar in 2007.

He served as Gibraltar's first Minister of Justice from 2007 to 2011 with the GSD. During his time as Minister for Justice he introduced extensive reforms to criminal justice and legal system. He is also credited for the equalization of the age of consent between heterosexuals, which stood at 16 years and homosexual men, which stood at 18 years old. To do so he presented a private members bill, and openly stated in parliament that the disparity was not constitutional. Although the bill was defeated it eventually led to his own Government putting the matter before the Gibraltar Supreme Court, which agreed with Mr Feetham that the disparity was not constitutional.

In the 2011 general election the GSD was defeated by a very narrow margin and Mr Feetham was elected to Parliament 52 votes behind the then leader Peter Caruana. The GSD had been in Government for 16 years before that defeat. Mr Feetham became deputy leader of the GSD in 2012 and in February 2013 he was elected as leader of the GSD and became Leader of the Opposition until June 2017. In Opposition the GSD voted in favour of socially progressive measures such as civil partnerships and same sex marriage. The party however advocated fiscally conservative policies and Mr Feetham vociferously criticized the GSLP-Liberal Government’s policy on debt and Government spending.

On 2 November 2010, Mr Feetham was stabbed in the back while out walking in Library Street with his children. Police arrested the attacker while the Minister underwent emergency surgery in St. Bernard's Hospital. His attacker was on bail at the time on charges of attempted murder of a doctor at St Bernard's Hospital and stabbed Mr Feetham because he had been declined, by a judge, legal aid to retain an English QC to represent him rather than having local representation. The knife attack cut his spleen in half which had to be removed. Despite the serious nature of the attack Mr Feetham survived. The attacker is serving a life sentence.

Daniel Feetham was appointed one of Her Majesty's Counsel in December 2016. He is now the Managing Director of London Law Firm, Madison Legal and practices as a barrister from 3 Hare Court in Temple. He is also a partner in largest law firm in Gibraltar, Hassans International Law Firm.

== Elections ==
In 2003, he contested the General Election as leader of the Gibraltar Labour Party which later merged with the GSD.

In 2007, he contested the General Election as a candidate for the GSD. He was elected as an MP and as Minister for Justice.

In 2013, he contested the leadership of the GSD after Peter Caruana stood down. He beat his opponent Damon Bossino and was elected GSD Leader and subsequently as Leader of the Opposition.

== Personal life ==
He has 3 children. Two of his children are also lawyers. His brother, Nigel Feetham KC, was a Legal Partner (and Head of Financial Services) at Hassans and is now serving as an MP and Minister for Trade and Industry, Financial Services, Gaming and Justice (the latter that Daniel served as the inaugural minister from 2007 to 2011) with the GSLP-Liberal Government since the 2023 Gibraltar general election.

== See also ==
- List of Gibraltarians
- Politics of Gibraltar
