= Parliamentary opposition =

Form of political opposition within a parliamentary system of government

Parliamentary opposition is a form of political opposition to a designated government, particularly in a Westminster-based parliamentary system. This article uses the term government as it is used in parliamentary systems, i.e. meaning the administration or the cabinet rather than the state. In some countries, the title of "Official Opposition" is conferred upon the largest political party sitting in opposition in the legislature, with said party's leader being accorded the title "Leader of the Opposition".

In first-past-the-post assemblies, where the tendency to gravitate into two major parties or party groupings operates strongly, government and opposition roles can go to the two main groupings serially in alternation.

The more proportionally representative a system, the greater the likelihood of multiple political parties appearing in the parliamentary debating chamber. Such systems can foster multiple "opposition" parties which may have little in common and minimal desire to form a united bloc opposed to the government of the day.

Some well-organised democracies, dominated long-term by a single faction, reduce their parliamentary opposition to tokenism. In some cases, in more authoritarian countries, tame "opposition" parties are created by the governing groups in order to create an impression of democratic debate.

Some legislatures offer opposition parties particular powers. In Canada, the United Kingdom, and New Zealand, 20 days each year are set aside as "Opposition Days" or "Supply Days", during which the opposition gets to set the agenda. Canada and Australia also have a Question Period or a Question Time, during which the opposition (and the Parliament generally) can ask questions of government ministers.

== Examples ==
Country	Opposition
Australia	Opposition (Australia)
Canada	Official Opposition (Canada)
Croatia	Opposition (Croatia)
Gibraltar	His Majesty's Most Loyal Opposition (Gibraltar)
Hungary	Opposition Party (Hungary)
Ireland	Opposition Front Bench (Ireland)
Malaysia	Opposition (Malaysia)
New Zealand	Official Opposition (New Zealand)
South Africa	Official Opposition Shadow Cabinet (South Africa)
United Kingdom	His Majesty's Most Loyal Opposition (United Kingdom)

== See also ==
- Loyal opposition
- Controlled opposition
- Pro-democracy camp and Localist camp (opposition camps in Hong Kong)
- Ruling party
- Shadow cabinet
- The Establishment
