= Ulrich Lins =

German historian and Esperantist

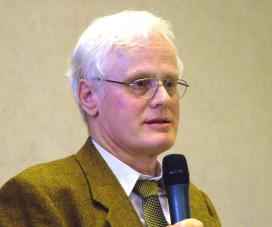
- Born: 4 August 1943 (age 83); Bonn, Germany
- Education: University of Bonn; University of Cologne; University of Tokyo
- Occupations: Historian; author; linguist
- Board member of: Universal Esperanto Association (1986–c. 1996)

Ulrich Lins (born 4 August 1943) is a German historian.

== Biography ==
Ulrich Lins was born on 4 August 1943 in Bonn, Germany.

Lins studied history, political science, and Japanology at the universities of Bonn and Cologne. In 1971 and 1972, he was an observer at the University of Tokyo and completed his doctoral thesis on the history of the Oomoto sect.

Lins was a member of the board of the World Esperanto Youth Organization (TEJO) from 1964–1969, and represented the organisation on the board of the Universal Esperanto Association from 1967–1969. He was the co-editor of the magazine Kontakto (with Simo Milojevic) from 1970–1974. He became a member of the board of the Universal Esperanto Association in 1986, and served as its vice-president from 1989-1995.

== Selected published works ==
- Lins, Ulrich (10 February 2017) [1973, 1988, 1990]. La Danĝera Lingvo [Dangerous Language — Esperanto under Hitler and Stalin] (in Esperanto, Japanese, German, Italian, and Russian). Springer. ISBN 978-1-137-54917-4.
- Lins, Ulrich; Lapenna, Ivo; Carlevaro, Tazio, eds. (1974). Esperanto en perspektivo (in Esperanto).
- Lins, Ulrich, ed. (1977). German-Japanese relations (in German).
- Lins, Ulrich. Die Ōmoto-Bewegung und der radikale Nationalismus in Japan (in German).
- Lins, Ulrich (ed.). History of Germany (in Japanese). Vol. 1–2.
