= Edwin Reyes (Gibraltarian politician) =

Gibraltarian Politician

The Honourable Edwin Reyes MP

Government Minister Minister for Culture
- In office 2007–2011
- Preceded by: Fabian Vinet
- Succeeded by: Steven Linares

HM Opposition Shadow Minister for Education, Culture and Sport
- Incumbent
- Assumed office since 2011

Personal details
- Born: Gibraltar
- Party: Gibraltar Social Democrats (GSD) (since 2007)

Edwin Joseph Reyes is a Gibraltarian politician and an MP in the Gibraltar Parliament for the Gibraltar Social Democrats (GSD).

Reyes was first elected to parliament during the 2007 Gibraltar general election after which he served as Minister for Culture and later Housing under the cabinet of Peter Caruana. Since the GSD was put into opposition following the 2011 election, Reyes has served as Shadow Minister and spokesman for education.

== See also ==
- List of Gibraltarians
- Politics of Gibraltar
