= John Cortes (Gibraltarian politician) =

Gibraltarian politician

The Hon. Prof. John Emmanuel Cortes MBE MP
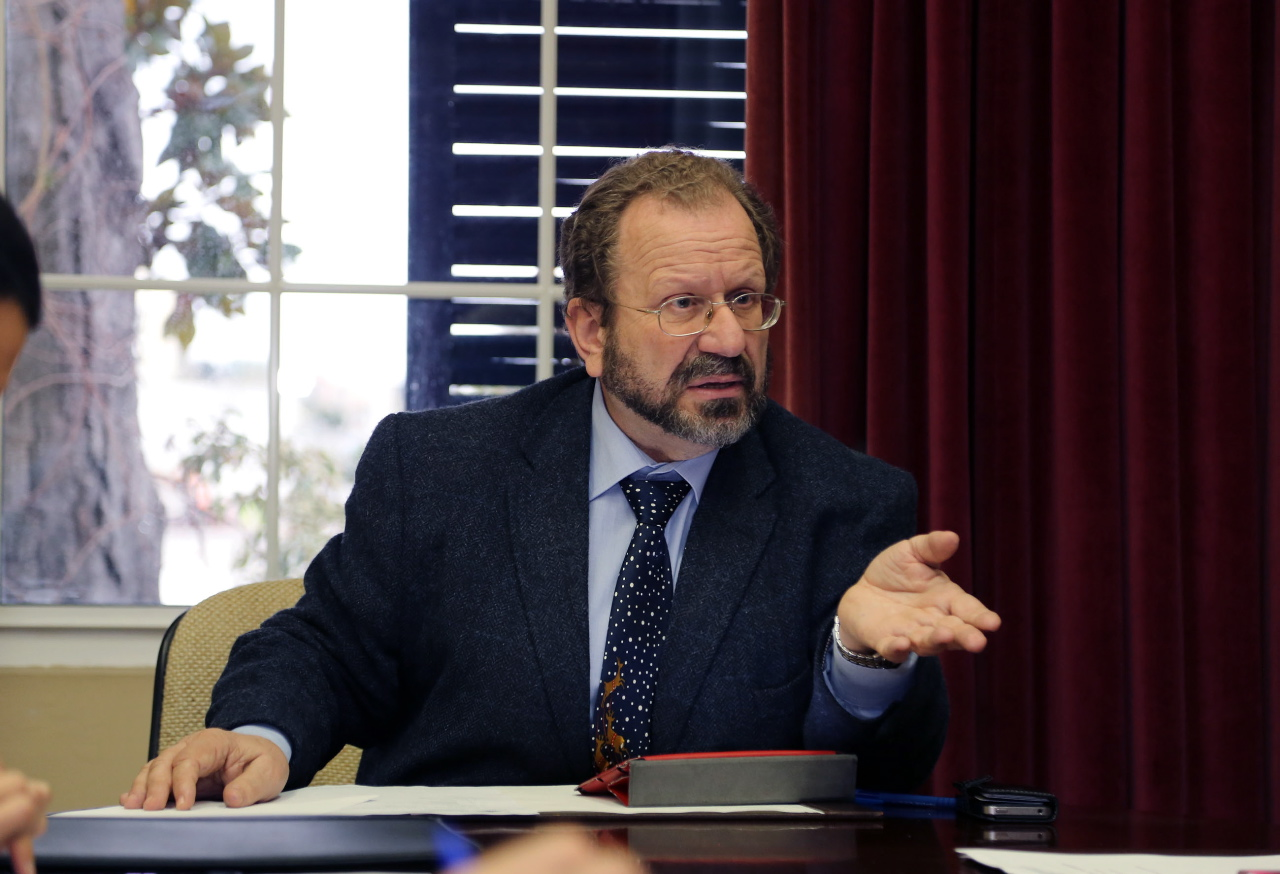
- John Cortes, pictured in 2014

Minister for the Environment, Sustainability, Climate Change and Education
- Incumbent
- Assumed office 2011-present

Personal details
- Born: Gibraltar
- Party: Gibraltar Socialist Labour Party (GSLP)
- Spouse: Valerie
- Children: Zoe and Mark
- Education: University of Oxford
- Occupation: Zoologist; Politician
- Website: John Cortes at the Government of Gibraltar website

John Emmanuel Cortes is an ecologist, zoologist, Justice of the Peace and Gibraltarian MP, member of the Gibraltar Socialist Labour Party. He is married and has two children.

== Biography ==
Cortes founded the Gibraltar Union of Students. In 1976, he became the first General Secretary of the Gibraltar Ornithological & Natural History Society (GONHS), and since 1991, Director of the Gibraltar Botanic Gardens, positions he held until taking government office in 2011.

Between 1983 and 1991, he was also a civil servant, having reached the post of General Manager of the Gibraltar Health Authority.

He was also a Magistrate for 17 years, and was elected President of the Gibraltar Magistrates' Association in 2009.

In December 2011, with his election to the Gibraltar Parliament, Cortes resigned from all his other public duties, and was appointed Minister of Health and Environment by Chief Minister Fabian Picardo.

== Academic life ==
Cortes graduated in Ecology in London, and received his D.Phil. from Oxford University, in 1983.
