= Government of Gibraltar =

Democratically elected government of the British Overseas Territory

His Majesty's Government of Gibraltar
- Central Government
- Country: Gibraltar
- Website: www.gibraltar.gov.gi

The Crown
- Head of state: King Charles III

Legislative
- Legislature: Parliament of Gibraltar

Executive
- Chief Minister: Fabian Picardo
- Headquarters: 6 Convent Place, Gibraltar
- Main organ: Cabinet of Gibraltar

Judicial
- Court: Supreme Court of Gibraltar

His Majesty's Government of Gibraltar is the democratically elected government of the British Overseas Territory of Gibraltar. The head of state is King Charles III who is represented by the Governor. Elections in Gibraltar are held every four years, with a unicameral parliament of 18 members of which 17 members are elected by popular vote and one, the Speaker, appointed by Parliament.

== Executive branch ==
The leader of the majority party (or majority coalition) is formally appointed by the governor as the Chief Minister (head of government).

== Legislative branch ==
The Cabinet (Council of Ministers) is generally formed by 9-10 of the 17 elected Members of Parliament, through choice made by the Chief Minister with the approval of the Governor. The 7-8 remaining members constitute the Opposition (Shadow Cabinet).

The last general election was held on 12 October 2023.

== Salary ==
The Chief Minister earns £142,689 (per anuum) whilst the other Ministers earn £109,253.

== Cabinet ==
The Cabinet (elected as from December 2011) and after the reshuffle, as announced by the Chief Minister after the 2023 general election.

Party	Name	Portfolio
GSLP	Fabian Picardo MP KC	Chief Minister of Gibraltar; Responsibility for the Economy, Public Finance, Financial Stability, Digital Services and IT & Logistics Department; Constituency MP for Upper Town
LPG	Joseph Garcia MP	Deputy Chief Minister of Gibraltar; Constituency MP for Lower Town
GSLP	John Cortes MP MBE	Minister for the Environment, Sustainability, Climate Change and Education; Constituency MP for Alameda Estate and the South District
GSLP	Christian Santos GMD MP	Minister for Equality, Employment, Culture and Tourism; Constituency MP for Varyl Begg Estate, Sir William Jackson Grove and Mid Harbours
GSLP	Nigel Feetham MP	Minister for Justice, Trade and Industry; Constituency MP for Glacis Estate, Laguna Estate, Ocean Village and Bayside
GSLP	Sir Joseph Bossano MP KCMG	Minister for Economic Development, Enterprise, Telecommunications & the Gibraltar Savings Bank; Constituency MP with Special Responsibility for Senior Citizens
LPG	Leslie Bruzon MP	Minister for Industrial Relations, Civil Contingencies and Sports; Constituency MP for the Eastside and Catalan Bay
GSLP	Patricia Orfila MP	Minister for Housing; Constituency MP for Bayview area, Cumberland, Nelson's View, The Anchorage, Rosia Plaza, Rosia Dale and Europa Point
GSLP	Gemma Arias-Vasquez MP KC	Minister for Health, Care and Business; Constituency MP for the Westside Area

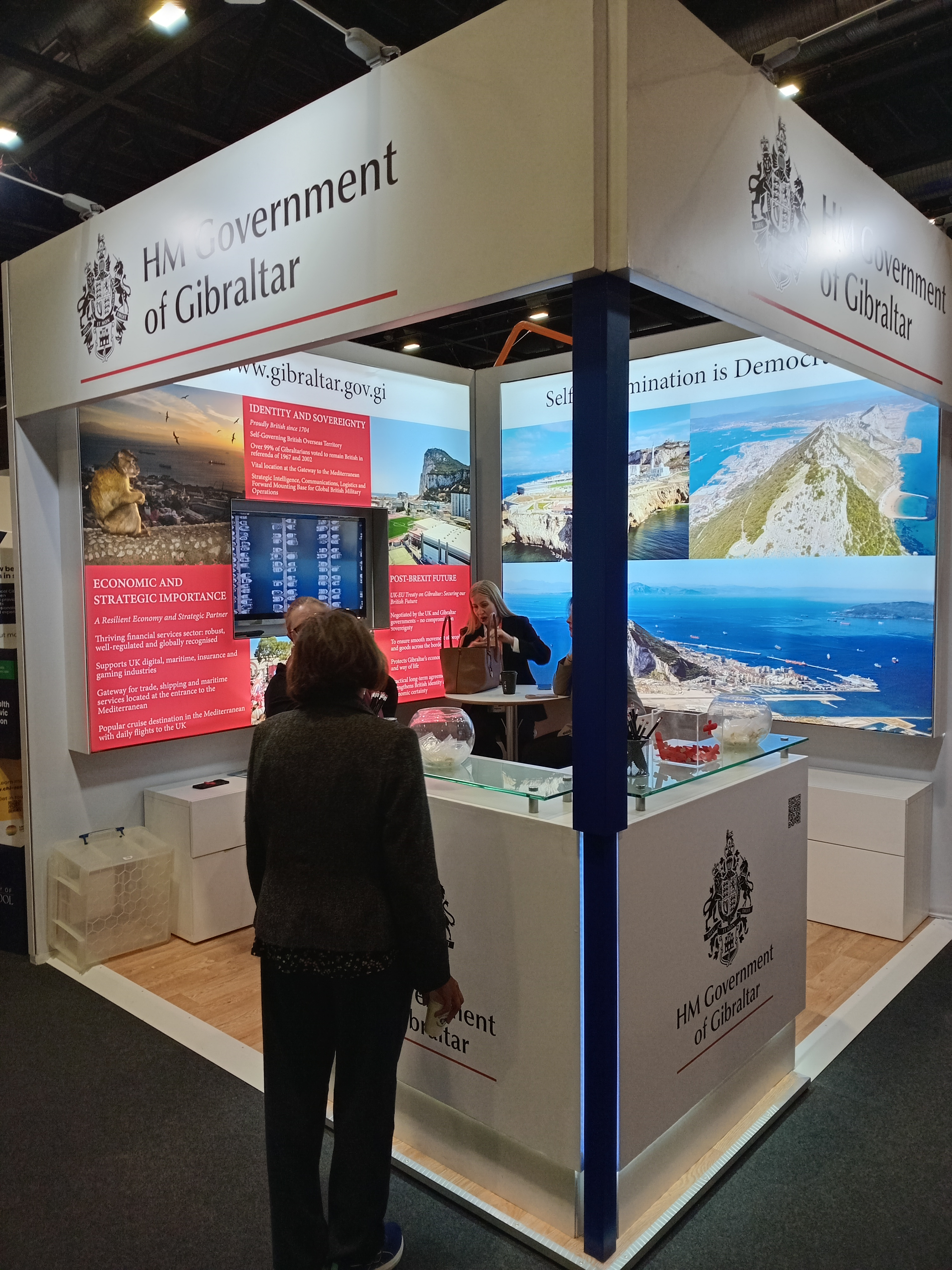
Gibraltar stall at Labour Party Conference 2025

== See also ==
- Gibraltar Parliament
- His Majesty's Most Loyal Opposition (Gibraltar)
- Judiciary of Gibraltar
- Politics of Gibraltar
- Political development in modern Gibraltar
