= Together Gibraltar =

Progressive political party in Gibraltar

- Leader: Nicky Calamaro
- Chairman: Ivan Hernandez
- Founder: Marlene Hassan-Nahon
- Founded: 28 November 2018; 7 years ago
- Split from: Gibraltar Social Democrats
- Youth wing: Together Youth
- Ideology: Progressivism; Social liberalism Pragmatism; Environmentalism; Pro-Europeanism
- Political position: Centre to centre-left
- Colours: Orange and purple
- Gibraltar Parliament: 0 / 17

Website
- www.togethergibraltar.com

Together Gibraltar (TG) is a progressive political party in Gibraltar founded on 28 November 2018.

Together Gibraltar was founded in 2017 as a political organisation by independent MP Marlene Hassan Nahon, formerly of the Gibraltar Social Democrats (GSD). On 17 October 2018 at a general meeting, 86% of the organisation's membership voted for it to become a political party, with the aim of contesting the 2019 Gibraltar general election. On 8 November 2018, Hassan Nahon announced that the party launch was scheduled for 28 November. Nahon retained her seat in the 2019 elections, but no other TG candidates were elected.

In June 2023, Hassan Nahon announced her planned retirement from politics at the following election and resignation as leader party, and that she had ruled out a merger between Together Gibraltar and the GSD party.

In July 2023 it was announced that Together Gibraltar under interim leader Nick Calamaro and the GSD were negotiating a possible electoral pact for the 2023 Gibraltar general election, although later in September 2023 it was revealed that negotiations had failed, with the GSD rejecting an alliance and Together Gibraltar attempting to contest the election alone. On 18 September 2023 it was announced that the party would not contest the 2023 general election, with the organisation aiming to return to campaigning as a pressure group. Calamaro became permanent party leader in December 2023, in an uncontested leadership election.

== Election results ==
=== Parliament of Gibraltar ===
Election	Votes	%	Seats	+/–	Government
2019	32,455	20.50	1 / 17		Minor Opposition
2023	Did not contest		0 / 17	▼1	Extra-parliamentary

== List of Leaders ==
Name	Term in office	Portrait
Marlene Hassan-Nahon	November 2017–June 2023	
Nicky Calamaro (Interim)	June 2023–December 2023	Picture of Nick Calamaro, Together Gibraltar leader in 2023
Nicky Calamaro	December 2023–present	Picture of Nick Calamaro, Together Gibraltar leader in 2023
