= Gemma Arias-Vasquez =

Gibraltarian politician and lawyer

The Honourable Gemma Arias-Vasquez MP

Minister for Health, Care and Business
- Incumbent
- Assumed office 13 October 2023

Member of the Parliament of Gibraltar
- Incumbent
- Assumed office 12 October 2023

Personal details
- Party: Gibraltar Socialist Labour Party
- Spouse: Alfredo
- Children: 2

Gemma Arias-Vasquez is a Gibraltarian politician, currently serving as the Minister for Health, Care and Business. As the only candidate in the upcoming Gibraltar Socialist Labour Party leadership election, she is expected to become the next Chief Minister of Gibraltar, succeeding Fabian Picardo.

== Education and legal career ==
Arias-Vasquez graduated from Oriel College, Oxford, completing her Legal Practice Course at the Oxford Institute of Legal Practice. She worked as a solicitor at Slaughter and May, a British law firm, and was called to the Gibraltar bar in 2007, subsequently becoming a partner at Hassans - a breeding ground for Chief Ministers - where she specialised in construction and corporate law. Arias-Vasquez also served as Chair of the Gibraltar Federation of Small Businesses, and played a leading role in the Remain campaign in Gibraltar during the 2016 United Kingdom European Union membership referendum - a referendum where Gibraltar voted 96% Remain. She was the first in her family to go to university.

== Political career ==
Arias-Vasquez was elected in the 2023 Gibraltar general election, coming 6th of 17 elected, and currently serves as the Minister for Health, Care and Business. Beforehand, she had served on the GSLP's Executive since 2017. In June 2024, Arias-Vasquez became the first Gibraltarian woman to address the United Nations, speaking before the Special Committee on Decolonization. After Fabian Picardo announced his retirement as Chief Minister, Arias-Vasquez became the only declared candidate to succeed him, and is expected to be appointed Chief Minister upon the conclusion of the leadership election.

== Personal life ==
Arias-Vasquez is married to Alfredo and has two sons.
