= Damon Bossino =

Gibraltarian lawyer & politician

The Honourable Damon Bossino MP

HM Opposition Shadow Minister for Housing, Lands & Transport
- Incumbent
- Assumed office December 2011

Personal details
- Born: Damon James Bossino; 14 January 1972 (age 54) Gibraltar
- Party: Gibraltar Social Democrats (GSD) (since 2011)
- Other political affiliations: GNP (1996–2000)
- Spouse: Rosa
- Children: 2
- Education: Kingston University
- Occupation: barrister

Damon James Bossino is a Gibraltarian barrister and Member of the Gibraltar Parliament representing the Gibraltar Social Democrats. He is married to Rosa Arrimadas from Spain with whom he has three children (One of whom has severe mental disability).

== Biography ==
Damon Bossino was educated at Bayside Comprehensive School, where he was a contemporary of Fabian Picardo, the incumbent Chief Minister and leader of the Gibraltar Socialist Labour Party. He studied law in England (Kingston University) and after completing his Bar Professional Training Course at the Inns of Court School of Law, he was admitted to the Bar in 1995 (England and Gibraltar).

Bossino was a candidate in the 1996 general elections by the Gibraltar National Party (GNP), at the age of 24, with many still recalling the concession speech delivered on behalf of the party the morning after the vote. He left what then became the Liberal Party before the 2000 general elections on the ground of its alliance with the GSLP. Prior to the election and up to the time of his resigning from the party he participated in political debates and interviews on TV and radio. He remained out of front line politics until he stood at the last general election but has been a keen follower of the political scene during that time.

In the 2011 general election he was elected as an MP for the Gibraltar Social Democrats and appointed shadow minister for Transport and Tourism. He has had a keen interest in politics since his teens, having participated in school and TV debates on political subjects with Fabian Picardo who was in the same school year, with both making their TV debut debating politics in a programme chaired by Clive Golt in 1991 called ‘Live from the Rock’ which was filmed from the Rock Hotel.

Bossino was appointed Deputy Leader of the GSD on 17 March 2014. He is opposed to the Brussels process and is an advocate of tripartite, open agenda dialogue with Spain, all of which, he has argued, were achieved in the context of the Trilateral Forum of Dialogue secured during the third GSD term. He is firm in his view that the sovereignty of Gibraltar is not a matter for negotiation with Spain.
