= Roy Clinton =

Gibraltarian Former Banker and Politician

The Honourable Roy Clinton MP
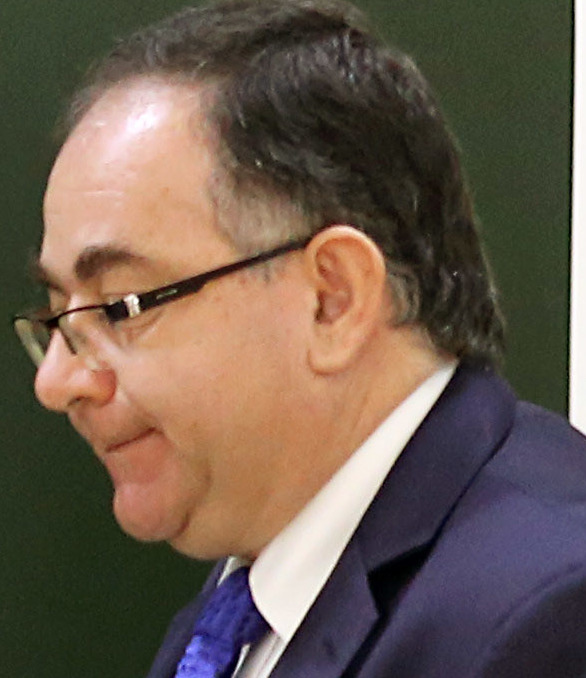

HM Opposition Shadow Minister for Finance & Value for Money
- Incumbent
- Assumed office since 2015

Deputy leader of the Gibraltar Social Democrats

Personal details
- Born: Roy Mark Clinton Gibraltar
- Party: Gibraltar Social Democrats (GSD)
- Education: University of Birmingham
- Occupation: Politician, banker

Roy Mark Clinton is a Gibraltarian politician, former banker and author who is a member and Deputy Leader of the Gibraltar Social Democrats and currently serves as the shadow minister for finance in the Parliament of Gibraltar.

Clinton obtained a bachelor's degree in business studies at the University of Birmingham before working as an auditor for PriceWaterhouseCoopers. He returned to Gibraltar to work in a management position for KPMG and later became chairman of the Gibraltar Bankers’ Association.

He was elected to the Parliament of Gibraltar during the 2015 Gibraltar general election and in 2017 was appointed deputy leader of the GSD. He also currently serves as the shadow minister for finance and has held the position since 2017. From July 2017 to November 2017 he served as acting leader of the party.

Outside of politics, Clinton has a strong interest in local history in Gibraltar and published a book Eliott’s Gold which serves as a semi-fictional account of George Augustus Eliott, 1st Baron Heathfield which takes place in the aftermath of the Great Siege of Gibraltar.

== See also ==
- List of Gibraltarians
- Politics of Gibraltar
