= Gibraltar Parliament =

Legislature of the British overseas territory of Gibraltar

Coordinates: 36.140775°N 5.353758°W

- 14th Gibraltar Parliament

Type
- Type: Unicameral
- Sovereign: Monarch of the United Kingdom
- Established: 1969

Leadership
- Speaker: Karen Ramagge Prescott (non-affiliated) since 10 November 2023
- Leader of The House: Fabian Picardo (Gibraltar Socialist Labour Party) since 9 December 2011
- Leader of The Opposition: Keith Azopardi (Gibraltar Social Democrats) since 19 October 2019

Structure
- Seats: 17
- Political groups: Government (9): GSLP (7); LPG (2); Opposition (8): GSD (8)

Elections
- Voting system: Limited voting
- Last election: 12 October 2023
- Next election: No later than 8 March 2028

Meeting place
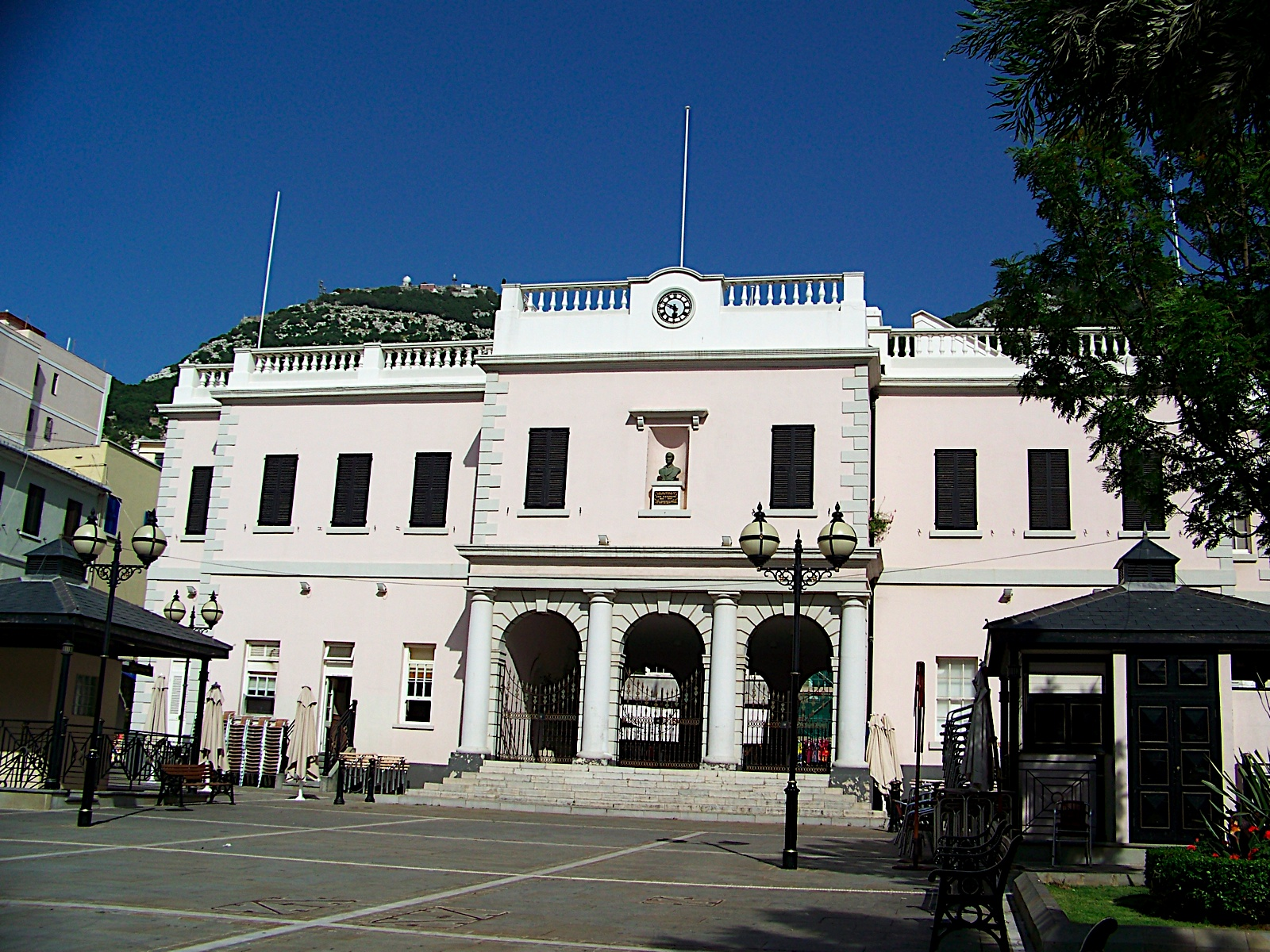
- Parliament building, John Mackintosh Square, Gibraltar

Website
- Parliament.gi

The Gibraltar Parliament is the legislature of the British overseas territory of Gibraltar. Between 1969 and 2006, it was called the Gibraltar House of Assembly.

== Functions ==
The House of Assembly, set up under the 1969 constitution, was a unicameral body originally consisting of 15 members elected by the Gibraltar electorate, plus two appointed members including the attorney-general. The term "House of Assembly" has been commonly used for the legislatures of British territories that are less than fully sovereign. It was replaced by the current Gibraltar Parliament by the new 2006 constitution, reflecting an increase in its sovereignty. All 17 of the new Parliament's members are elected.

Under the election system, each voter was allowed to vote for up to ten members of the Assembly (limited voting). Owing to the small area of Gibraltar and its territorial continuity, precincts served only as polling places, not political units, and there are no electoral districts served by the members, who were instead elected "at large" to serve the territory as a whole.

The system lends itself to block voting – each of the parties or electoral coalitions tended to nominate a slate of ten candidates and encourage its supporters to vote for all of them. In most cases, the winning party or coalition would have all ten of its nominees elected, with the other seven elected members coming from the second-place party.

== Parliament building ==
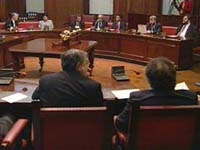
Chamber of the Parliament

The Parliament sits in a building overlooking Main Street and John Mackintosh Square. It was constructed in 1817 and previously served as the Exchange and Commercial Library. In 1951, the building was refurbished to host the Legislative Council. Under the 1969 Constitution, the House of Assembly was established, superseding the Legislative Council. The first session of the House of Assembly was opened on 28 August 1969 by the then governor, Admiral of the Fleet Sir Varyl Begg.

== Current membership ==
The 17 members of the Gibraltar Parliament, as of the 2023 election, are:

Candidate	Party
Fabian Picardo	GSLP
Joseph Garcia	LPG
Joseph Bossano	GSLP
John Cortes	GSLP
Patricia Orfila	GSLP
Christian Santos	GSLP
Gemma Arias-Vasquez	GSLP
Nigel Feetham	GSLP
Leslie Bruzon	LPG
Keith Azopardi	GSD
Edwin Reyes	GSD
Roy Clinton	GSD
Damon Bossino	GSD
Craig Sacarello	GSD
Giovanni Origo	GSD
Atrish Sanchez	GSD
Joelle Ladislaus	GSD

== Latest election ==
Summary of the 12 October 2023 Gibraltar Parliament election results

Party		Votes	%	+/–	Seats	%	+/–	
Alliance	Gibraltar Socialist Labour Party	63,700	35.44	-1.56	7	41.2	±0	
Alliance	Liberal Party of Gibraltar	26,241	14.60	-0.9	2	11.8	-1	
Alliance	Total Alliance	83,122	50.04	-2.46	9	53.0	-1	
Gibraltar Social Democrats		86,537	48.15	+22.6	8	35.3	+2	
Together Gibraltar*		0	0	-20.55	0	0	-1	
Independents		3,262	1.81	+0.36	0	0.0	±0	
Total		179,740	100	-	17	100	-	
Valid votes		18,784	97.55					
Invalid/blank votes		472	2.45					
Total votes cast		19,256	100					
Registered voters/turnout		25,200	76.41					
Source: Parliament of Gibraltar, Gibraltar Parliament General Election, Registered								*Together Gibraltar did not contest 2023 Gibraltar general election.

== See also ==
- Gibraltar Constitution Order 2006
- 2006 Gibraltarian constitutional referendum
- Speaker of the Gibraltar Parliament
