= Timeline of the history of Gibraltar =

Chronology of the history of Gibraltar

This timeline traces the history of Gibraltar from prehistoric times up to the modern era.

Gibraltar has a political and colonial history spanning more than five centuries, with evidence of human habitation dating back at least 20,000 years. During the Middle Ages, it was ruled by a succession of Muslim states before coming under Spanish control and later by the Spaniards. In 1713, Gibraltar was ceded to the United Kingdom, and its ownership has remained a matter of controversy ever since, largely due to its strategic location. Spain continues to claim sovereignty over Gibraltar to this day.

== Prehistoric era ==
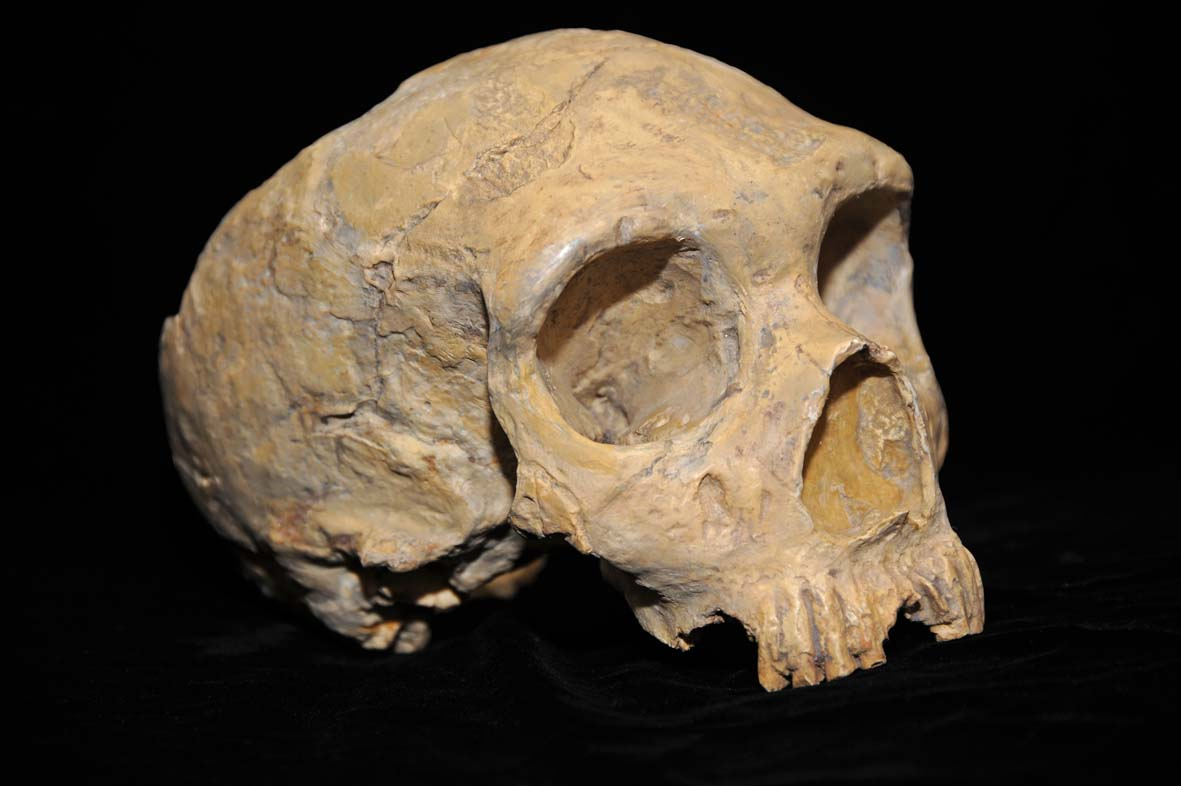
The Gibraltar 1 skull, discovered in 1848 in Forbes' Quarry, was only the second Neanderthal skull and the first adult Neanderthal skull ever found.

Evidence of hominid habitation of Gibraltar dates back to the age of Neanderthals. A 50,000-year-old Neanderthal skull was discovered in Forbes' Quarry in 1848, predating the credited discovery of the species in the Neander Valley in Germany in 1856. In 1926, the skull of a Neanderthal child was found inside the Devil's Tower.

Archaeological evidence of Neanderthal Mousterian Culture deposits found at Gorham's Cave has been dated to between approximately 26,000 and 22,000 BCE. This has led to suggestions that Gibraltar was one of the last places inhabited by the Neanderthals prior to their extinction.

Gibraltar's prehistoric ecology consisted of various species of rare flora and fauna, many of which have since gone extinct. According to biologist Clive Finlayson of the Gibraltar Museum, the "natural richness of wildlife and plants in the nearby sandy plains, woodlands, shrub lands, wetlands, cliffs, and coastline, probably helped the Neanderthals to persist."

Archaeological evidence from Gorham's Cave indicates that the Neanderthals of Gibraltar likely used it as a shelter over a period of ~100,000 years. This discovery challenges conventional assumptions about the timeline of the Neanderthal extinction, traditionally thought to have coincided with the arrival of early modern humans in Western Europe.

== Ancient and Classical Period ==
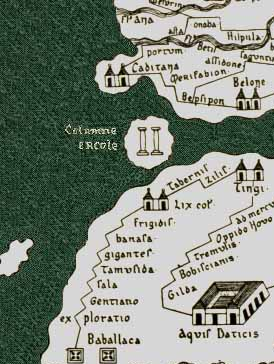
The Pillars of Hercules are depicted erroneously as an island on the Tabula Peutingeriana, an ancient Roman map.

Around 950 BCE, Phoenician-Mediterranean seafarers visited the area surrounding the Rock of Gibraltar, which they called "Calpe". The Carthaginians, themselves descended from the Phoenicians, are also known to have visited the Rock, although neither group appears to have ever established a permanent settlement.

The area now known as Gibraltar was also known to the Greeks. The Athenian philosopher Plato considered Gibraltar one of the Pillars of Hercules, along with Jebel Musa and Monte Hacho on the African side of the Strait of Gibraltar. The Romans visited Gibraltar during the 2nd century, but like earlier seafaring visitors, were either uninterested or unable to establish any kind of permanent settlement.

Following the fall of the Western Roman Empire and Germanic Migration Period, Gibraltar was settled first by the Vandals and later the Visigoths. Although the Visigoths remained, the Vandals did not remain for long. The Visigoths remained in the Iberian Peninsula from 414 CE to 711 CE.

The era of Visigothic rule in Southern Iberia was interrupted by a brief period of Byzantine control following the conquests of Justinian I during the mid 6th century. However, in the early 7th century, the Visigoths successfully reconquered the area and expelled the Byzantines from Iberia.

== Moorish period ==
Due to its location on the shore of the Strait of Gibraltar, the area experienced frequent changes in control during this period. Beginning with Tariq ibn Ziyad’s landing in 711 CE, the Moors would begin a presence in Iberia lasting over seven centuries. During this period, the area known as Al-Andalus (Arabic: الأَنْدَلُس) was the subject of much political intrigue, bitter infighting, and open warfare between competing Moorish factions vying for control, the most notable and powerful being the Almohads, Nasrids, and Marinids. They would later be joined by the Christian kingdom of Castile in the north, which in the late Middle Ages would gradually grow in strength before launching the Reconquista, a prolonged military campaign by Christian kingdoms aimed at gaining control over the Iberian Peninsula and expelling Moorish influence. The following events illustrate Gibraltar's involvement in various regional conflicts over time.

- 30 April 711 – Seeking to conquer Spain, the Muslim Umayyad general, Tariq ibn Ziyad, sails across the Strait from Ceuta, in present-day Morocco, with an army of mainly Muslim Berber soldiers. He initially attempts to land on Algeciras but fails to do so and subsequently withdraws. On his second attempt, again departing from present-day Morocco, Tariq landed at the southern point of the Rock without being reported by local forces. The modern name of Gibraltar originates from the rock's Arab name, Gabal-Al-Tariq ("the Mountain of Tariq"). Little was built during the first four centuries of Moorish control.
- 1160 – The Almohad Sultan Abd al-Mu'min orders the building of a permanent settlement to be protected by a castle. It was called of Medinat al-Fath (English: "City of the Victory"). Upon completion of the town and fortifications, the Sultan crossed the Strait to inspect the works and remained in Gibraltar for two months. The Tower of Homage, part of the original castle fortifications, remains a preserved structure.
- 1231 – After the collapse of the Almohad Empire, Gibraltar is captured by Ibn Hud, Taifa Emir of Murcia.
- 1237 – Following the death of Ibn Hud, Gibraltar changes hands again as his domains are handed over to Muhammad ibn al-Ahmar, the founder of the Nasrid Emirate of Granada.
- 1274 – The second Nasrid king, Muhammed II al-Faqih, cedes Gibraltar to the Marinids as payment for their help in wars against the Christian kingdoms.
- 1309 – While King Ferdinand IV of Castile lays siege to the nearby port of Algeciras, Alonso Pérez de Guzmán (known in the Spanish records as Guzmán el Bueno) is dispatched to capture Gibraltar, resulting in the first siege of Gibraltar. The Castilians manage to seize the Upper Rock and utilized the elevated position to launch attacks on the town. The Moorish garrison surrendered one month later. In the early 14th Century, Gibraltar had a population of approximately 1,500 inhabitants.
- 31 January 1310 – King Ferdinand IV grants Gibraltar its first royal charter. This charter included various incentives to settle in the city, such as the offer of clemency for (some) past crimes to anyone who lived in Gibraltar for one year and one day. This event marked the establishment of the Gibraltar council.
- 1316 – Gibraltar is unsuccessfully put under siege by the Azafid Qaid Yahya ibn Abi Talib, an ally of the Nasrid Emirate of Granada.
- June 1333 – A Marinid army, led by Abd al-Malik, the son of Marinid sultan Abul Hassan, recovers Gibraltar after a five-month siege. King Alfonso XI of Castile immediately attempts to retake Gibraltar with a fleet commanded by Castilian Admiral Alonso Jofre Tenorio. During the ensuing fourth siege, the Marinid defenders dig a ditch across the isthmus. The siege lasts until August, when the Castilians were attacked by a Nasrid relief force from Granada. As a result, the siege ends in a truce, allowing the Marinids to keep Gibraltar.
- March 1344 – Following a two-year siege beginning in 1342, Algeciras is conquered by Castilian forces. Because of this, Gibraltar becomes the main Marinid port in the Iberian Peninsula. During the siege, Gibraltar is used by the Marinids as a base to supply the besieged city.
- 1349 – Gibraltar is again unsuccessfully besieged by King Alfonso XI of Castile.
- 1350 – Alfonso XI once again attempts to put Gibraltar under siege. The siege fails following the arrival the Black Death, which kills Alfonso and eradicates much of the Castilian army.
- 1369 – The Castilian Civil War ends with the murder of King Peter I by the pretender Henry, who takes the regal name Henry II. Afterwards, the Nasrid king of Granada, Muhammad V, a former ally of Peter, attacks and captures over Algeciras following the successful three-day Siege of Algeciras.
- 1374 – Amid internal instability in the Marinid Sultanate of Fez, its Sultan Abu al-Abbas Ahmad al-Mustansir requests assistance from Muhammad V. Either as a condition of the alliance or as reward for Muhammad's successful expedition in Africa, the Marinids cede Gibraltar to the Nasrids of Granada.
- 1379 – The Castilians attack Algeciras. With its capture seemingly imminent, Muhammad V razes the town and renders its harbour unusable. As a result, Gibraltar's significance in the strait trade increases significantly. Subsequently, Muhammad and Henry sign a truce and the Nasrids retain control of Gibraltar.
- 1410 – The garrison in Gibraltar mutinies against the King of Granada and pledges its allegiance to the Marinid King of Fez, Fayd. Fayd sent his brother, Abu Said, across the Strait to Gibraltar to take possession of the city. Fayd also to seizes control of other Nasrid ports such as Marbella and Estepona.
- 1411 – The son of Yusuf III of Granada, Ahmad, recovers Marbella and Estepona from the Marinids and successfully lays siege to Gibraltar, resulting in its reconquest for the Kingdom of Granada.
- 1436 – Enrique de Guzmán, the second Count of Niebla and a landowner with significant holdings in southern Andalusia, launches an assault on Gibraltar. However, his attack is repelled and the Castilian forces incurred significant casualties.

== Castilian and Spanish period ==
- 20 August 1462 – Castilian forces again capture Gibraltar following the eighth siege of Gibraltar. A dispute immediately breaks out between the House of Medina Sidonia (the Guzmán family) and the House of Arcos (the Ponce de León family) over the possession of the town. Juan Alonso de Guzmán, 1st Duke of Medina Sidonia, eventually succeeds and takes possession of the town as his personal property. However, the King of Castile, Henry IV, declares Gibraltar to be crown property, and not the personal property of the Guzman family. Henry IV would restore the charter granted to Gibraltar in 1310 as well as two additional measures: the lands formerly belonging to Algeciras were granted to Gibraltar; and the status of collegiate church was solicited from pope Pius II. The Holy See accepted, granting collegiate status to the local parish church, Saint Mary the Crowned (Spanish: iglesia parroquial de Santa María la Coronada), now the Cathedral of St. Mary the Crowned, located on the site of the old main Moorish Mosque. St. Bernard of Clairvaux was designated as the patron saint of Gibraltar during this period.
- 1463 – In a tour through Andalusia, Henry IV is the first Christian monarch to enter the town of Gibraltar.
- July 1467 – In the midst of a noble revolt against the King, the forces of the Duke of Medina Sidonia take Gibraltar after a 16-month siege. Alfonso of Castile, half-brother of Henry IV and pretender supported by the rebelling nobles, granted him the Lordship of Gibraltar, resulting in the ninth siege of Gibraltar.
- 3 June 1469 – After the death of the pretender Alfonso, the 1st Duke of Medina Sidonia, his son and heir Enrique de Guzman, later 2nd Duke of Medina Sidonia, switches sides to the legitimist faction. Queen Isabella I of Castile rewards them by confirming the status of Gibraltar as a domain of the dukes of Medina Sidonia.
- 20 December 1470 – A new charter is granted to the town of Gibraltar, now a nobiliary town, based on the Antequera charter.
- 30 September 1478 – The crown grants the title of Marquis of Gibraltar to the Duke of Medina Sidonia.
- 20 January 1479 – Ferdinand of Aragon, husband of Isabella I, ascends to the throne of Aragon as Ferdinand II. Known as the Catholic Monarchs, they jointly rule the formerly rival kingdoms of Castile and Aragon.
- 31 March 1492 – Following their conquest of Granada, the Catholic Monarchs sign the Alhambra Decree, ordering the expulsion of the Jews from Spain, to take effect from 31 July 1492. Scores of refugees pass through Gibraltar on their way into exile in North Africa.
- Summer 1492 – After the death of the former Duke, his son and heir, Juan Alfonso Perez de Guzman, 3rd Duke of Medina Sidonia, saw his lordship over Gibraltar reluctantly renewed by the Catholic Monarchs.
- 1497 – From Gibraltar, the Duke of Medina Sidonia launches his conquest of Melilla.
- 2 December 1501 – Acknowledging the importance of the town, the Catholic Monarchs asked the Duke of Medina Sidonia for the return of Gibraltar to the domains of the crown. The Duke accepted the Royal request and ceded the town to the monarchs.
- 1502 2 January – Garcilaso de la Vega took possession of the town on behalf of the Queen Isabella I of Castile.

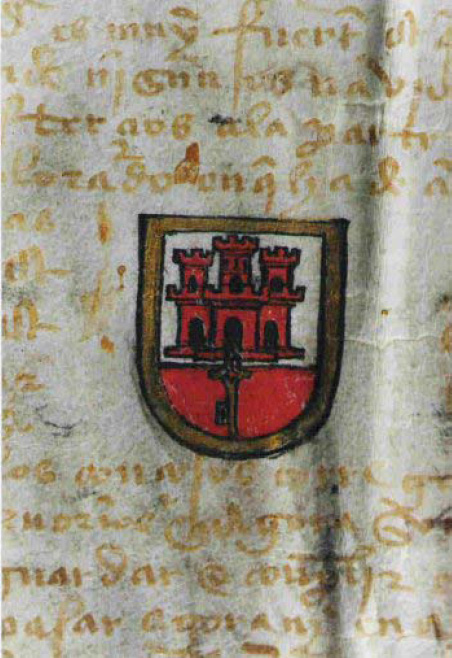
The arms granted to the city of Gibraltar by a Royal Warrant passed in Toledo on 10 July 1502 by Isabella I of Castile

- 1502 10 July – By a Royal Warrant passed in Toledo by Isabella I of Castile, Gibraltar was granted its coat of arms: "An escutcheon on which the upper two thirds shall be a white field and on the said field set a red castle, and below the said castle, on the other third of the escutcheon, which must be a red field in which there must be a white line between the castle and the said red field, there shall be a golden key which hangs by a chain from the said castle, as are here figured". The castle and key motif established in 1502 continues to appear in Gibraltar’s official heraldry.
- 1506 – Alleging a false donation by King Philip I of Castile, the Duke of Medina Sidonia attempted to recover Gibraltar by besieging the town. The siege was unsuccessful, and the Duke was admonished by the Regency and forced to pay a fee to the town. The town received the title of "Most Loyal City" (tenth siege of Gibraltar). The Duke died in 1507.
- 1516 14 March – Spain becomes a united kingdom under Charles I.
- 1540 8 September – Corsairs from the Barbary Coast (ruled by Barbarossa) landed at Gibraltar in sixteen galleys, looting the town and taking away many captives.
- 1552 – After the requests from the inhabitants of the town, Charles I of Spain (the Emperor Charles V) sent the Italian engineer Giovanni Battista Calvi to strengthen the defenses of the town. A wall was built (nowadays known as Charles V Wall); also a ditch by the wall of the town and a drawbridge at the Landport (Puerta de Tierra).

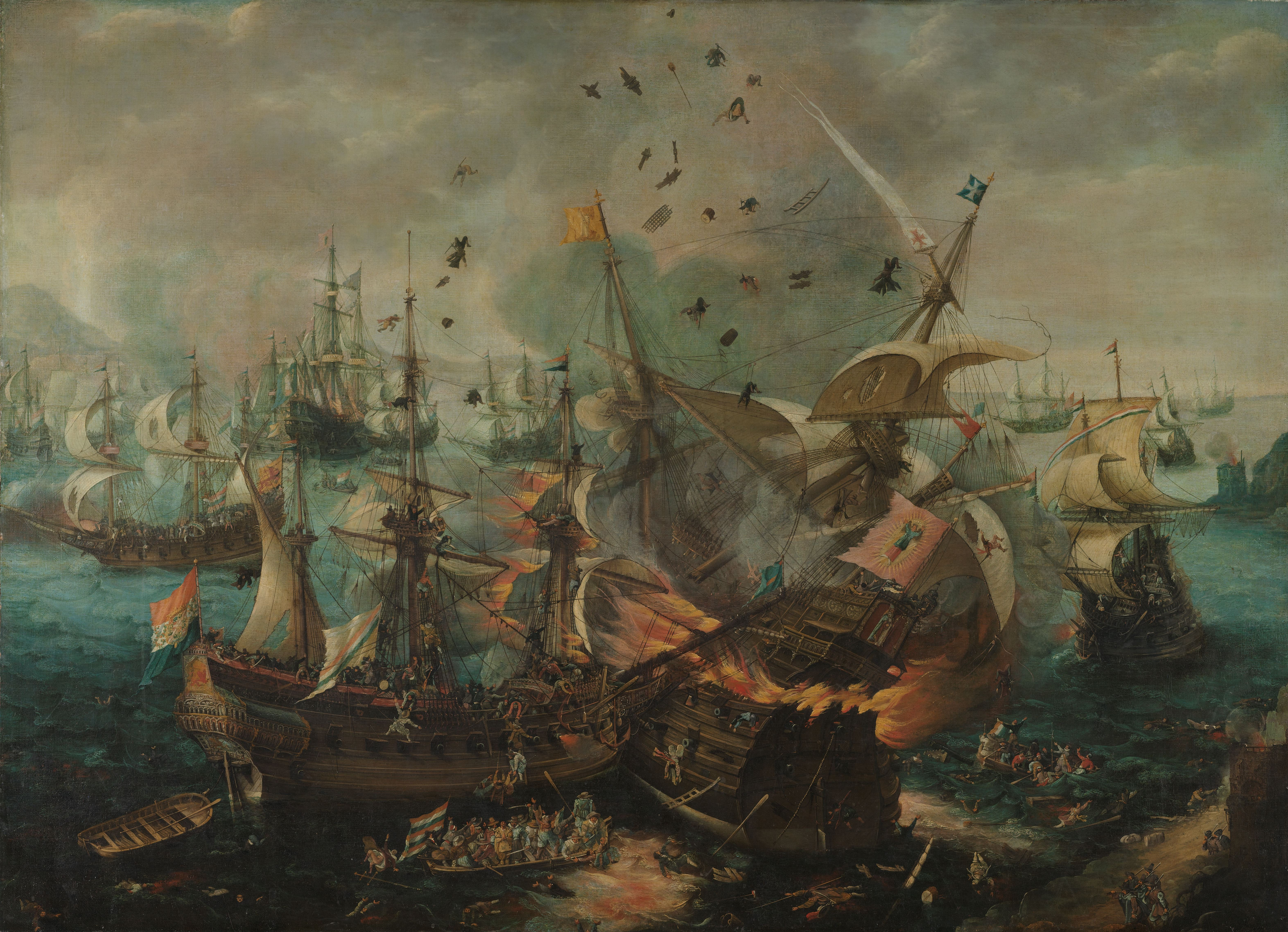
The Battle of Gibraltar, by Hendrick Cornelisz Vroom. Oil on canvas. Rijksmuseum, Amsterdam

- 1567 – Juan Mateos turned his large house in the Upper Town into a hospital. It was Gibraltar's first hospital, and remained on the same site serving the people of Gibraltar for almost four and a half centuries.
- 1606 – The Moriscos (the descendants of the Muslim inhabitants in Spain) were expelled from Spain by King Philip III. Many passed through Gibraltar on their way into exile in North Africa.
- 1607 25 April – During the Eighty Years' War between the United Provinces and the King of Spain, a Dutch fleet surprised and engaged a Spanish fleet anchored at the Bay of Gibraltar (Battle of Gibraltar).
- 1621 – Second battle of Gibraltar, in which a Spanish squadron crushed the VOC at the strait of Gibraltar – Battle of Gibraltar (1621)
- 1649 – Typhoid epidemic in the town.
- 1656 – In a letter to Councillor General Montagu (afterwards Earl of Sandwich), General-at-sea and one of the Protector's personal friends, Cromwell mentioned the necessity of securing a permanent base at the entry of the Mediterranean, preferably Gibraltar (the first suggestion for the occupation of Gibraltar as a naval base had been made at an English Council of War held at sea on 20 October 1625).

== The War of the Spanish Succession ==
- 1700 1 November – King Charles II of Spain died leaving no descendants. In the autumn, he had made a will bequeathing the whole of the Spanish possessions to Prince Philip of Bourbon, a grandson of Louis XIV backed by France. The other pretender, an Austrian Habsburg, Archduke Charles, supported by the Holy Roman Empire, England and the Netherlands did not accept Charles II's testament.
- 1701 September – England, the Netherlands, and Austria signed the Treaty of The Hague. By this treaty, they recognized Philippe of Anjou as King of Spain, but allotted Austria the Spanish territories in Italy and the Spanish Netherlands. England and the Netherlands, meanwhile, were to retain their commercial rights in Spain. Later (in 1703), Portugal, Savoy and some German states joined the alliance.
- 1702 May – Formal beginning of the War of the Spanish Succession.
- 1703 12 February – Archduke Charles was proclaimed King of Castile and Aragon in Vienna. He took the name of Charles III.

=== The Gibraltar capture ===
(A discrepancy exists between Spanish and British sources due to differences in calendar systems. England was still using the Julian calendar in 1704, which lagged 11 days behind the Gregorian calendar used by Spain. Thus, the siege began on 21 July in the Julian calendar (1 August in the Gregorian).

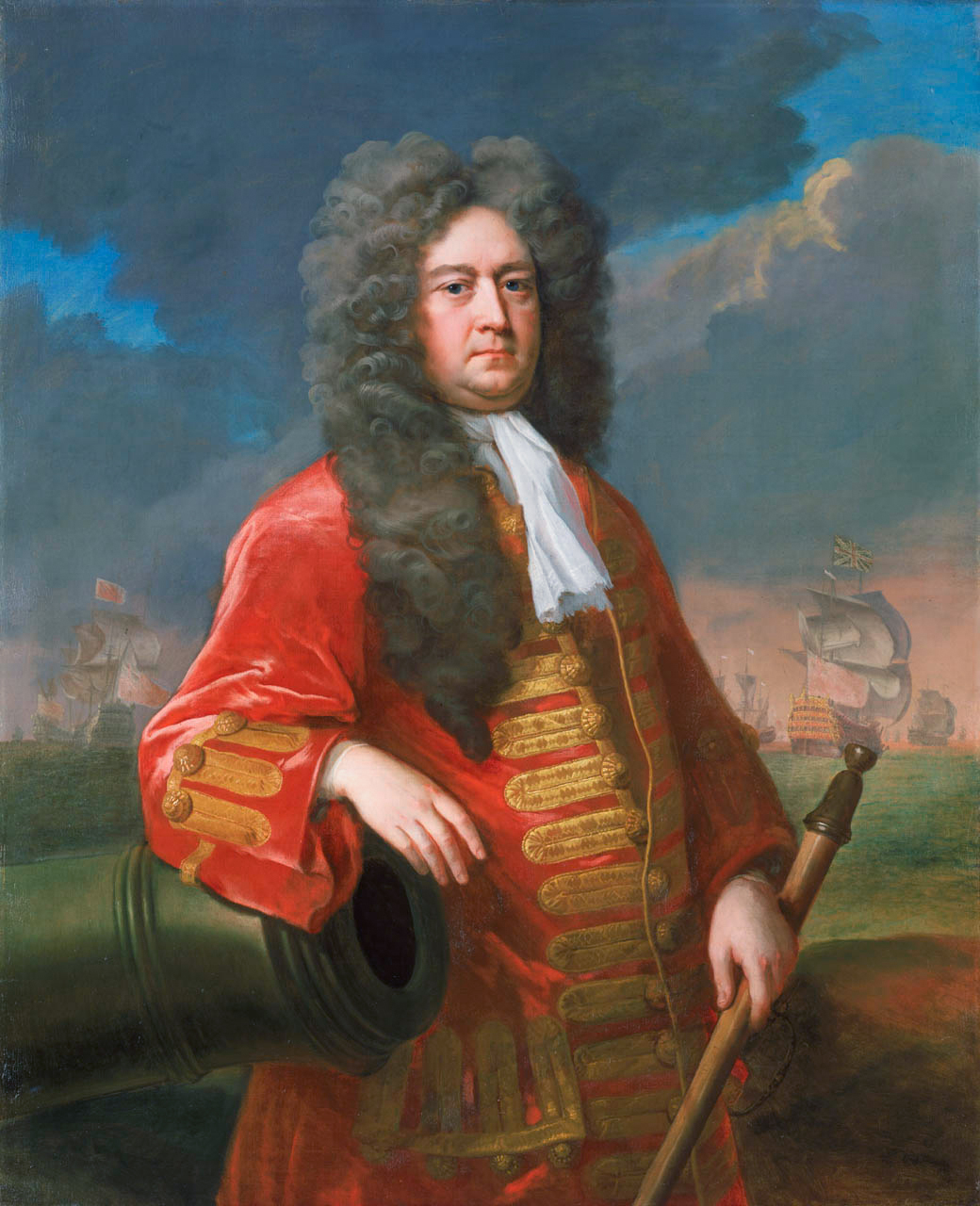
George Rooke, the commander of the Anglo-Dutch fleet that conquered Gibraltar on behalf of the Archduke Charles

- 1704 1 August(NS): (21 July(OS)) – During the War of the Spanish Succession, and when returning from a failed expedition to Barcelona, an Anglo-Dutch fleet, under the command of Sir George Rooke, chief commander of the Alliance Navy, began a new siege (the eleventh siege of the town). They demanded its unconditional surrender and an oath of loyalty to the Habsburg pretender to the Spanish throne, the Archduke Charles. The Governor of Gibraltar, Diego de Salinas, refused. A force of 1,800 Dutch Royal Marines and British Royal Marines, led by Prince George of Hesse-Darmstadt, the Alliance Army commander in Spain, began the siege of Gibraltar in the name of Archduke Charles. A small contingent of Spaniards, primarily Catalans, joined the Prince’s forces.
- 1704 3–4 August – Heavy shelling targeted the castle and the town overnight.
- 1704 4 August – Governor Diego de Salinas surrendered the town to Prince George of Hesse, who took it in the name of Archduke, as Charles III, King of Castile and Aragon. This was the end of the eleventh siege of Gibraltar (a map on the situation of attacking forces can be seen in)

The exact beginning of British control over Gibraltar is hard to determine. From the eighteenth century, Spanish sources reported that immediately after the takeover of the city, Sir George Rooke, the British admiral, on his own initiative, caused the British flag to be hoisted, and took possession of the Rock in the name of Anne, Queen of Great Britain, whose government ratified the occupation. On the other hand, even the British or the Gibraltarians sometimes date the beginning of British sovereignty in 1704 (for instance, in his speech at the United Nations in 1994, the Gibraltar Chief Minister Joe Bossano, stated that Gibraltar has been a British colony ever since it was taken by Britain in 1704). Also, some British sources have accounted the flag story (He [Rooke] had the Spanish flag hauled down and the English flag hoisted in its stead; Rooke's men quickly raised the British flag ... and Rooke claimed the Rock in the name of Queen Anne; or Sir George Rooke, the British admiral, on his own responsibility caused the British flag to be hoisted, and took possession in name of Queen Anne, whose government ratified the occupation).

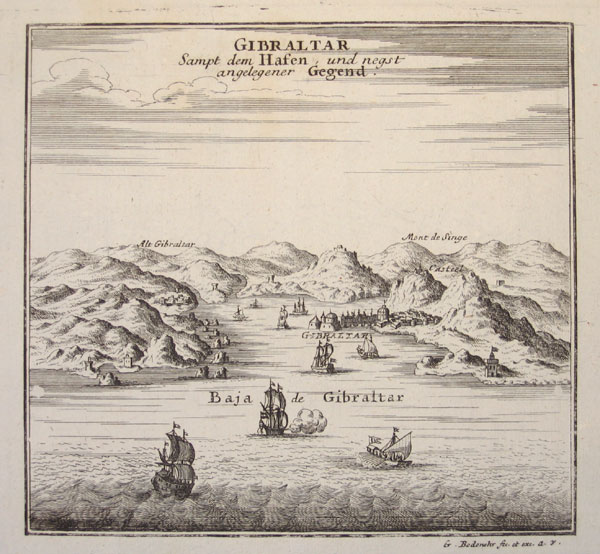
Gibraltar antique engraving by Gabriel Bodenehr, c.1704. From his rare "Curioses Staats- und Kriegs-Theatrum".

Modern Spanish and British historians agree this version is apocryphal, as it is uncorroborated by contemporary sources. Isidro Sepúlveda, William Jackson and George Hills explicitly refute it. Sepúlveda notes that it would have caused a major crisis in the Alliance supporting Archduke Charles. Hills argues the story was first accounted by the Marquis of San Felipe in his 1725 book Comentarios de la guerra de España e historia de su rey Felipe V el animoso more than twenty years later and that the marquis was not an eyewitness. Hills concludes: "The flag myth ... may perhaps be allowed now to disappear from Anglo-Spanish polemics. On the one side it has been used to support a claim to the Rock 'by right of conquest'; on the other to ... pour on Britain obloquy for perfidy").
What does seem nowadays to be proved is that the British troops who had landed on the South Mole area raised their flag to signal their presence to the ships and avoid being fired upon by their own side. Regardless of the exact events, Gibraltar officially passed out of the rule of Philip V of Spain in 1704. In 2004, a statue of Sir George Rooke was unveiled to mark the 300th anniversary of this historic event.

- 1704 4–7 August. Although the Grand Alliance initially ordered respect for civilians to win local support, discipline quickly broke down, as it had during the 1702 raid on Cádiz. This led to widespread chaos: numerous reports of sexual violence, the desecration or conversion of all but one Catholic church (St. Mary the Crowned, now the Cathedral) into military storehouses, and the destruction of religious symbols like the statue of Our Lady of Europe. Angry Spanish inhabitants retaliated. English and Dutch soldiers and sailors were attacked and killed, their bodies were thrown into wells and cesspits. After order was restored, despite the surrender agreement promising property and religious rights, most of the population left with the garrison on 7 August, citing loyalty to Philip. Several factors influenced the decision including the expectation of a counterattack and the violence during the capture, which ultimately proved disastrous for the Habsburg cause. The subsequent siege failed to dislodge the Habsburg forces and the refugees settled around Algeciras and the hermitage of San Roque. The Alliance's conduct aroused anger in Spain against the 'heretics', and once again the chance of winning over Andalusians to the Imperial cause was lost. Prince George was the first to complain, which was resented by Byng who had led the fighting and who in turn blamed the Prince and his few Spanish or Catalan supporters. Rooke complained in a letter home that the Spaniards were so exasperated against the Alliance that 'they use the prisoners they take as barbarously as the Moors'. Spain attempted to retake Gibraltar in 1727 and most notably in 1779, when it entered the American Revolutionary War on the American side as an ally of France.
- 1704 7 August. A dejected procession, numbering some 4,000 according to most sources, such as Hills or Jackson, filed out of the Land Port with Queen Isabella's banner at their head. They were led by the Spanish Governor, Diego de Salinas, the Spanish garrison, with their three brass cannon, the religious orders, the city council, and all those inhabitants who did not wish to take the oath of allegiance to Charles III, as asked by the terms of surrender. They took with them the symbols and objects of Spanish Gibraltar's history: the council and ecclesiastical records, including the historical documents signed by the Spanish Catholic Monarchs in 1502, granting Gibraltar's coat of arms, and the statue of the Saint Mary the Crowned. Most of them took refuge in the proximity of the nearby Chapel of San Roque, possibly hoping for a rapid reconquest of Gibraltar, which never materialized. There, a new settlement was formed, being granted a council two years later (1706), with the name of San Roque, and being considered by the Spanish Crown as the heir to the lost town of Gibraltar (historical objects and records predating 1704 were subsequently taken to San Roque where they remain to this day.) King Philip V of Spain dubbed San Roque as "My city of Gibraltar resident in its Campo". Others settled down in what today is Los Barrios or even further away, in the ruins of the abandoned city of Algeciras. Only about seventy people remained in the town, most of them religious, people without family, or belonging to the Genoese trader colony (see list in).
- 1704 24 August – The Alliance fleet, under the command of Rooke, set sail from Gibraltar, and intercepted a joint Spanish-French fleet that attempted to recover Gibraltar by the coast of Málaga (Battle of Vélez-Málaga). The result was uncertain, with heavy losses on both sides, but the Spanish-French fleet was stopped and prevented from arriving at Gibraltar.

=== The first Spanish siege (twelfth siege of Gibraltar) ===
- 1704 5 September – Troops of France and Spain under the marquis of Villadarias, General Captain of Andalusia, started to besiege Gibraltar to try to recover it (known as the twelfth siege of Gibraltar). In the town, the Marine brigade, still under the command of the British admiral Sir John Leake, and the governor, Prince George of Hesse-Darmstadt (who had commanded the land forces in August), and reinforced shortly before by a further 400 Royal Marines, held the fortress against repeated attacks.
- 1704 11 November – A notable incident during the siege: 500 Spanish volunteer grenadiers tried to surprise the garrison after being led up a concealed path to the top of The Rock by a Spanish goatherd from Gibraltar, Simón Susarte. Captain Fisher of the Marines, with 17 of his men, successfully defended the Round Tower against their assault. A contemporary report of this noted defence says, "Encouraged by the Prince of Hesse, the garrison did more than could humanly be expected, and the English Marines gained an immortal glory".
- 1705 January – Philip V replaced Villadarias with the Marshal of France de Tessé.
- 1705 7 February – The last assault before the arrival of de Tessé was executed. The Gibraltar wall was damaged, but French troops refused to go on until the arrival of de Tessé (who arrived the day after). The assault becomes unsuccessful.
- 1705 31 March – The Count de Tessé gave up the siege and retired.

=== During the rest of the war ===
Although nominally in the hands of the Archduke Charles, and garrisoned with both English and Dutch regiments, Britain began to monopolize the rule of the town. Even if the formal transfer of sovereignty would not take place until the signature of the Treaty of Utrecht, the British Governor and garrison become the de facto rulers of the town.

- 1705 2 August – The Archduke Charles stopped over in Gibraltar on his way to the territories of the Crown of Aragon. The Prince of Hesse joined him, thus leaving the town (he would die one month later in the siege of Barcelona). The English Major General, John Shrimpton, was left as governor (appointed by the Archduke Charles on the recommendation of Queen Anne).
- 1706 17 February – Queen Anne though not yet the legal ruler of the territory, declared Gibraltar a free port (upon request of the Sultan of Morocco, who wanted Gibraltar being given this status in return for supplying the town).
- 1707 24 December – The first British Governor directly appointed by Queen Anne, Roger Elliott, took up residence in the Convent of the Franciscan friars.
- 1711 – The British government, then in the hands of the Tories, covertly ordered the British Gibraltar governor, Thomas Stanwix, to expel any foreign troops in order to foster Great Britain's sole right to Gibraltar in the negotiations running up between Britain and France. Although he answered positively, he allowed a Dutch regiment to stay. It remained there until March 1713.^{[17]}

== British rule ==
=== Treaty of Utrecht ===
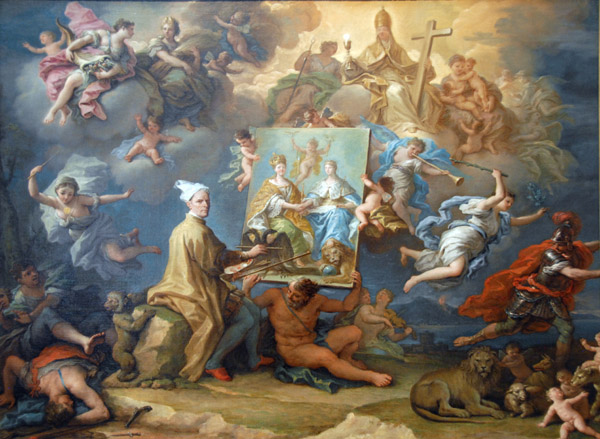
Allegory of the Peace of 1714

- 1713 11 April – The territory was subsequently ceded to the Crown of Great Britain in perpetuity by Spain under article X of the Treaties of Utrecht. Despite some military attempts by the Spanish to retake it in the 18th century, most notably in the Great Siege of 1779–1783, the Rock has remained under British control ever since.

In that treaty, Spain ceded Great Britain "the full and entire propriety of the town and castle of Gibraltar, together with the port, fortifications, and forts thereunto belonging ... for ever, without any exception or impediment whatsoever."
The Treaty stipulated that no overland trade between Gibraltar and Spain was to take place, except for emergency provisions in the case that Gibraltar is unable to be supplied by sea. Another condition of the cession was that, "no leave shall be given under any pretence whatsoever, either to Jews or Moors, to reside or have their dwellings in the said town of Gibraltar." This was not respected for long, and Gibraltar has had for many years an established Jewish community, along with Muslims from North Africa.
Finally, under the Treaty, should the British crown wish to dispose of Gibraltar, Spain should be offered the territory first.

=== Until the Peninsular Wars ===
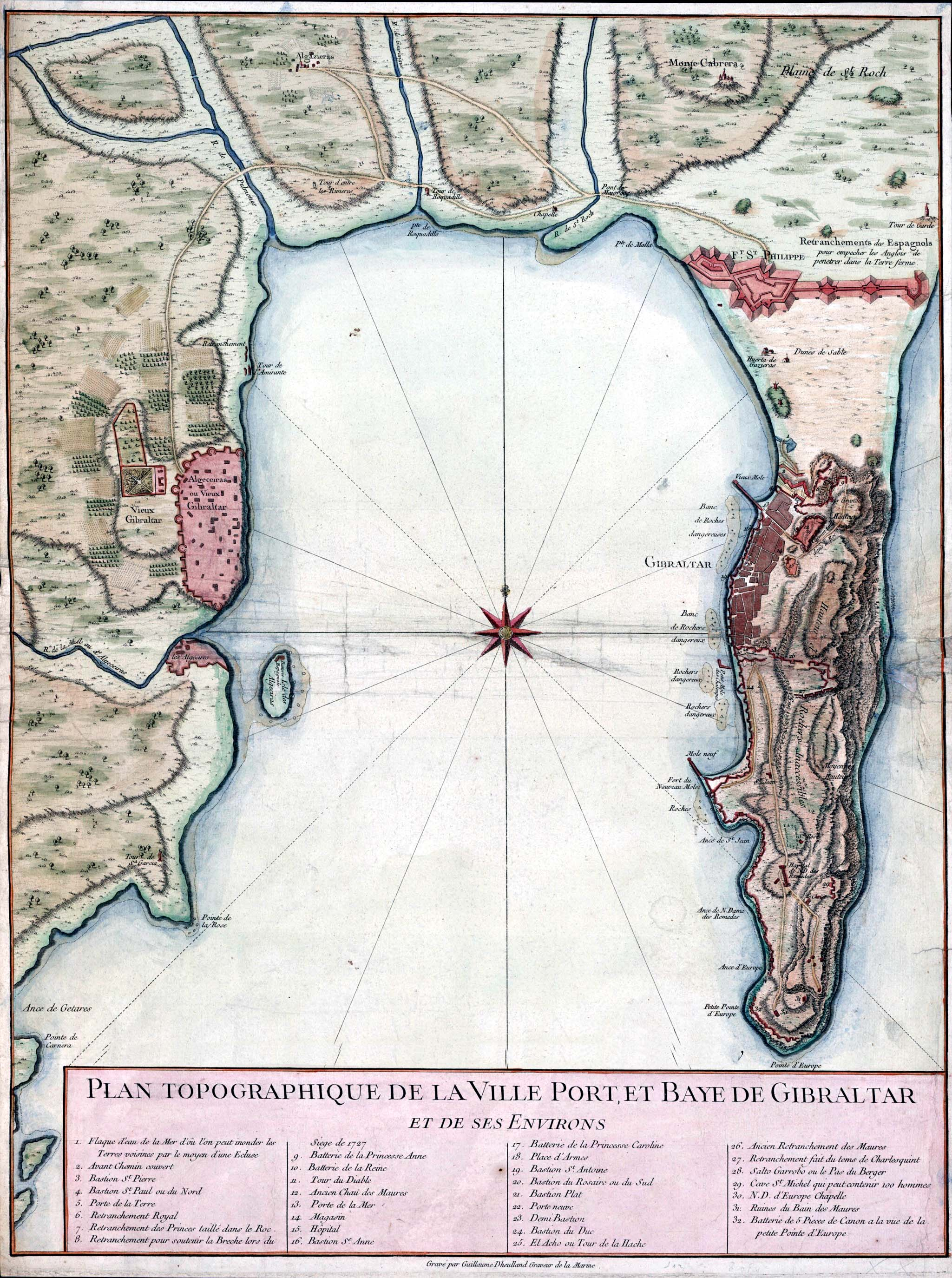
c. 1750 map of Algeciras Bay showing Algeciras (left) and Gibraltar

Between 1713 and 1728, there were seven occasions when British ministers were prepared to bargain Gibraltar away as part of their foreign policy. However, the Parliament always frustrated such attempts, echoing public opinion in Britain.

- 1721 March – Philip V of Spain requested the restitution of Gibraltar to proceed with the renewal of the trade licences of Great Britain with the Spanish possessions in America.
- 1721 1 June – George I sent a letter to Philip V promising "to make use of the first favourable Opportunity to regulate this Article (the Demand touching the Restitution of Gibraltar), with the Consent of my Parliament". However, the British Parliament never endorsed such promise.
- 1727 February–June – The second siege by Spain attempting to recapture Gibraltar (the thirteenth siege of Gibraltar). Depending on the sources, Spanish troops were described to be ranging from 12,000 and 25,000. British defenders were 1,500 at the beginning of the siege, increasing up to about 5,000. After a five-month siege, with several unsuccessful and costly attempts, Spanish troops gave up and retired.
- 1729 At the end of the Anglo-Spanish War of 1727–1729, the Treaty of Seville confirmed all previous treaties (including the Treaty of Utrecht), allowing Great Britain to keep Menorca and Gibraltar.
- 1730 A Belgian Engineer, the Marquis of Verboom, Chief Engineer of the Spanish Royal Engineer Corps, who had taken part in the 1727 siege, arrived in San Roque commissioned by the Spanish government to design a line of fortifications across the isthmus. Fort San Felipe and Fort Santa Barbara were built. The fortifications, known to the British as the Spanish Lines, and to Spain as La Línea de Contravalación were the origin of the modern-day town of La Línea de la Concepción.
- 1749–1754 – Lieutenant General Humphrey Bland is the Governor of Gibraltar. He compiles the twelve "Articles" or regulations that ruled the administration of Gibraltar for over sixty years. The first article established that only Protestants may own property. In 1754, the population settled at around 6,000 people, with the garrison and their dependents constituting about three-quarters of it. The civilian population was mainly Genoese or Jewish.
- 1776 23 February – One of the heaviest storms ever recorded in Gibraltar. The lower part of the town was flooded. The Line Wall was breached along 100 meters.
- 1779 June – In the midst of the American Revolutionary War, Spain declared war against Great Britain (as France had done the year before).

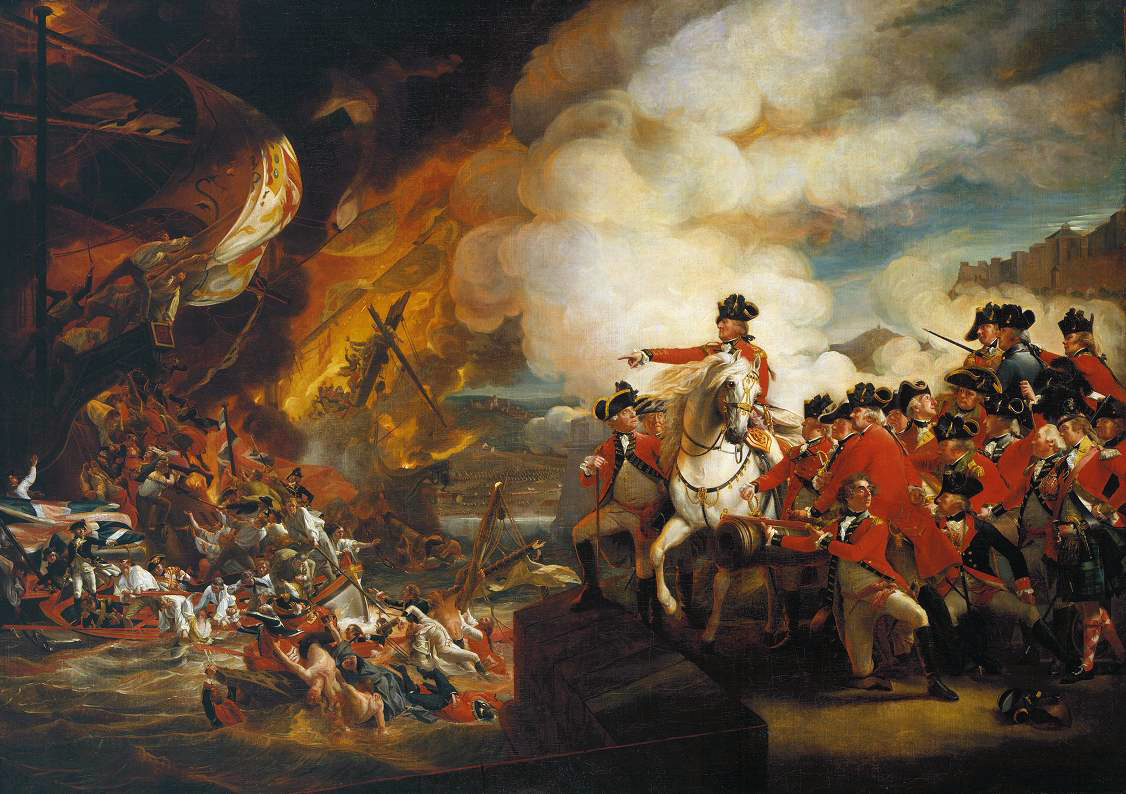
The Defeat of the Floating Batteries at Gibraltar, 13 September 1782. By John Singleton Copley (1738–1815)

- 1779 July Start of the Great Siege of Gibraltar (fourteenth and most recent military siege). This was an action by French and Spanish forces to gain control of Gibraltar from the established British Garrison. The garrison, led by George Augustus Eliott, who later became 1st Baron Heathfield of Gibraltar, survived all attacks and a blockade of supplies.
- 1782 13 September – Start of an assault involving 100,000 men, 48 ships, and 450 cannon. The British garrison survived.
- 1782 Work on the Great Siege Tunnels started. The tunnels became a great and complex system of underground fortifications which nowadays criss-crosses the inside of the Rock. Once the Siege was over, the fortifications were rebuilt and, in the following century, the walls were lined with Portland limestone. Such stone gave the walls their present white appearance. The successful resistance in the Great Siege is attributed to several factors: the improvement in fortifications by Colonel (later General Sir) William Green in 1769; the British naval supremacy; the competent command by General George Augustus Elliot; and an appropriately sized garrison. As in the early years of the British period, during the Siege, the British Government considered exchanging Gibraltar for some Spanish possession. However, by the end of the Siege "the fortress and its heroic response to the siege was now acquiring a sort of cult status amongst the population in Britain and no exchange however attractive, was likely to be acceptable".
- 1783 February – By that time, the siege was over, and George Augustus Eliott was awarded the Knight of the Bath, and was made 1st Baron Heathfield of Gibraltar. The Treaties of Versailles which ceded Menorca and Florida to Spain, reaffirmed previous treaties, thus leaving Gibraltar unaffected.
- 1800 – Malta is taken over by Great Britain. The possession of Malta (confirmed by the Treaty of Paris) in 1814 increased the attractiveness of Gibraltar, since controlling both Gibraltar and Malta meant the effective mastery of the Mediterranean Sea by the Royal Navy.
- 1802 – Several mutinies among some regiments garrisoned in Gibraltar.
- 1802 – The first merchant token to bear the name Gibraltar (albeit spelt Gibralter) was issued by Robert Keeling to alleviate a shortage of copper.
- 1803 June – Admiral Nelson arrived in Gibraltar as Commander-in-Chief Mediterranean.
- 1804 – Great epidemic of "Malignant Fever" broke out. Traditionally labelled as "Yellow Fever", it is now thought to have been typhus. Nearly 5,000 people died.
- 1805 January – The great epidemic ended. Over a third of the civilian population (5,946 people) died.
- 1805 21 October – Battle of Trafalgar.
- 1805 28 October – HMS Victory was towed into Gibraltar, bringing Nelson's body aboard. The Trafalgar Cemetery still exists today in Gibraltar.
- 1806 – Gibraltar was made a Catholic Apostolic Vicariate (until then Gibraltar belonged to the See of Cádiz). Since 1840, the vicar has always been the Bishop of Gibraltar.
- 1810 – Britain and Spain became allies against Napoleon.
- 1810 February – The Governor of Gibraltar removed the Spanish forts of San Felipe and Santa Barbara, located on the northern boundary of the neutral ground. Fearing the forts might fall into French hands, Lieutenant General Sir Colin Campbell instructed Royal Engineers to blow the forts up. Such a task was carried out on 14 February, together with the demolition of the rest of the fortifications of the Spanish Lines.

(According to George Hills, no primary sources attest to the demolition being requested or authorized by any Spanish or British authority. According to him, over time, three different theories have emerged: (a) Campbell ordered the demolition on his own authority (b) under instructions from the British Government (c) upon the request of Spanish General Castaños, who was at the time in Cádiz. Spanish authors from 1840 have usually favoured theory (b), while British ones have supported (c). Hills considers (a) to be the most probable.

- During the Peninsular War, contingents from the Gibraltar Garrison were sent to aid Spanish resistance to the French at Cádiz and Tarifa. As William Jackson describes, "Gradually Gibraltar changed from being the objective of the San Roque garrison into the supply base and refuge in time of trouble for the Spanish forces operating in Southern Andalusia".

=== Until the Second World War ===
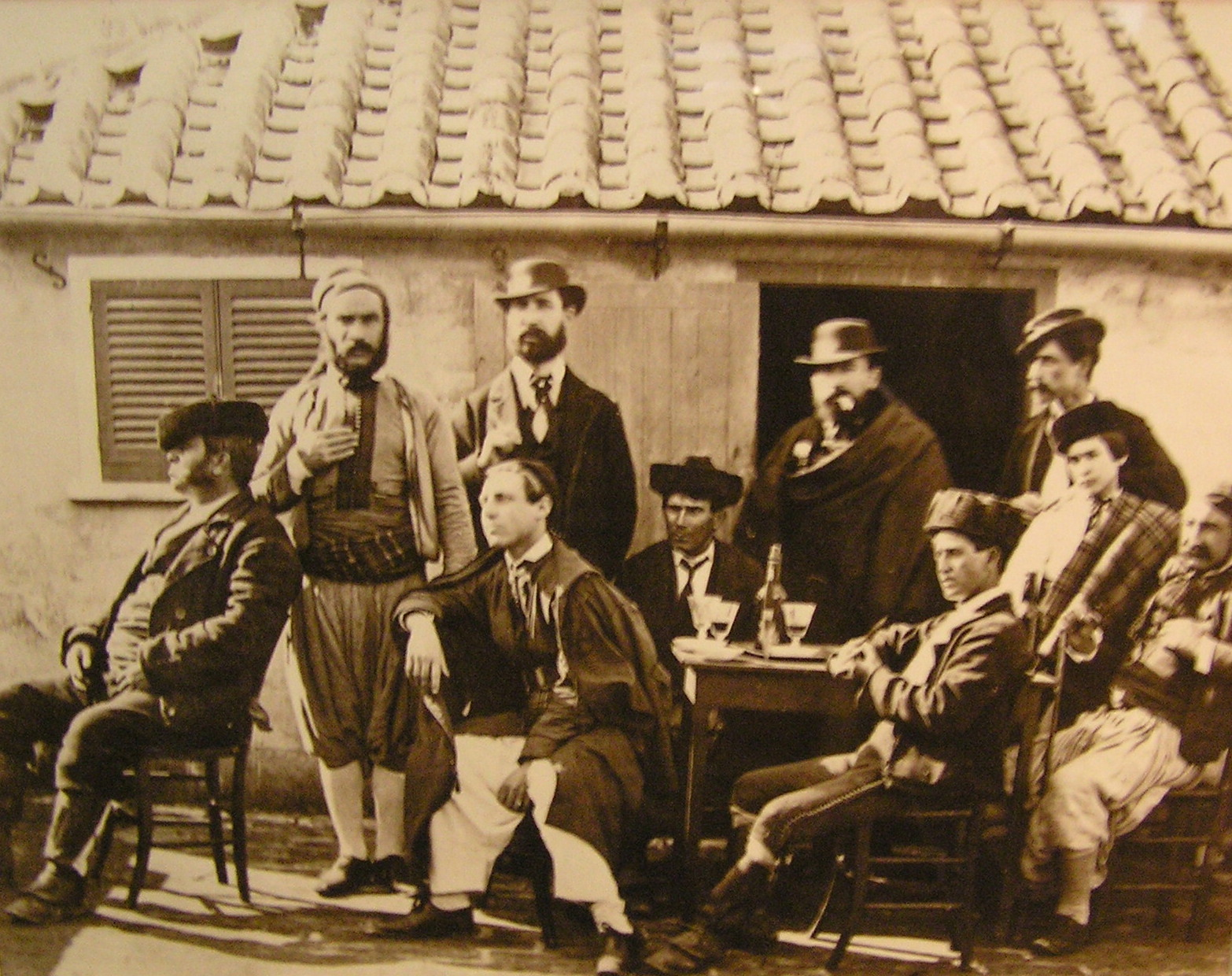
Characters of Gibraltar (R.P. Napper, 1863; private collection)

- 1814 – Outbreak of malignant fever.
- 1815 – The civilian population of Gibraltar was about 10,000 people (two and a half times the size of the garrison). The Genoese constituted about one-third of the civilian population (a large number of immigrants had arrived from Genoa at the beginning of the century). The rest were mainly Spaniards and Portuguese people who fled from the war, and Jewish people from Morocco.
- 1817 – The first civil judge was established.
- 1830 – The British government changes the status of Gibraltar from "The town and garrison of Gibraltar" to the "Crown Colony of Gibraltar". Thus, the responsibility for its administration is transferred from the War Office to the new Colonial Office.

Legal institutions and the Gibraltar Police Force were established.
1832 – The Church of the Holy Trinity, built for the needs of Anglican worshipers among Gibraltar's civil population, is completed. (Ten years later, it became the Cathedral of the Holy Trinity).
1842 21 August – The Church of England Diocese of Gibraltar was founded by Letters Patent, taking over the pastoral care of the chaplaincies and congregations from Portugal to the Caspian Sea. George Tomlinson is enthroned as the first Bishop of Gibraltar. The Church of the Holy Trinity, Gibraltar becomes the Cathedral for the Diocese.

- 1842 – Official Coins of the Realm were issued for Gibraltar by the Royal Mint. Coins were issued in ½, 1 and 2 Quart denominations.
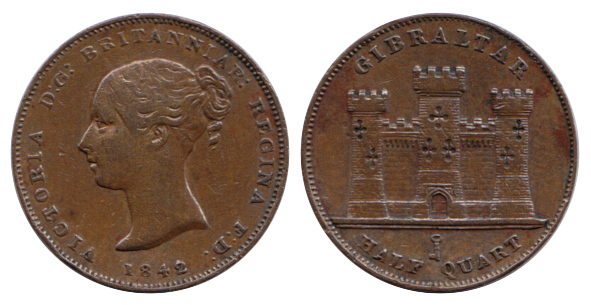
  1842 Half Quart coin issue by the Royal Mint
- 1869 – The Suez Canal was opened. It heavily increased the strategic value of the Rock in the route from the United Kingdom to India. The Gibraltarian economy, mainly based on commercial shipping and import-export trade, took on a new income source with the opening of a coaling station for the new steam ships.
- 1891 17 March – America-bound steamer Utopia slammed into the iron-plated British battleship HMS Anson (due to heavy weather) and sank in the Bay of Gibraltar; 576 people died.
- 1894 – The construction of the dockyards started.
- 1908 5 August – The British Ambassador in Madrid informed the Spanish Minister of State, 'as an act of courtesy', of the British Government's intention to build a fence along the line of British sentries on the isthmus to prevent smuggling and reduce sentry duty. According to the British government, the fence was erected 1 metre inside British territory. Spain currently does not recognize the fence as the valid border, since it claims the fence was built on Spanish soil.
- 1921 – Gibraltar was granted a City Council status in recognition for its contribution to the British war efforts in World War I. The council had a small minority of elected persons. First elections held in Gibraltar.
- 1936–1939 – After the United Kingdom recognized the Franco's regime in 1938, Gibraltar had two Spanish Consulates, a Republican one, and a Nationalistic one. Several incidents took place during the Spanish Civil War which affected Gibraltar. In May 1937, HMS Arethusa had to tow HMS Hunter into port after Hunter hit a mine off Almeria that killed and wounded several British sailors. In June 1937, the German pocket battleship Deutschland arrived in Gibraltar with many dead and wounded, after Republican planes bombed it in Ibiza, in retaliation for the Condor Legion's bombing of Guernica. In August 1938, the Republican destroyer Jose Luis Diez took refuge in Gibraltar after taking casualties from the guns of the National cruiser Canarias. The one incident that resulted in the death of Gibraltarians occurred on 31 January 1938, when the insurgent submarine General Sanjurjo sank the SS Endymion, a small Gibraltar-registered freighter taking a cargo of coal to Cartagena, which was chartered by the Republican government. Eleven members of her crew were killed.

=== Second World War and after ===
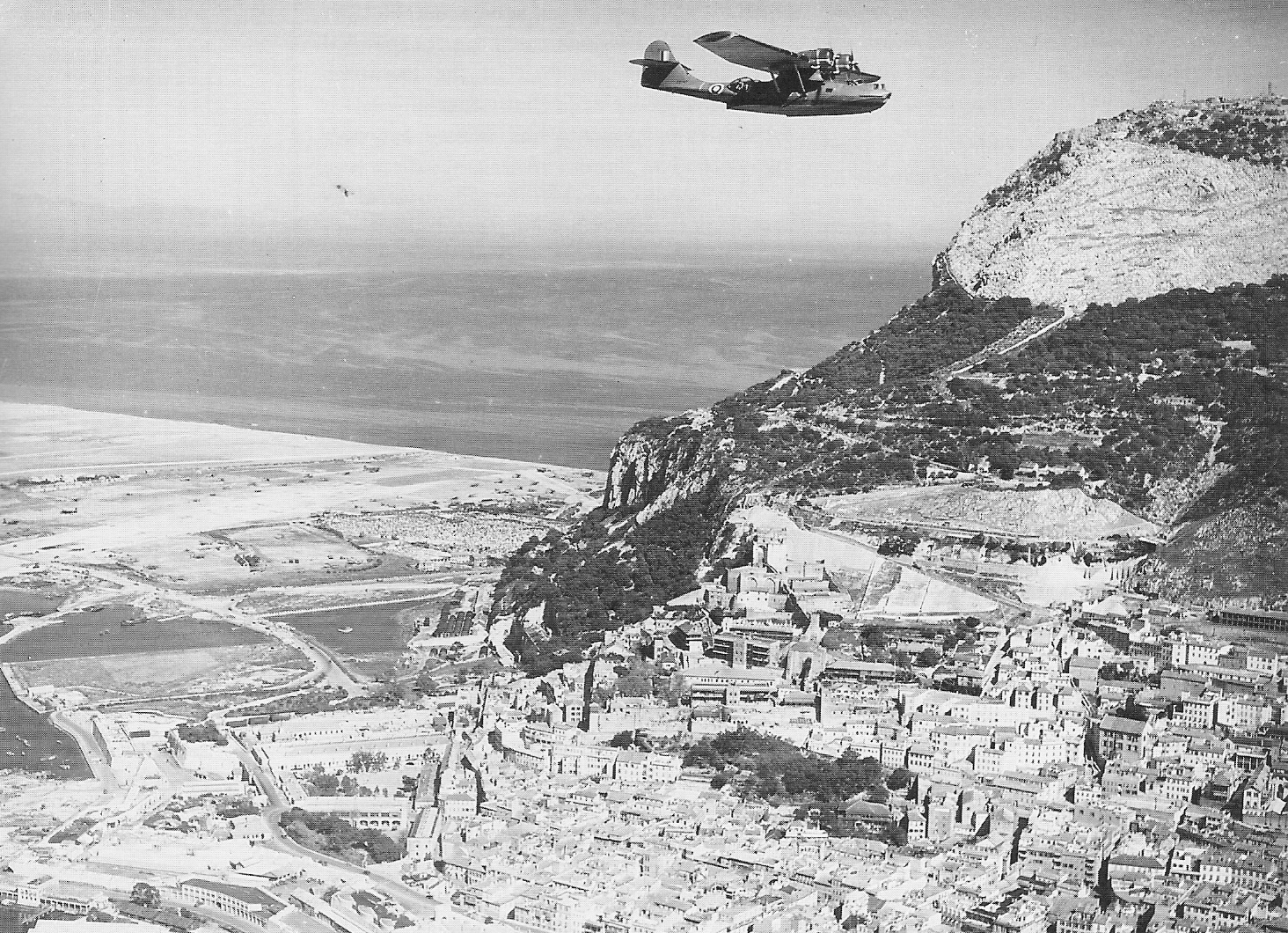
Military history of Gibraltar during World War II • Timeline of events • A Catalina flies by the North Front of the Rock as it leaves Gibraltar on a patrol, 1942 (Imperial War Museum)
Late 1939	Construction of a solid surface runway begins in Gibraltar.
9 Sep 1939	No. 202 Squadron RAF is ordered to Gibraltar.
25 Sep 1939	No 200 (Coastal) Group is formed as a subordinate formation to HQ RAF Mediterranean.
Jun 1940	13,500 civilian evacuees are shipped to Casablanca in French Morocco.
13 Jul 1940	Following the creation of Vichy France, Gibraltarian civilians are returned to Gibraltar prior to movement to other locations.
Jul 1940	Evacuees are shipped to the Atlantic island of Madeira and to London.
9 Oct 1940	1,093 refugees re-evacuated to Jamaica.
10 Mar 1941	Operation Felix, the German plan for the invasion of Gibraltar, is amended to become Operation Felix-Heinrich, which delays the invasion until after the fall of the Soviet Union, effectively putting an end to German invasion plans.
Late 1941	Plans for Operation Tracer, a stay-behind plan to be put in place in the event of an invasion of Gibraltar, are formulated.
Jan 1942	Equipment trials for Operation Tracer begin.
Mid-1942	Operation Tracer is pronounced ready for deployment.
Jul 1942	Lieutenant General Dwight D. Eisenhower is appointed Allied Commander-in-Chief of Operation Torch.
5 Nov 1942	Eisenhower arrives in Gibraltar to take command
4 Jul 1942	A Liberator bomber from RAF Transport Command takes off from Gibraltar and crashes, killing Władysław Sikorski, Polish military and political leader
Nov 1943	Resettlement Board established.
6 Apr 1944	First group of 1,367 repatriates arrives on Gibraltar directly from the United Kingdom.
28 May 1944	First repatriation party leaves Madeira for Gibraltar.
8 May 1945	Victory in Europe Day

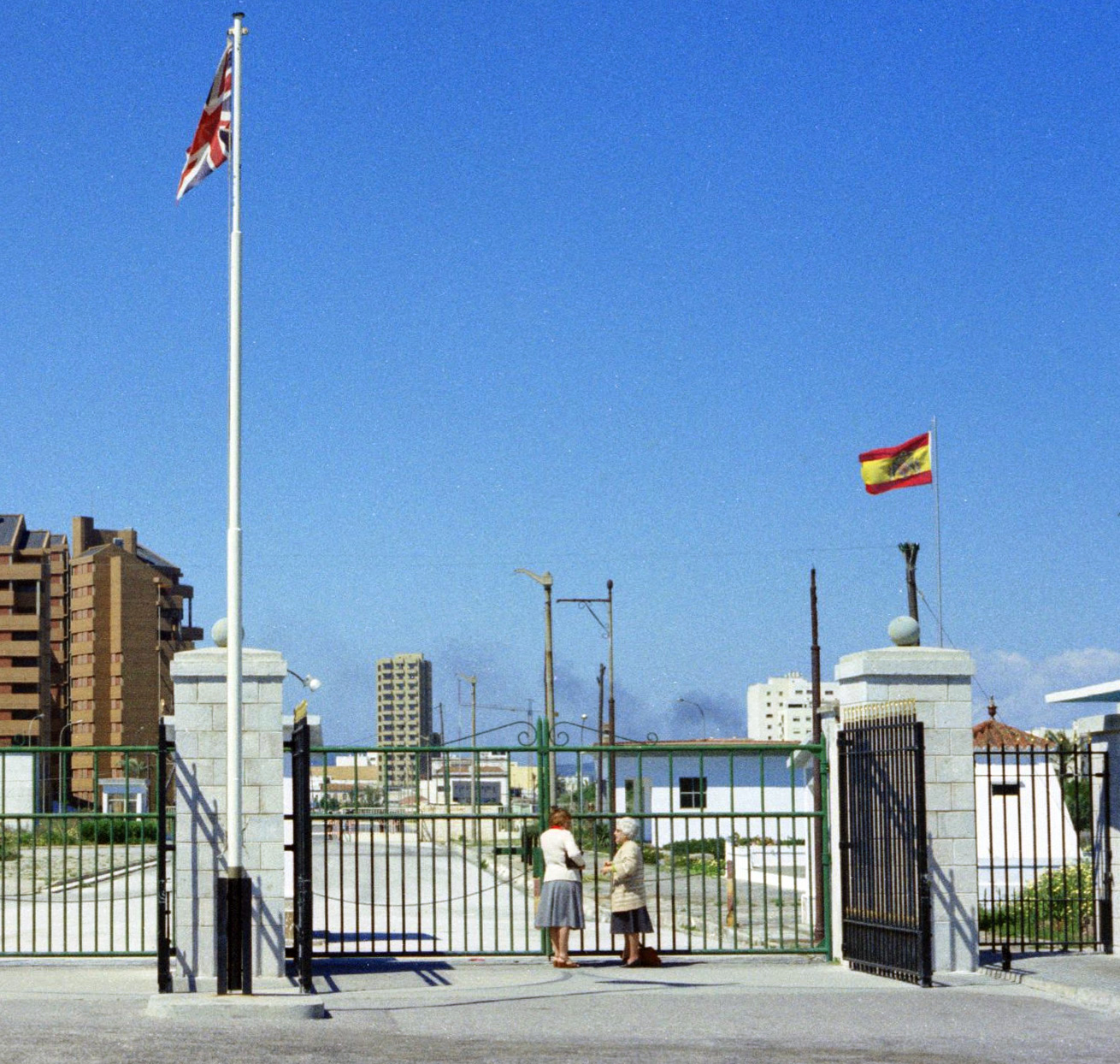
The closed Spanish gate at the border between Gibraltar and Spain, 1977

During World War II, the Rock was again turned into a fortress, and the civilian residents of Gibraltar were evacuated. Initially, in May 1940, 16,700 people went to French Morocco. However, after the French-German Armistice and the subsequent attack on Mers-el-Kébir, Algeria, by the British Navy in July 1940, the French-Moroccan authorities asked all Gibraltarian evacuees to be removed. 12,000 went to Britain, while about 3,000 went to Madeira or Jamaica, with the rest moving to Spain or Tangier. Control of Gibraltar gave the Allied Powers control of the entry to the Mediterranean Sea (the other side of the Strait being Spanish territory, and thus non-belligerent). The Rock was a key part of the Allied supply lines to Malta and North Africa, and the base of the British Navy Force H. Prior to the war, the racecourse on the isthmus was converted into an airbase, and a concrete runway was constructed (1938). The repatriation of the civilians started in 1944 and proceeded until 1951, causing considerable suffering and frustration. However, most of the population had returned by 1946.

- 1940 4 July – French bombers, based in French Morocco, carried out a retaliatory air raid over Gibraltar as a reprisal for the destruction of the French fleet at Mers-el-Kebir, Algeria, by the Force H (about 1,300 French sailors were killed and about 350 were wounded in the action against the French fleet).
- 1941 – Germany planned to occupy Gibraltar (and presumably hand it over to Spain) in "Operation Felix", which was due to start on 10 January 1941. It was cancelled because the Spanish government were reluctant to let the Wehrmacht enter Spain and then attack against the Rock, its civilians, or the British Army, from Spanish soil, because Franco feared that it may have been impossible to remove the Wehrmacht afterwards. In any case, Hitler was too busy elsewhere in Europe to give this much priority.
- 1940–1943 – The Gibraltarian harbour was attacked many times by Italian commando frogmen operating from Algeciras. Underwater warfare and countermeasures were developed by Lionel Crabb.
- 1942 September – A small group of Gibraltarians, who remained in the town serving in the British Army, joined a mechanic official, Albert Risso, to create 'The Gibraltarians Association', the starting point of what became the Association for the Advancement of Civil Rights (officially established in December that year), the first political party in Gibraltar. Joshua Hassan (a young lawyer then, and later Sir and Chief Minister) was among the leading members of the association. The AACR was the dominant party in Gibraltar politics for the last third of the 20th century.
- 1942 8 November – Operation Torch launched with support from Gibraltar.
- 1944 April – The situation in Gibraltar is considered safe and the first of the evacuees return to Gibraltar.
- 1946 – The United Kingdom inscribed Gibraltar in the list of non-self-governing territories kept by the UN Special Committee on Decolonization.
- 1950 – Gibraltar's first Legislative Council was opened.
- 1951 – The return process of the evacuees finishes. It was delayed due to an initial shortage of shipping and then of housing. The evacuation was a key element in the creation of the national conscience of Gibraltarians. Historians suggest that the evacuation contributed to a developing collective Gibraltarian identity.
- 1951 27 April – The RFA Bedenham explodes while docked in Gibraltar, killing 13, damaging many buildings in the town, and delaying the housing program essential for repatriation.
- 1954 – This was the 250th anniversary of its capture. Queen Elizabeth II visited Gibraltar, which angered General Franco, who renewed its claim to sovereignty, which had not been actively pursued for over 150 years. This led to the closure of the Spanish consulate, and to the imposition of restrictions on freedom of movement between Gibraltar and Spain. By the 1960s, motor vehicles were being restricted or banned from crossing the border, with only Spanish nationals employed on the Rock being allowed to enter Gibraltar.
- 1955 – At the United Nations, Spain, which had just been admitted to membership, initiated a claim to the territory, arguing that the principle of territorial integrity, not self-determination, applied in the case of the decolonization of Gibraltar, and that the United Kingdom should cede sovereignty of the Rock to Spain. Madrid gained diplomatic support from countries in Latin America, with the UN General Assembly passing resolutions (2231 (XXI), "Question of Gibraltar" and 2353 (XXII), "Question of Gibraltar").
- 1965 April – The British Government published a White Paper dealing with the question of Gibraltar and the Treaty of Utrecht.
- 1966 – In response, the Spanish Foreign Office Minister Fernando Castiella, published and presented the "Spanish Red Book" (named so because of its cover; its reference is "Negociaciones sobre Gibraltar. Documentos presentados a las Cortes Españolas por el Ministro de Asuntos Exteriores", Madrid, 1967) to the Spanish Courts.
- 1967 – The first sovereignty referendum was held on 10 September, in which Gibraltar's voters were asked whether they wished to either pass under Spanish sovereignty, or remain under British sovereignty, with institutions of self-government. Over 99% voted in favour of remaining British.
- 1968 A group of six Gibraltarian lawyers and businessmen, calling themselves the palomos or 'doves', advocated a political settlement with Spain in a letter published in the Gibraltar Chronicle, and met with Spanish Foreign Office officials (a meeting was even held with the Spanish Foreign Office Minister) to try to bring this about. This provoked widespread public hostility in Gibraltar (with attacks on their homes and properties and civil unrest). Things quickly calmed down, although today the term retains a negative meaning in Gibraltar politics.
- 1969 30 May – A new constitution for Gibraltar was introduced by the United Kingdom Parliament, under the initiative of the British Government (Gibraltar Constitution Order 1969). Under it, Gibraltar attained full internal self-government, with an elected House of Assembly. The City Council and the Legislative Council disappeared. The preamble to the Constitution stated that:

"Her Majesty's Government will never enter into arrangements under which the people of Gibraltar would pass under the sovereignty of another state against their freely and democratically expressed wishes."

- 1969 8 June – In response, Spain closed the border with Gibraltar, and severed all communication links. For about 13 years, the land border was closed from the Spanish side, to try to isolate the territory. The closure affected both sides of the border. Gibraltarians with families in Spain had to go by ferry to Tangier, Morocco, and from there to the Spanish port of Algeciras, while many Spanish workers (by then about 4,800; sixteen years before, about 12,500 Spanish workmen entered Gibraltar every day) lost their jobs in Gibraltar.
- 1969 – Major Robert (later Sir Robert) Peliza of the Integration with Britain Party (IWBP) was elected Chief Minister in alliance with the independent group led by Peter Isola.
- 1971 – The United Kingdom Government led by Heath considered the possibility of exchanging sovereignty for a 999-year lease on Gibraltar, as it was felt it had ceased to be of any military or economic value. The proposals remained secret until 2002.
- 1972 – Joshua Hassan of the Association for the Advancement of Civil Rights (AACR) was returned to power. AACR rebrands as GLP/AACR (Gibraltar Labour Party / AACR) in an attempt to develop a more clearly working-class image.
- 1972 – Gibraltar TGWU hold a 6-day General Strike, pressing the Ministry of Defence, Gibraltar's largest employer, for better pay and conditions for workers. The strike ends successfully with a £1.85 increase in basic pay rates, and is seen as a catalyst for increased working class solidarity in the pursuit of social, economic, and political change. TGWU claims a rise of overall union density within the labour market to around 55% following the strike.
- 1973 – Gibraltar joined the European Economic Community alongside the United Kingdom.
- 1975 – The British Foreign Office Minister Roy Hattersley ruled out integration with the UK, and stated that any constitutional change would have to involve a 'Spanish dimension'. This position was reaffirmed the following year, when the British government rejected the House of Assembly's proposals for constitutional reform (Hattersley Memorandum). The IWBP broke up and was succeeded by the Democratic Party of British Gibraltar (DPBG), led first by Maurice Xiberras, formerly of the IWBP, and subsequently by Peter Isola.
- 1975 – Spanish dictator General Francisco Franco died, but nothing changed in relation to Gibraltar.
- 1980 10 April – The British and Spanish ministers of Foreign Affairs, Lord Carrington and Marcelino Oreja, signs the Lisbon Agreement regarding 'The Gibraltar Problem', stating that the communications between Gibraltar and Spain would be re-established, and restating both Governments positions. The measures agreed were not implemented.
- 1980 July – The Anglican Diocese of Gibraltar is amalgamated with the Jurisdiction of North and Central Europe to become the Diocese of Gibraltar in Europe. The Cathedral of the Holy Trinity, Gibraltar remains the Anglican Cathedral for the Diocese.
- 1981 – The British Nationality Act 1981 effectively made Gibraltar a Dependent Territory and removed the right of entry into the UK of British Dependent Territory Citizens. After a short campaign, Gibraltarians were offered full British citizenship (History of nationality in Gibraltar). The act was ratified in 1983.

Gibraltarians entering Spain after the land border between Spain and Gibraltar was opened on 15 December 1982.

- 1982 15 December – The re-opening of the border was initially delayed due to the war between the United Kingdom and Argentina over the Falkland Islands. Upon the change in the Spanish government, with the Socialist Party in power, the border was partially re-opened (only pedestrians, residents of Gibraltar or Spanish nationals were allowed to cross the border by Spain; only one crossing each way per day was allowed). Restrictions on the land border continued until 2006, although there are still occasionally issues related to the crossing.
- 1984 – Spain applied to join the European Community, succeeding in 1986. Under the Brussels Agreement (27 November 1984) signed between the governments of the United Kingdom and Spain, the former agreed to enter into discussions with Spain over Gibraltar, including, for the first time, the "issues" of sovereignty. The border was fully reopened.
- 1987 2 December – A proposal for joint control of Gibraltar Airport with Spain met with widespread local opposition, which was expressed in a protest march to The Convent. Chief Minister Sir Joshua Hassan resigned at the end of the year and was succeeded by Adolfo Canepa.
- 1988 – Gibraltar Socialist Labour Party (GSLP) leader Joe Bossano was elected as Chief Minister, and firmly ruled out any discussions with Spain over sovereignty and shared use of the airport.
- 1988 7 March – The Special Air Service of the British Army during Operation Flavius shot dead three unarmed members of the Provisional IRA walking towards the frontier, claiming they were making "suspicious movements". A subsequent search led to the discovery of a car containing a large amount of Semtex explosive in Spain, which the decedents had intended for the Changing of the Guard ceremony a few days later.
- 1991 – The British Army effectively withdrew from Gibraltar, leaving only the locally recruited Royal Gibraltar Regiment, although the Royal Air Force and Royal Navy remain. Spain made various proposals involving the sovereignty of Gibraltar, which were rejected by all parties in the Gibraltar House of Assembly.
- 1991 – The Spanish Spanish Socialist Workers' Party (PSOE) government of Felipe González proposed joint sovereignty over Gibraltar with the United Kingdom. A similar proposal was advocated by Peter Cumming, formerly of the Gibraltar Social-Democrats (GSD), in which the Rock would become a self-governing condominium (or "Royal City"), with the British and Spanish monarchs as joint heads of state.
- 1995 – GSLP government lost popular support as a result of tobacco smuggling activity. To prevent this activity, the fast launches were made illegal and confiscated. This resulted in a riot in July 1995.
- 1996 – In a general election, Joe Bossano was replaced by Peter Caruana of the GSD, who, while favouring dialogue with Spain, also ruled out any deals on sovereignty.
- 1997 – The Partido Popular Spanish Foreign Minister, Abel Matutes made proposals under which Gibraltar would be under joint sovereignty for fifty years, before being fully incorporated into Spain, as an autonomous region, similar to Catalonia or the Basque Country, but these were rejected by the British Government.
- 2000 – An agreement was reached between the UK and Spain over recognition of 'competent authorities' in Gibraltar. Spain had a policy of non-recognition of the Government of Gibraltar as a 'competent authority', therefore refusing to recognise Gibraltar's courts, police and government departments, driving licences, and identity cards. Under the agreement, the Foreign and Commonwealth Office in London would act as a 'post box', through which Gibraltar's police and other government departments could communicate with their counterparts in Spain. In addition, identity documents issued by the Government of Gibraltar now featured the words 'United Kingdom'.
- 2000 May – 2001 May – Following an incident at sea, the nuclear submarine HMS Tireless (S88) was repaired in Gibraltar, causing diplomatic tension with Spain. Before consenting to the repair, the Government of Gibraltar insisted on a full safety assessment.

=== Twenty-first century ===
- 2001 – The UK Government announced plans to reach a final agreement with Spain over the future of Gibraltar, which would involve shared sovereignty; however agreement was not reached due to the opposition of the Gibraltarians.
- 2002 – On 12 July, the Foreign Secretary, Jack Straw, in a formal statement in the House of Commons, said that after twelve months of negotiation, the British Government and Spain are in broad agreement on many of the principles that should underpin a lasting settlement of Spain's sovereignty claim, which included the principle that Britain and Spain should share sovereignty over Gibraltar. Political commentators saw this as an attempt by Britain to get Spain to help counterbalance France and Germany's domination of the European Union. Straw visited Gibraltar to explain his ideas and was left in no doubt they had no support.
- 2002 – In November, the Government of Gibraltar called Gibraltar's second sovereignty referendum on the proposal. It received a turnout of 88%, of which 98.97% of the electorate did not support the position taken by Mr Straw.

The actual voting was as follows: 18,176 voted representing 87.9% of the electorate. There were 89 papers spoilt, of which 72 were blank. 18,087 papers remained, with 187 voting YES, and 17,900 voting NO. The Referendum was supervised by a team of international observers headed by the Labour MP Gerald Kaufman, who certified that it had been held fairly, freely, and democratically.

- 2002 – The British Overseas Territories Act 2002 made provision for the renaming of British Dependent Territories as British Overseas Territories, which changed the status of Gibraltar to an Overseas Territory. This act granted full British citizenship to British Overseas Territories, which was already available to Gibraltarians since 1983.

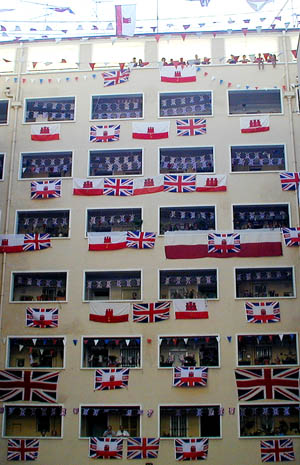
Tercentenary celebrations in Gibraltar, flags fly everywhere.

- 2004 August – Gibraltar celebrated 300 years of British rule. Spanish officials labelled this as the celebration of 300 years of British occupation.

Despite this, Gibraltar celebrated its tercentenary, with a number of events on 4 August, including the population encircling the Rock holding hands, and granting the Freedom of the City to the Royal Navy.

- 2004 18 November – A joint commission (Comisión mixta de Cooperación y Colaboración) was established between the Mancomunidad de Municipios de la Comarca del Campo de Gibraltar (the Council Association of the Campo de Gibraltar, the historic Spanish county that surrounds Gibraltar) and the Government of Gibraltar.
- 2004 28 October – The governments of the United Kingdom and Spain agreed to allow the Government of Gibraltar equal representation in a new open agenda discussion forum (so-called Tripartite Talks).
- 2005 July – First Tripartite Talks took place in Faro, Portugal.
- 2006 August – The following was announced:

The three participants confirm that the necessary preparatory work related to agreements on the airport, pensions, telephones and fence/border issues, carried out during the last 18 months, has been agreed. Accordingly, they have decided to convene in Spain the first Ministerial meeting of the Tripartite Forum of Dialogue on Gibraltar on 18 September 2006.

- 2006 18 September - Córdoba agreement: The British and Spanish foreign ministers and the Chief Minister of Gibraltar met at the Palacio de Viana, Córdoba and announced the following:

1. Spain agrees to recognize Gibraltar's international dialling code (350) and allow mobile roaming.
2. Spanish restrictions on civil flights at the airport will be removed. A new terminal building will also be constructed, allowing a direct passage to/from the north side of the fence/frontier (in order to overcome problems of terminology relating to references to the words "frontier" or "fence", the phrase "fence/frontier" is used in the documents).
3. There will be normality of traffic flow at the fence/frontier.
4. Britain agrees to pay uprated pensions to those Spanish citizens who lost their livelihoods when the border was unilaterally closed by Francisco Franco in 1969.
5. A branch of the Instituto Cervantes will be opened in Gibraltar.

This agreement has been described as a significant development in tripartite relations.

- 2006 November – The new constitution was drafted and later approved by the people of Gibraltar in a referendum. It was described as non-colonial in nature by Britain and Gibraltar. However, UK Europe Minister Jim Murphy, told the Foreign Affairs Committee of the House of Commons that the new Constitution is a "modernization", but stated that "[I have] never described it as an end to the colonial relationship."
- 2006 16 December – The first passenger carrying Iberia aircraft landed in Gibraltar flying directly from Madrid, and a daily scheduled service started. The service was later reduced in frequency and terminated in September 2008.
- 2007 10 February – Spain lifted restrictions on Gibraltar's ability to expand and modernize its telecommunications infrastructure. These included a refusal to recognize International Direct Dialling (IDD) code, which restricted the expansion of Gibraltar's telephone numbering plan, and the prevention of roaming arrangements for Gibraltar's GSM mobile phones in Spain.
- 2007 1 May - GB Airways began scheduled flights between Madrid and Gibraltar, which were later withdrawn in September.
- 2007 29 June – With a unanimous vote in the Gibraltar Parliament, local MPs approved new legislation that removes the phrases 'the Colony' and 'UK possession' from Gibraltar's laws.
- 2007 11 October - The Gibraltar Social Democrats were returned to Government for a fourth term after a General Election.
- 2008 18 June – In the annual UN Special Committee on Decolonization meeting on the Gibraltar question, Peter Caruana, Chief Minister of Gibraltar stated that he would not attend future meetings, as the Gibraltar Government is of the opinion that "there is no longer any need for us to look to the Committee to help us bring about our decolonization". The Committee agreed that the Question of Gibraltar would be discussed again next year.
- 2008 22 September – It was announced that the remaining Iberia flights to Madrid would cease operation at the end of September 2008 due to "economic reasons", namely lack of demand.
- 2008 10 October – The bulk carrier MV Fedra ran aground on rocks at Europa Point, and broke in two. The crew were safely rescued, but some of the fuel oil escaped in the very bad weather. The Captain was later arrested.
- 2009 May - A number of Spanish incursions into British Waters around Gibraltar led to intervention by the police and a diplomatic protest by the UK.
- 2009 July 21 - Spanish Foreign Minister Miguel Angel Moratinos visits Gibraltar for talks with the local government and his British counterpart David Miliband, the first visit by a Spanish minister since Britain captured the Rock.
- 2009 7 December - four armed Civil Guard officers are detained after three landed in Gibraltar in pursuit of two suspected smugglers, who were themselves arrested. The Spanish Interior Minister Alfredo Pérez Rubalcaba personally telephoned Chief Minister Peter Caruana to apologize, stating that there were "no political intentions" behind the incident. The Chief Minister was prepared to accept it had not been a political act. Spanish officers were released by the Police the following day, who said that "Enquiries established that the Guardia Civil mistakenly entered Gibraltar Territorial Waters in hot pursuit and have since apologised for their actions"
- 2009 12 December - Miss Gibraltar Kaiane Aldorino wins the title Miss World in Johannesburg. Her homecoming five days later is a major public event in Gibraltar.
- 2009 17 December - A ferry service restarts between Gibraltar and Algeciras after 40 years.
- 2010 - To overcome budget problems following the departure and arrest of the previous mayor, the mayor of La Linea de la Conception proposes a toll for entry to Gibraltar, and to tax telephone lines to Gibraltar. The proposals are opposed by the Spanish Government and the Gibraltar government has dismissed concerns.
- 2011 - GSLP / Liberal Alliance returned to power in the 2011 General Election, bringing to an end 15 years of GSD Government. Fabian Picardo becomes Chief Minister.
- 2016 – In the UK-wide EU referendum held on 23 June, Gibraltar voted 95.9% to remain in the EU (19,322 to 823).
- 2020 - British exit from the EU renders Gibraltar foreign territory, but Spain retains the 'status quo', pending further negotiations. A preliminary agreement avoids a hard border between Gibraltar and Spain
- 2024 - British Foreign Secretary David Lammy reaffirms that Gibraltar's position as a British Overseas Territory is "not up for negotiation", following controversy around the UK's decision to relinquish control of the Chagos Islands (part of the British Indian Ocean Territory).

== See also ==
- History of Spain
- History of the United Kingdom

== Bibliography ==
- Hills, George (1974). Rock of Contention. A History of Gibraltar. London: Robert Hale. ISBN 0-7091-4352-4.
- Jackson, William (1990). The Rock of the Gibraltarians. A History of Gibraltar (second ed.). Grendon, Northamptonshire, UK: Gibraltar Books. ISBN 0-948466-14-6.
- Sepúlveda, Isidro (2004). Gibraltar. La razón y la fuerza (Gibraltar. The reason and the force). in Spanish. Madrid: Alianza Editorial. ISBN 84-206-4184-7. Chapter 2, "La lucha por Gibraltar" (The Struggle for Gibraltar) is available online (PDF)
- Peter Gold (2005). Gibraltar: British or Spanish?. Routledge. ISBN 0-415-34795-5.
