= Brussels Agreement (1984) =

1984 treaty between Britain and Spain on the status of Gibraltar

The Brussels Agreement, 1984, was an agreement between the governments of the United Kingdom and of Spain concerning the territorial dispute over Gibraltar. The agreement was criticised by Gibraltar politicians for limiting the participation of Gibraltarians in their self-determination.

== Background ==
The Lisbon Agreement, 1980, did not provide an immediate solution to the problems resulting from the blockade of Gibraltar that had been imposed by Francisco Franco in 1969. The border did not reopen as planned, and London and Madrid continued to disagree over the interpretation of the agreement. Spain's admittance to NATO and the EEC provided the impetus that finally broke the deadlock in 1984.

== Terms ==
The Brussels Agreement was concluded in November 1984 and implemented in February 1985. Spain's application to join the EEC proved to be the key factor since Britain linked Spain's membership with the opening of the frontier with Gibraltar and threatened to veto the application otherwise. The Brussels Agreement clarified and reactivated the earlier Lisbon Agreement, which had been subject to widely-differing interpretations, complicated Anglo-Spanish relations and delayed the full opening of the border. Under the agreement, the United Kingdom and Spain would hold talks over Gibraltar, and the British were prepared to negotiate on sovereignty. The agreement was signed by the Foreign and Commonwealth Secretary, Sir Geoffrey Howe, and the Spanish Foreign Minister, Fernando Morán López.

These were key points of the Brussels agreement:

- Provision of equality and reciprocity of rights for Spaniards in Gibraltar and Gibraltarians in Spain.
- The establishment of the free movement of persons, vehicles and goods between Gibraltar and the neighbouring territory.
- The establishment of a negotiating process aimed at overcoming all the differences between Spain and the United Kingdom over Gibraltar.

== Criticism ==
The agreement was vocally criticised in Gibraltar since the Gibraltar government was invited to participate, but only as part of the United Kingdom's delegation. Another major deficiency from Gibraltar's perspective was that it did not allow for the discussion of differences between Gibraltar and Spain. The agreement was also criticised by Gibraltar politicians as the Gibraltar delegation was expected to form part of

the delegation of the colonising power from which it seeks in its own decolonisation.

— The Honourable Joe Bossano

== Aftermath ==
In the key 1988 elections, the Gibraltar Socialist Labour Party called for self-determination, expressed its opposition to the negotiations over the sovereignty and future of Gibraltar between Spain and the United Kingdom and opposed any transfer of sovereignty to Spain. It also asked for the withdrawal of the negotiations on the Brussels Declaration and opposed the Airport Agreement. The GSLP got 8 seats and a 58.2% of the popular vote.

== See also ==
- Gibraltar Constitution Order 1969
- Lisbon Agreement, 1980
- 2002 Gibraltar sovereignty referendum
- Gibraltar Constitution Order 2006
- Cordoba Agreement, 2006
