= Telephone numbers in Gibraltar =

- Country: Gibraltar
- Continent: Europe
- Regulator: Gibraltar Regulatory Authority
- Country code: +350
- International access: 00
- Long-distance: None

The Gibraltar telephone numbering plan is the system used for assigning telephone numbers in the British Overseas Territory of Gibraltar. It is regulated by the Gibraltar Regulatory Authority (GRA), which holds responsibility for telecommunications.

The country calling code to Gibraltar is +350, which was assigned to the territory by the International Telecommunication Union in the late 1960s. When calling abroad from Gibraltar, the international call prefix is 00.

== History ==
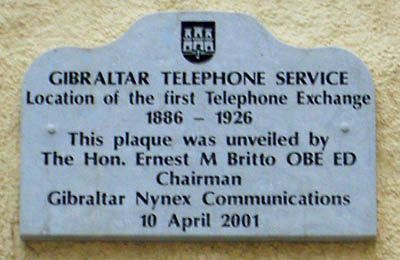
Site of the first telephone exchange in City Mill Lane.

Gibraltar's first telephone exchange was set up in 1886 as a private enterprise and then taken over by the Government of Gibraltar. In the 1970s there were three generations of automatic telephone exchange equipment in use with four and five-digit numbers, the latter prefixed with the digit '7'.

The volume of calls grew and a System X digital exchange was installed and was taken over by a privatised telephone operator, Gibtel, which also operate a GSM network.

Direct telephone connections between Gibraltar and Spain were severed in 1969, when land communications between both territories were halted by the government of Francisco Franco, as a result of the Spanish sovereignty claim, and were not restored until 1986.

However, Gibraltar remained subject to restrictions after that date, which affected the expansion and modernisation of Gibraltar's telecommunications infrastructure. These included a refusal to recognise Gibraltar's International Direct Dialling (IDD) code (+350) which restricted the expansion of Gibraltar's telephone numbering plan, and the prevention of roaming arrangements for Gibraltar GSM mobile phones in Spain and vice versa. Following the signing of the Córdoba Accord between the Governments of Gibraltar, the United Kingdom and Spain in September 2006, these restrictions were removed with effect from 10 February 2007.

== New numbering plan ==
Since 1 October 2008 telephone numbers for landlines and mobile phones in Gibraltar have been eight digits long. Prior to this date, landline numbers consisted of five digits starting with either 4, 5 or 7, while mobile phone numbers remained unchanged. Since this date all calls to existing Gibtelecom five-digit landline number have to be prefixed with 200, making the numbers eight digits long.

Thus 52200 became 20052200 and when dialled from outside Gibraltar +350 20052200.

CTS (Gibraltar) Limited, an alternative telecommunications provider began to offer a landline service prefixed with 216 and a mobile service with numbers prefixed by 606. This company ceased to operate in 2013.

Since September 2015, u-mee, a provider of fibre broadband services, has offered a fixed line telephone service called U-mee Talk, in which numbers will be prefixed with the digits 222.

Since late 2017, Gibfibrespeed, a provider of fibre broadband services, has offered a fixed line telephone service, in which numbers are prefixed with the digits 225, The GRA itself has announced regular updates to the numbering plan, and Gibfibrespeed as a fixed line operator is also licensed to provide carrier routing and transit services.

In 2024, Gibraltar adopted 999 as its emergency services number, for police, ambulance or fire and rescue; the Royal Gibraltar Police said this was chosen because Gibraltar was closely aligned with the UK, with the aim in future being to have a unified control room.

== See also ==
- Communications in Gibraltar
- Telecom dispute between Gibraltar and Spain
