= Status of Gibraltar =

Political dispute in the Iberian Peninsula

Status of Gibraltar Gibraltar
- Flag

Government
  - Type: Parliamentary democracy within a constitutional monarchy
  - Monarch: Charles III
  - Governor: Ben Bathurst
  - Chief Minister: Fabian Picardo
  - Density: 5,000/km^{2} (13,000/sq mi)
- Population figures from the Government of Gibraltar.
- Time zone: UTC+1
  - Summer (DST): UTC+2
- ISO 3166 code: GI

Gibraltar, a British Overseas Territory, located at the southern tip of the Iberian Peninsula, is the subject of a territorial claim by Spain. It was captured in 1704 during the War of the Spanish Succession (1701–1714). The Spanish Crown formally ceded the territory in perpetuity to the British Crown in 1713, under Article X of the Treaty of Utrecht. Spain later attempted to recapture the territory during the thirteenth siege (1727) and the Great Siege (1779–1783). British sovereignty over Gibraltar was confirmed in later treaties signed in Seville (1729) and the Treaty of Paris (1783).

Reclamation of the territory became government policy under the dictatorial regime of Francisco Franco, and this policy has remained in place under successive governments following the Spanish transition to democracy. The Gibraltarians themselves reject any such claim and no political party or pressure group in Gibraltar supports union with Spain. In a referendum in 2002 the people of Gibraltar rejected a joint sovereignty proposal on which Spain and the United Kingdom were said to have reached "broad agreement". The British Government now refuses to discuss sovereignty without the consent of the Gibraltarians, whereas Spain insists on a bilateral agreement with the UK over sovereignty.

In 2000, a political declaration of unity was signed by the members of the Gibraltar Parliament; according to the Gibraltar government, "In essence the declaration stated that the people of Gibraltar will never compromise, give up or trade their sovereignty or their right to self-determination; that Gibraltar wants good, neighbourly, European relations with Spain; and that Gibraltar belongs to the people of Gibraltar and is neither Spain's to claim nor Britain's to give away."

The United Nations understanding of the positions of each party is set out in their 2016 report. The UN currently lists Gibraltar as a Non-Self-Governing Territory.

== Background and history ==
=== Capture of Gibraltar and the Treaty of Utrecht ===
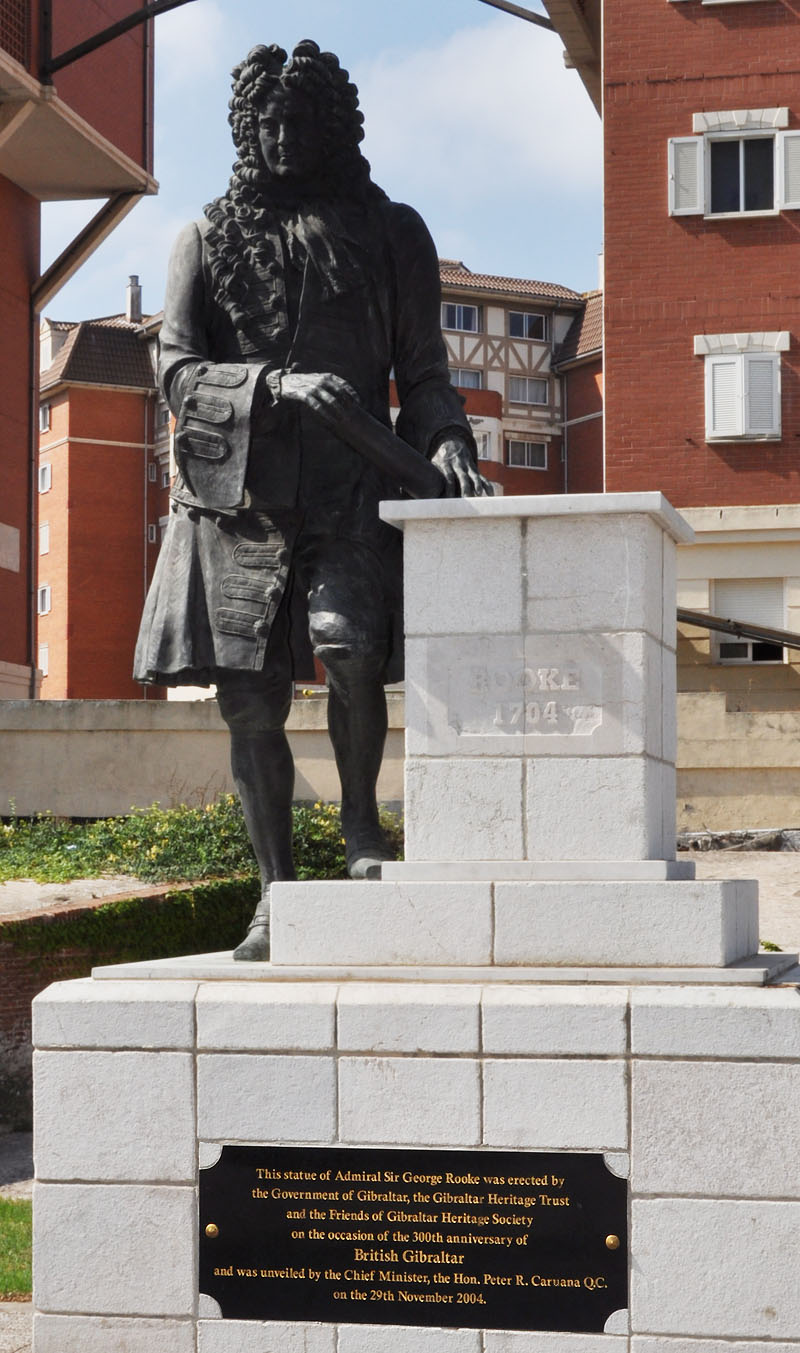
Statue of Admiral Sir George Rooke at Waterport Avenue in Gibraltar

Gibraltar was captured in 1704 by a force led by Admiral Sir George Rooke representing the Grand Alliance on behalf of the Archduke Charles, pretender to the Spanish Throne. After the battle, almost all of the inhabitants decided to leave. Spanish attempts to regain the territory in the Twelfth siege of Gibraltar failed, and it was eventually ceded to the Kingdom of Great Britain by Spain in the 1713 Treaty of Utrecht as part of the settlement of the War of the Spanish Succession. In that treaty, Spain ceded to Great Britain "the full and entire propriety of the town and castle of Gibraltar, together with the port, fortifications, and forts thereunto belonging ... for ever, without any exception or impediment whatsoever."

Should the British Crown ever wish to relinquish Gibraltar, a reversion clause holds that the territory would first be offered to Spain: "And in case it shall hereafter seem meet to the Crown of Great Britain to grant, sell or by any means to alienate therefrom the propriety of the said town of Gibraltar, it is hereby agreed and concluded that the preference of having the sale shall always be given to the Crown of Spain before any others."

Furthermore, the Treaty stipulates "that the above-named propriety be yielded to Great Britain without any territorial jurisdiction and without any open communication by land with the country round about" (although there is dispute over whether this disclaims territorial jurisdiction over Gibraltar, or over the "country round about") and that no overland trade between Gibraltar and Spain is to take place, except for emergency provisions in the case that Gibraltar is unable to be resupplied by sea. The British Government and the Government of Gibraltar have argued that the membership of both Gibraltar and Spain in the European Union (EU) — Gibraltar was included as a Special member state territory when the United Kingdom joined the EU in 1973; Spain joined the EU in 1986 – superseded such restrictions as the EU is committed to free movement of goods and services. The effect of Brexit on Gibraltar is unclear.

=== Spanish irredentism ===
There has been strong Spanish objection to the separation of Gibraltar from Spain since British acquisition in the Treaty of Utrecht (1713) in the aftermath of the Spanish War of Succession.

Calls for Gibraltar to rejoin Spain was sometimes paired with a desire for Spain and Portugal to merge into one unified Iberian nation. During the Spanish Civil War, both the Carlists and the Falange promoted the incorporation of Gibraltar into Spain, along with Portugal. The Carlists stated that a Carlist Spain would retake Gibraltar and conquer Portugal. After the victory of the Nationalist faction led by Francisco Franco in the Civil War, radical members of the Falange called for the incorporation of Gibraltar into Spain, along with Portugal and the French Pyrenees.

Desire for Spanish control over Gibraltar was also sometimes paired with desire to maintain Spanish colonial control over Morocco, especially in the years following the Second World War. According to the Africanist Tomás García Figueras "Spain and Morocco are like two halves of the same geographical unity". Historian Jaume Vicens Vives (1940) talked about a "vital space" conceptualised as a "geopolitical basic unit". Rodolfo Gil Benumeya traced the links back to the Neolithic Era, pointing to a common Ibero-Berber people living on both sides of the Strait. Gil Benumeya and Hernández Pacheco stressed the strengthening of those links due to Morocco once being "Mauritania Tingitana", part of the Roman Diocese of Hispania. Some of these authors, transcending historical arguments, even pointed at the Spanish-African union during "the Tertiary Epoch" when the Strait did not exist.

== Differing positions ==
The United Nations regards Gibraltar as a Non-Self-Governing Territory administered by the United Kingdom of Great Britain and Northern Ireland. Its report of February 2016 sets out the differing views of the various parties relating to Gibraltar.

The Gibraltar Constitution Order 2006 (UK) established a form of government for Gibraltar, with the governor of Gibraltar being responsible for the conduct of external affairs, defence, internal security and for certain appointments to public office, and the Government of Gibraltar being responsible for all other matters. The UK believes that as an independent territory, recognised by the United Nations, Gibraltar enjoys the individual and collective rights that are set out in the 2006 constitution and the right of self-determination.

Spain disputes the legality of the 2006 constitution and claims that it does not change the status of Gibraltar as a British colony with only the UK having right to discuss Gibraltar matters at the international level.

The territorial government of Gibraltar, based on law in the 2006 constitution, collects its own taxes and budgets its costs and capital expenditure, with maximum personal tax rates of 28% and company tax of 10%. Spain notes that the European Commission is investigating the tax regime of Gibraltar and that Spain considers Gibraltar a tax haven. The UK believes Gibraltar meets all EU laws relating to anti-money-laundering, direct taxation and financial supervision.

Gibraltar has a robust financial regulation system with anti-tax-evasion agreements including exchange of tax information agreements with 79 countries including all the EU countries, except Spain which has not responded. The UK asked for Gibraltar to be subject to an EU evaluation of its anti-money-laundering controls. Spain recalls that crimes of tobacco smuggling and money-laundering from Gibraltar had been noted in an EU anti fraud report in 2014.

Until July 15, 2026, crossing the land border between Gibraltar and Spain was subject to checks. Spain stressed that checks are not politically motivated, it being necessary to ensure strict compliance with EU border regulations to counter the common illicit trafficking issues and that Spain complies with the recommendations from the EU to improve the border crossing. The location of the checkpoint did not conform to the border recognised by Spain. The airport is a military area where civilian aircraft are permitted to operate. Spain claims the airfield is occupied illegally by the UK. The UK claims its sovereignty extends over the isthmus area on which the airfield is built. The UK also claims a three-mile limit in the territorial waters around Gibraltar whereas Spain claims maritime rights to all areas except inside the ports on Gibraltar. UK claims of incursions of Spanish vessels into Gibraltar territorial waters are considered by Spain to reflect routine activity of Spanish ships in their own waters.

In 2004 a system of trilateral discussion began with Spain, the UK and Gibraltar participating. The discussions ended in 2010 with the UK and Gibraltar asking for their continuance from 2012 to 2014. Spain stating they believed the forum no longer existed and that only ad hoc discussions on local issues should take place with Campo de Gibraltar also included.

In 2015 the UK reaffirmed its claim to sovereignty, that Gibraltar had its right to self-determination set out in the 2006 constitution and that the UK would not enter into any sovereignty discussions unless Gibraltar agreed and further that the UK was committed to safeguarding Gibraltar, its people and its economy. The UK claimed sovereignty over land extended over the sea to a limit of three miles or to the median line under the UN convention on the Law of the Sea. Any discussion must include Gibraltar as their constitution gave them sole powers over many issues.

Gibraltar claimed it remained the last colony in Europe only because the Government of Spain insisted the inalienable principle of self-determination should not apply to Gibraltarians, with Spain blocking the annual request for Gibraltar to be removed from the UN list of non-self-governing territories. The Gibraltarian government asserts that Gibraltar has been effectively decolonised.

=== British position ===
In his evidence to the UK Parliament Foreign Affairs Committee in 2008, Jim Murphy MP, Minister of State for Europe stated:

The UK Government will never enter into an agreement on sovereignty without the agreement of the Government of Gibraltar and their people. In fact, we will never even enter into a process without that agreement. The word 'never' sends a substantial and clear commitment and has been used for a purpose. We have delivered that message with confidence to the peoples and the Governments of Gibraltar and Spain. It is a sign of the maturity of our relationship now that that is accepted as the UK's position.

The British Government has ruled out the independence of Gibraltar because, according to the British view, under the Treaty of Utrecht it would require Spanish consent, and has ruled out Gibraltar's integration into the United Kingdom.

I will note that, in the view of Her Majesty's Government, Gibraltar's right of self determination is not constrained by the Treaty of Utrecht except in so far as Article X gives Spain the right of refusal should Britain ever renounce Sovereignty. Thus independence would only be an option with Spanish consent.

The option of integration was rejected on 26 June 1976, when the British Government issued the Hattersley Memorandum ruling out integration to "avoid innovations which might result in prolongation of the frontier restrictions imposed by Spain."

=== Gibraltarian position ===
Gibraltar argues that the Spanish claims are baseless, pointing to the right to self-determination of all peoples, guaranteed and enshrined by the UN, according to the UN Charter. Its article 1 states that "The Purposes of the United Nations are ... to develop friendly relations among nations based on respect for the principle of equal rights and self-determination of peoples."

To the same section 2 of Resolution 1514 (XV) states: "All peoples have the right to self-determination; by virtue of that right they freely determine their political status and freely pursue their economic, social and cultural development."

Furthermore, resolution 2231 (XXI) itself recalls and demands implementation of Resolution 1514(XV) (guaranteeing Gibraltar's right to self-determination) and therefore it believes that the Spanish claim for its territorial integrity (which would not be affected by Gibraltar's decolonisation) cannot displace or extinguish the rights of the people of Gibraltar under resolution 1514(XV) or under the Charter. From this point of view, any additional right that Spain could claim by virtue of the "reversionary" clause contained in the Treaty of Utrecht is overruled and annulled under article 103 of the UN Charter: " In the event of a conflict between the obligations of the Members of the United Nations under the present Charter and their obligations under any other international agreement, their obligations under the present Charter shall prevail."

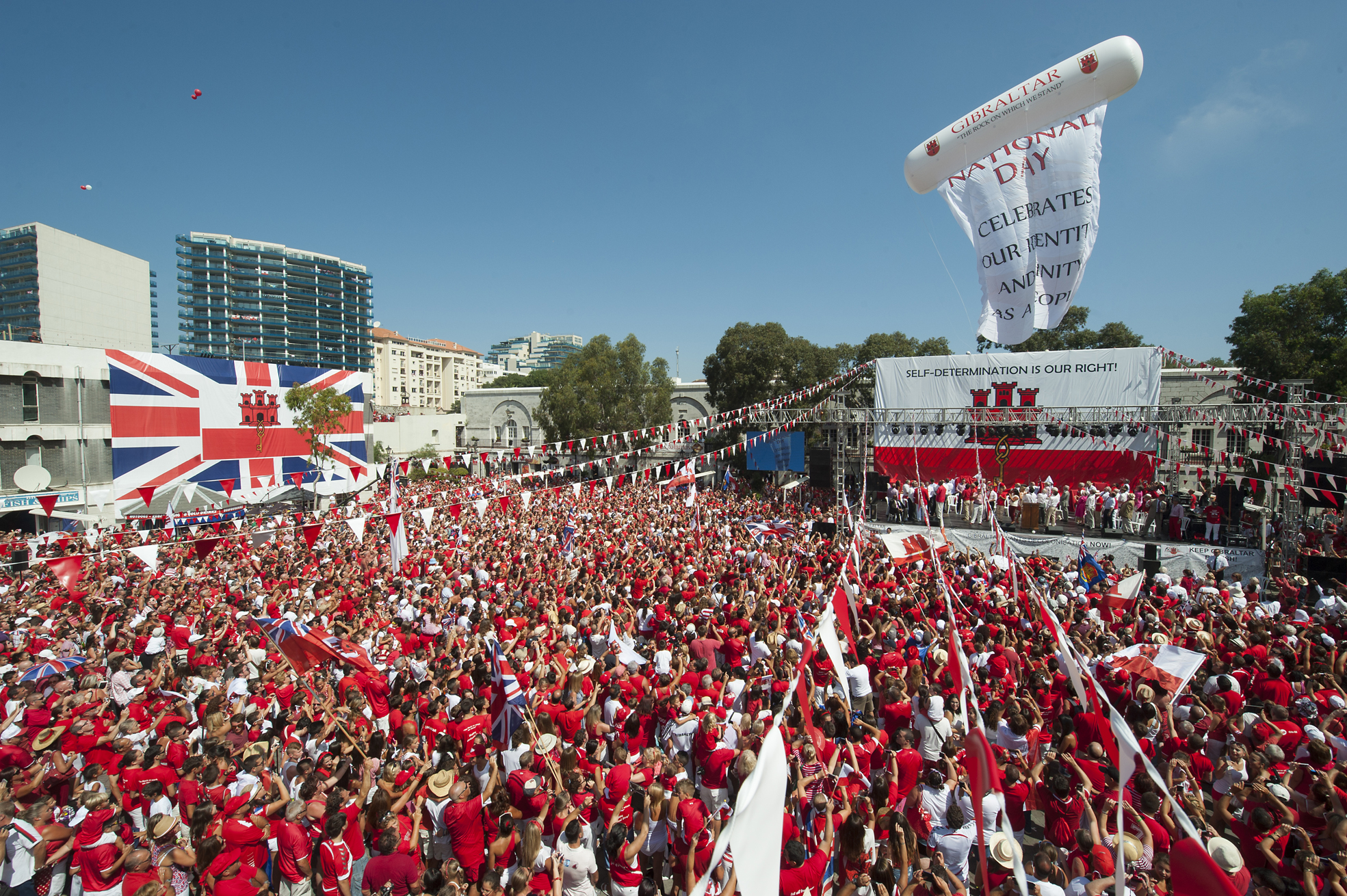
Gibraltar National Day, 2013

Finally, it is argued that there is in fact no principle in International Law or UN doctrine that can displace the inalienable right to self-determination. In this regard, in 2008, the UN 4th Committee rejected the claim that a dispute over sovereignty affected self-determination, affirming it to be a basic human right.

The Gibraltar Government has also argued that Gibraltar is a British territory and therefore by definition not an integral part of any other state, implying that Spain's territorial integrity cannot be affected by anything that occurs in Gibraltar: "Even if integration of a territory was demanded by an interested State it could not be had without ascertaining the freely expressed will of the people, the very sine qua non of all decolonisation."

In a referendum held in Gibraltar in September 2002, Gibraltarian voters rejected even partial Spanish sovereignty.

Gibraltarians seem to remain distrustful of Spain despite improved relations. In 2022, following increased pressure from the Spanish government, Chief Minister Fabian Picardo said "Gibraltar will never be Spanish".

=== Spanish position ===
The traditional Spanish position is based on territorial integrity, as per UN Resolution 1514 (XV) (1960), which according to Spain, complements and constrains the right to self-determination:

Any attempt aimed at the partial or total disruption of the national unity and the territorial integrity of a country is incompatible with the purposes and principles of the Charter of the United Nations.

During the 1960s, the UN General Assembly passed five resolutions on the issue (2231 (XXI), "Question of Gibraltar" and 2353 (XXII), "Question of Gibraltar"). The resolutions on the decolonisation of Gibraltar focused on the "interests" and not the "wishes" of the Gibraltarians. The latter resolution states that:

any colonial situation which partially or completely destroys the national unity and territorial integrity of a country is incompatible with the purposes and principles of the Charter of the United Nations and especially with paragraph 6 of Resolution 1514 (XV) of the General Assembly [...] Invites the Governments of Spain and the United Kingdom of Great Britain and Northern Ireland to resume without delay the negotiations provided for in General Assembly Resolutions 2070 (XX) and 2231 (XXI), with a view to putting an end to the colonial situation in Gibraltar and to safeguarding the interests of the population.

From such a point of view, Gibraltarians are seen as mere "settlers" from the United Kingdom and other countries and only their interests, not their wishes (as the right to self-determination would involve), need be safeguarded. The point of view that they were settlers is supported by the fact that following the 1704 capture of Gibraltar by Anglo-Dutch troops, only around 70 out of the original 5,000 Spanish inhabitants chose to remain in Gibraltar. Therefore, Spain has insisted that the Gibraltar dispute is a purely bilateral matter with the United Kingdom and has ignored the role and will of the Gibraltarians.

The first formal proposal on how to achieve the return of Gibraltar to Spain was made on 18 May 1966 by the Spanish Minister of Foreign Affairs, Fernando Castiella. The proposal comprised three clauses:

1. "The cancellation of the Treaty of Utrecht and the subsequent return of Gibraltar to Spain."
2. "The stay of the British base in Gibraltar, its use being subject to a specific Anglo-Spanish agreement."
3. "A 'Personal Statute' for Gibraltarians, under United Nations guarantee, protecting their cultural, social and economic interest in Gibraltar or anywhere else in Spain, including their British nationality. An 'appropriate ... administrative formula' should be also agreed."

The proposal was rejected by the British Government and by the Gibraltarians, which overwhelmingly voted to remain under British sovereignty in a referendum held in 1967 (12,138 to 44).

As a result, the UN General Assembly, during its twenty-third session, adopted resolution 2429 of 1968 (XXIII), denounced the 1967 referendum and requested the United Kingdom not to delay negotiations.

No further advance for the Spanish claims was achieved for the following forty years. In view of that, the Spanish position seems to have softened, being redirected towards some form of temporary or permanent arrangement to achieve joint sovereignty, which has been proposed by Spain and discussed with the British Government. Such a proposal was put forward by the Spanish Minister for Foreign Affairs, Fernando Morán, in 1985. The details of the proposal were not made public, but information released showed an offer on a treaty with the United Kingdom to "re-integrate" Gibraltar with Spain, while preserving Gibraltarians' way of life. They would keep their British nationality, as well as their existing political and labour rights, self-government and institutions. Morán proposed that a condominium or leaseback arrangement should be agreed, over a 15 or 20-year period. This proposal was not formally rejected by Douglas Hurd, the British Foreign Secretary, until 1993.

In 1997 a second proposal was made by the Spanish Minister for Foreign Affairs, Abel Matutes, foreseeing a hundred-year period of joint sovereignty before a definite transfer to Spain. A similar scheme was provisionally agreed between the Spanish and British governments in the spring of 2002, but this was eventually abandoned, after sustained opposition by the Gibraltarians that included the Gibraltar sovereignty referendum of 2002.

Spain reported to the UN in 2016 that:

- the UK was refusing to negotiate on sovereignty
- the land occupied by the UK was greater than that ceded by the Treaty of Utrecht
- it was the restoration of Spanish territorial integrity that was the key, not self-determination
- the 2006 constitution had not changed the international status of Gibraltar, with the local authorities having no right to interfere in the negotiations about the (according to Spain) illegal occupation of Spanish territory
- Spain would not agree to any situation that was detrimental to people in the area or to the finances of Spain or the EU
- the border checks were EU regulated and designed to stop illegal trafficking of tobacco that was costing the region tax revenue, and that Gibraltar was operating as a tax haven
- Spain was happy to discuss sovereignty issues with the UK and to have four-way ad hoc discussion on local issues

== Resolution discussions ==
Spain insisted that the Gibraltar dispute is a bilateral matter purely between the United Kingdom and Spain. This principle appears to have been reflected in the United Nations resolutions on the decolonisation of Gibraltar in the 1960s, which focused on the "interests" of the Gibraltarians. Speaking to the UN C24 in 2006, the Chief Minister of Gibraltar, Peter Caruana, stated that "It is well known and documented and accepted by all that, since 1988, Gibraltar has rejected the bilateral Brussels Process, and will never be content with it."

With the 2004 return of a centre-left government in Spain, a new Spanish position was adopted and, in December 2005, the governments of the UK, Spain and Gibraltar agreed to set up "a new, trilateral process of dialogue outside the Brussels Process" with equal participation by the three parties, any decisions or agreements to be agreed by all three. This was ratified by the 2006 Cordoba Agreement. After meetings in Malaga (Spain), Faro (Portugal), and Mallorca (Spain), the Spanish foreign minister Miguel Ángel Moratinos went to Gibraltar in July 2009 to discuss a range of mutual issues. This was the first official Spanish visit since Gibraltar was ceded. The issue of sovereignty was not discussed.

From 2010 Spain has claimed that the trilateral dialogue is finished and reverted to the original call for a bilateral agreement with the UK with four way ad hoc meetings which would include Campo de Gibraltar.

== Gibraltar political development ==
The Gibraltarians have sought a more modern status and relationship with the United Kingdom reflecting and expanding the present level of self-government.

A new constitution order was approved in a referendum in 2006, which moved Gibraltar to a more Crown dependency-like relationship with the UK, rather than the previous colonial status. The new constitution came into effect in January 2007. Gibraltar is classified as a British overseas territory.

In a letter to the UN the British representative, Emyr Jones Parry, writes: "The new constitution provides for a modern relationship between Gibraltar and the United Kingdom. I do not think that this description would apply to any relationship based on colonialism."

Chief Minister Peter Caruana addressed the UN Special Committee on Decolonization regarding the new constitution in 2008. He put forth Gibraltar Government's view that "As far as we are concerned, the decolonisation of Gibraltar is no longer a pending issue."

Parallel with this, the Government of Gibraltar has engaged in talks with Spain to resolve other disputes, setting aside the issue of sovereignty.

== Areas of contention ==
=== Isthmus ===
The territory of Gibraltar contains an 800 metres (900 yd) section of the isthmus that links the Rock with Spain. It is argued by Spain that this section of the isthmus was never ceded by Spain; rather, it was gradually occupied de facto by the British.

The growth of Gibraltar onto the southern half of the isthmus began with the construction of two forts in the northernmost part of the ceded territory. In 1815, Gibraltar suffered a yellow fever epidemic. This led to a Spanish concession so a temporary quarantine health camp could be built on the isthmus. After the plague was over, the British did not remove the camp. In 1854, a new epidemic prompted more health camps, which eventually gained Gibraltar these extra 800 metres (½ mile) of land. The occupation of the isthmus culminated in 1938–1939 with the construction of the aerodrome during the Spanish Civil War.

The Treaty of Utrecht did not mention British sovereignty over Gibraltar beyond the fortified perimeter of the town as it was in 1713. However the Treaty ceded the town "together with the port, fortifications, and forts thereunto belonging", which included several forts along the line of the current frontier. The United Kingdom further claims title to the southern half of the isthmus based on continuous possession over a long period.

The territory north of the current border had been occupied by Spain in the 1730s, during the construction of the so-called Spanish Lines or more properly Lines of Contravallation of Gibraltar.

=== Territorial waters ===
Both the United Kingdom and Spain have ratified the United Nations Convention on the Law of the Sea of 1982, which governs countries' oceanic territorial claims. Both countries made statements regarding Gibraltar in their declarations upon ratification of the Convention. The Spanish statement was:

2. In ratifying the Convention, Spain wishes to make it known that this act cannot be construed as recognition of any rights or status regarding the maritime space of Gibraltar that are not included in article 10 of the Treaty of Utrecht of 13 July 1713 concluded between the Crowns of Spain and Great Britain. Furthermore, Spain does not consider that Resolution III of the Third United Nations Conference on the Law of the Sea is applicable to the colony of Gibraltar, which is subject to a process of decolonization in which only relevant resolutions adopted by the United Nations General Assembly are applicable.

The British government responded to the Spanish statement in their own statement:

With regard to point 2 of the declaration made upon ratification of the Convention by the Government of Spain, the Government of the United Kingdom has no doubt about the sovereignty of the United Kingdom over Gibraltar, including its territorial waters. The Government of the United Kingdom, as the administering authority of Gibraltar, has extended the United Kingdom's accession to the Convention and ratification of the Agreement to Gibraltar. The Government of the United Kingdom, therefore, rejects as unfounded point 2 of the Spanish declaration.

However, Articles 309 and 310 of the Convention state that "No reservations or exceptions may be made to this Convention unless expressly permitted by other articles of this Convention", and that if a signatory state makes a declaration upon ratification, that declaration must "not purport to exclude or to modify the legal effect of the provisions of this Convention in their application" to that state.

The dispute over territorial waters, which was rekindled in 2013 following a fishing dispute seems likely to become more important with the discovery of a British treasure ship, HMS Sussex, and the Black Swan Project controversy.

Questions about the waters have previously been asked in the House of Commons, and answered as follows:

Under international law, States are entitled, but not required, to extend their territorial sea up to a maximum breadth of 12 nautical miles. Where the coasts of two States are opposite or adjacent, the general rule is that neither is entitled, unless they agree otherwise, to extend its territorial sea beyond the median line. The UK Government considers that a limit of three nautical miles is sufficient in the case of Gibraltar.

The Government of Gibraltar for its part holds that there is no economic or social need for more than three nautical miles of territorial water, limited to two nautical miles to the west in the Bay of Gibraltar due to the median line between British and Spanish land.

At the end of 2008, the European Commission included most of the territorial waters that surround Gibraltar under a marine conservation area known as the "Estrecho Oriental" that will be maintained by Spain. The UK initiated legal proceedings with the support of Gibraltar, which were initially rejected by the General Court on procedural grounds. A 2011 appeal was dismissed, again on procedural grounds. The European Court of Justice had again ruled against that appeal in 2012.

There have been disputes concerning Spanish patrol boats inside these claimed territorial waters. In May 2009 there was a number of Spanish incursions into British-claimed waters around Gibraltar, including by a Spanish Navy fisheries protection vessel, leading to intervention by police and a diplomatic protest by the UK.

Under the United Nations Convention on the Law of the Sea, vessels passing through the Strait of Gibraltar do so under the regime of transit passage, rather than the more limited innocent passage allowed in most territorial waters.

=== Economy ===
The Spanish government argued that Gibraltar's tax schemes harm the Spanish economy. In January 2005, the European Commissioner for Competition requested the UK (responsible for Gibraltar's external relations) to abolish Gibraltar's tax-exempt company regime by the end of 2010 (at the latest) on the basis that it constitutes illegal state aid that could distort competition.

The Spanish government wanted to increase the exchange of fiscal information to prevent Gibraltar banks being used for tax evasion and money laundering. The British government wanted concrete evidence of wrongdoing to warrant an investigation as Gibraltar has always complied with all international and EU requirements to prevent such activity. In 2009 Gibraltar had signed a number of Tax Information Exchange Agreements (TIEAs), with jurisdictions including the UK, USA and Germany, Gibraltar was listed in the OECD "white list". It is currently listed as "largely compliant" by the OECD's Global Forum on Transparency and Exchange of Information for Tax Purposes.

Gibraltar had not signed a mutual agreement directly with Spain to exchange fiscal information, until in 2019, the International Agreement on Taxation and Protection of Financial Interests between Spain and the United Kingdom on Gibraltar was signed by all three countries. This agreement covers such issues as tax co-operation between the authorities in Gibraltar and Spain, the criteria for tax residence of individuals and companies and procedures for administrative cooperation.

There have been claims that some Gibraltarian motorboats are engaging in drugs and tobacco smuggling. However, since 1996 there has been a law in Gibraltar controlling fast launches licensing their ownership and importation and prohibiting the entry of unlicensed craft into Gibraltar waters. In 2014, inspectors from the EU's fraud office OLAF wrote to the Spanish governments urging an investigation of tobacco smuggling, amid revelations that Gibraltar, with a population of less than 30,000, imported 117 million packets of cigarettes in 2013. In 2015, Spanish authorities broke up a major tobacco smuggling operation, seizing 65,000 packs of cigarettes, five boats, two firearms, communications equipment and €100,000 cash. Authorities estimated the group was smuggling 150,000 packs of contraband tobacco into Spain every week.

=== Military importance ===
Military control of the Strait of Gibraltar has historically been the most important use of Gibraltar, allowing Britain to defend its trade lanes to the East. The British admiral Lord Fisher stated that Gibraltar was one of the five keys that locked the world, together with Dover, Alexandria, Cape of Good Hope and Singapore, all of which have been controlled by Britain at one point.

Its military relevance has reduced with the construction in 1953 of the US Naval Station Rota (the biggest Allied base in the area) and with the end of the Cold War, but it is still an important position as more than one quarter of the global maritime traffic transits through the strait every year. Controlling the strait is of vital importance to NATO. The task of controlling the strait has been traditionally assigned by NATO to the UK, but the recent advances that Spain has made in its armed forces and the bases Spain has in the zone have made NATO reconsider this. However, the tense relations that Spain had with the American administration under George W. Bush and the special friendship of the US with the UK have caused NATO to take a more favourable position towards the UK and Morocco for control of the strait.

== Re-emergence of dispute ==
=== 1953: Rekindling the dispute ===
In May 1954, despite objections by Spain, Queen Elizabeth II visited Gibraltar. Spanish dictator Francisco Franco had renewed claims to The Rock. British National Archives files from 1953 show that Franco claimed that Spain had been promised The Rock in return for staying neutral during the Second World War. The Foreign and Commonwealth Office (FCO) conducted a full review of their files to see whether Franco's claim had any foundation. Said Spanish communiqué did exist; however, a confidential memo called it "a flimsy and unconvincing document", and the Government put an end to the dispute by refusing to comment on the claims.

=== 1967 and 2002 referendums ===
In a 1967 referendum on sovereignty organised by the British Government, 99.6% of voters voted to remain under British sovereignty.

In a second referendum on sovereignty held in November 2002 by the Government of Gibraltar, 187 voted yes (1%) and 17,900 voted no (99%) on the proposal of sharing sovereignty with Spain. The question put was:

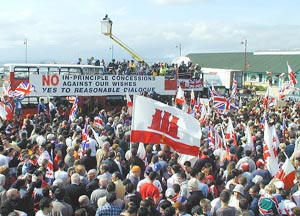
25,000 Gibraltarians demonstrate against joint sovereignty proposals on 18 March 2002

On the 12 July 2002 the Foreign Secretary, Jack Straw, in a formal statement in the House of Commons, said that after twelve months of negotiation the British Government and Spain are in broad agreement on many of the principles that should underpin a lasting settlement of Spain's sovereignty claim, which included the principle that Britain and Spain should share sovereignty over Gibraltar.

Do you approve of the principle that Britain and Spain should share sovereignty over Gibraltar?

Spanish reaction varied from questioning the validity of the process, to observing that no Spanish government has done enough to make joint sovereignty or integration with Spain an attractive prospect.

It is reported that Spanish "secret funds" were used to create a favourable opinion in Gibraltar to the Spanish sovereignty claim. How the money was spent remains uncertain.

=== Spanish restrictions ===
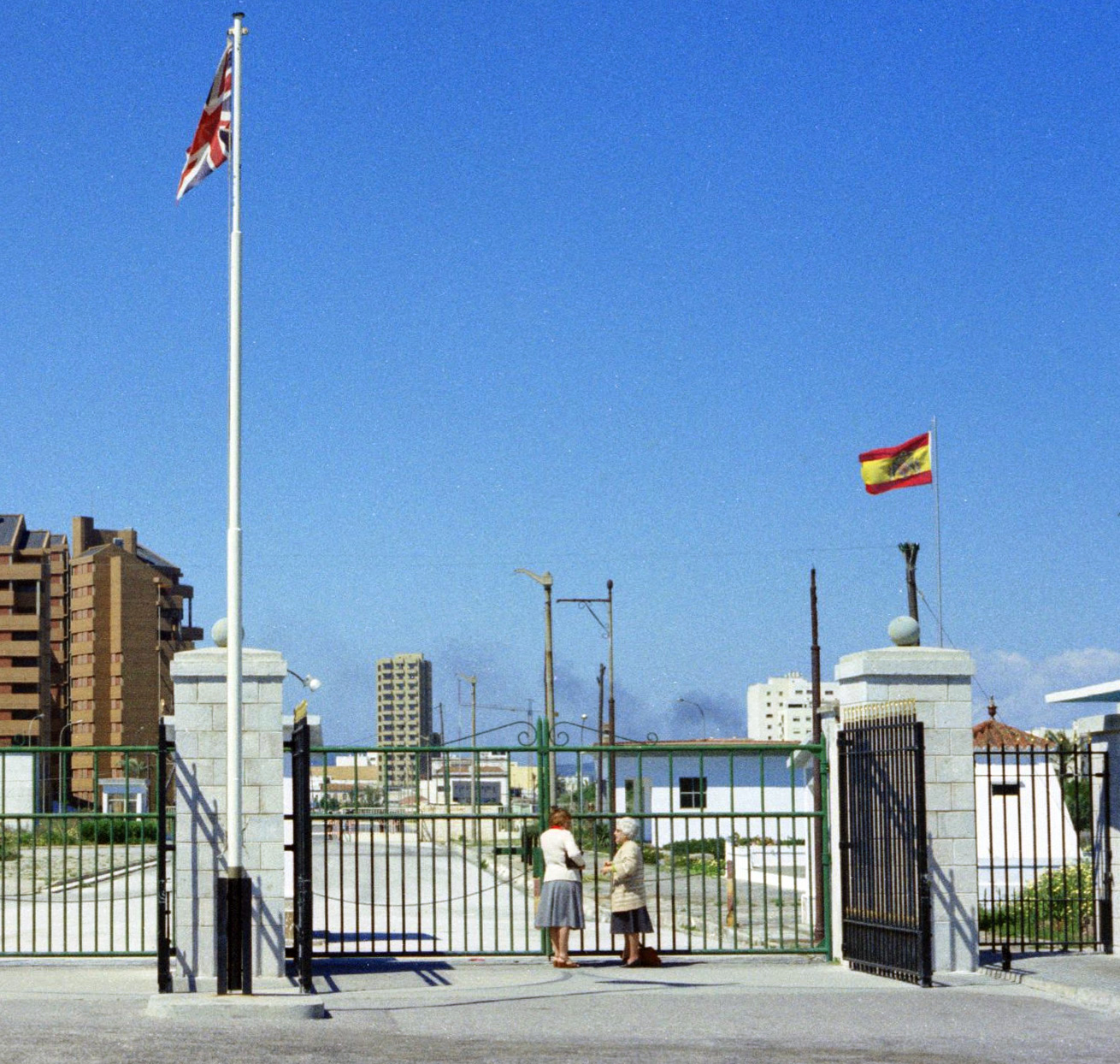
The closed Spanish gate at the border between Gibraltar and Spain, 1977

After the 1978 Spanish constitution became law, Spain was still reluctant to re-open the border because of the consequences it might have. However the border was re-opened in 1984, allowing free access between both sides, although Spain did not open ferry services until later. Further problems have been encountered regarding the airport, as it is placed on disputed neutral land. Under the Lisbon Agreement of 1980:

Both Governments have reached agreement on the re-establishment of direct communications in the region. The Spanish Government has decided to suspend the application of the measures at present in force.

This was to include reinstatement of a ferry service between Gibraltar and Algeciras. This was finally reinstated after 40 years, on 16 December 2009, operated by the Spanish company Transcoma.

At the end of 2006, the restrictions on the airport were removed as a result of the Córdoba Agreement (2006) and direct flights from Madrid by Iberia started operation.

On 22 September 2008, however, Iberia announced that it would cease its flights to Madrid by 28 September due to "economic reasons", namely, lack of demand. This left Gibraltar without any air links with Spain, until May 2009 when Air Andalus opened a service. Air communications with Spain ceased again in August 2010, when Air Andalus lost its licence.

Spain demonstrated opposition to Gibraltar's membership of UEFA, which Gibraltar joined in 2013.

=== Disputes prior to Brexit ===
2000 – An issue of contention was the repair of the nuclear powered submarine, HMS Tireless. The Government of Spain expressed its concern about the effective safety for the inhabitants of Gibraltar and the some 250,000 people living in the Campo de Gibraltar, the adjacent area in Spain.

The inhabitants of the area saw this repair as a precedent of future repair operations in Gibraltar rather than the one-off emergency the British Government has claimed (no other nuclear submarine has been repaired in Gibraltar since). On the other hand, the Government of Gibraltar accused Spain of using this incident as an excuse to justify its 300-year-old sovereignty claim to Gibraltar. Despite many protests, the Government of Gibraltar allowed the work to be done after employing its own experts to confirm it could be undertaken safely. The submarine was in Gibraltar for a year before leaving, during which the repair was completed without incident.

Subsequently, Spanish politicians have complained about every nuclear submarine visit to Gibraltar, and have tried unsuccessfully to get a reassurance that this would totally stop. There have been no further protests against nuclear submarines in Gibraltar. Commenting, the Government of Gibraltar said: "Nuclear submarine visits to Gibraltar are a matter for the UK and Gibraltar. Visits for operational or recreational purposes are welcomed by the Gibraltar Government ... To our knowledge, it is not the position of the present Spanish Government or any previous Spanish Government, that it is opposed to visits by nuclear submarines."

2002 – In the months that predated the referendum called by the Gibraltar government on the joint sovereignty agreement disagreements could be categorised as:

- Control of the military installations. Spain wished to control the military installations of the territory, even in the event of joint sovereignty. This pretension was considered unacceptable by the British Ministry of Defence.
- The referendum itself. Both the Spanish and British governments stated that the referendum had no legal effect, but it clearly indicated the democratically expressed will of the people of Gibraltar to "not be Spanish". As the British Government is committed to respect those wishes, the idea of a joint sovereignty deal has been abandoned.

2004 – A visit by The Princess Royal in June 2004, the brief return of HMS Tireless in July 2004, together with the Tercentenary Celebrations of the capture of The Rock were subjects of complaint by the Spanish Government.

A new round of talks on a tri-lateral basis were proposed in October 2004 to discuss regional co-operation. In February 2005 the first talks took place at a meeting held in Málaga and subsequently in Portugal and London.

This is the first sign of formal recognition of the Government of Gibraltar, and has been generally welcomed. The main issues of the talks have been a new agreement on the airport, the pensions of the Spanish workers that worked in Gibraltar during the 1960s, and the removal of Spanish restrictions on telecommunications.

2006 – Those issues were successfully resolved in September 2006 in the Córdoba Agreement. The process continues.

2007 – A bulk carrier, the MV New Flame, ran aground south of Europa Point in Gibraltar and broke up on the reef in August 2007, generating accusations of pollution in Spain and claims not only against the Government of Gibraltar but also against that of Spain. Its cargo was scrap metal and the vessel's fuel was promptly drained. The Government of Gibraltar claimed in December 2007 that the operation did not represent a material risk to the environment since the vessel had been defuelled and only small, remnant amounts of fuel remained in the engines themselves. The Spanish branch of Greenpeace claimed that, as late as February 2008, fuel spills from the New Flame had polluted Spanish beaches around the Bay of Gibraltar. Official Spanish sources played this down stating that the fuel reaching the beaches of Algeciras was in "insignificant amounts".

2009 – The dispute over British-claimed territorial waters gained prominence with deliberate incursions by Spain, triggering angry headlines in the UK tabloid press. In December 2009, four armed Civil Guard officers were detained after three landed in Gibraltar in pursuit of two suspected smugglers, who were themselves arrested. The Spanish Interior Minister Alfredo Pérez Rubalcaba personally telephoned Chief Minister Peter Caruana to apologise, stating that there were "no political intentions" behind the incident. The Chief Minister was prepared to accept it had not been a political act. The Spanish officers were released by the police the following day, who said that "Enquiries established that the Guardia Civil mistakenly entered Gibraltar Territorial Waters in hot pursuit and have since apologised for their actions."

2012 – Queen Sofía of Spain cancelled plans to travel to the United Kingdom to participate in the Diamond Jubilee of Elizabeth II. The cancellation was a protest in response to a planned visit to Gibraltar by Prince Edward. The Spanish government also lodged a protest to the planned visit by Prince Edward, Earl of Wessex. Relations between Britain and Spain reportedly "returned to a state of growing confrontation" following the election of Spanish prime minister Mariano Rajoy of the People's Party in December 2011. Additional protests followed in August 2012 after Gibraltar abrogated an accord that allowed Spanish fishing boats to operate in its waters.

2013 – Disagreements between Spain and the United Kingdom Government re-surfaced in July 2013, initially after the Gibraltar Government placed a number of concrete blocks in the sea off the coast of Gibraltar, intending to form an artificial reef. The Spanish Government protested however stating that it had a negative impact on fishing in the area, restricting access for Spanish fishing vessels. At the end of July the Spanish Government introduced extra border checks for people going in and out of the territory into Spain. The British Government protested as the checks were causing major delays of up to seven hours while people waited to cross the border, and on 2 August the Spanish Ambassador was summoned to the British Foreign and Commonwealth Office in London to discuss these developments.

On 2 August 2013, Spanish foreign minister José Manuel Garcia-Margallo gave an interview to Spain's ABC newspaper. He announced possible plans to introduce a 50 euro border crossing fee for people going to and from Gibraltar, in response to the creation of the artificial reef. Plans to close Spanish airspace to Gibraltar bound flights were also reported, as were plans for an investigation by Spanish tax authorities into property owned by around 6,000 Gibraltarians in neighbouring parts of Spain. The Spanish foreign minister also mooted plans to changes in the law meaning British online gaming companies based in Gibraltar would have to base servers in Spain, meaning that they would come under Madrid's tax regime.

The British Foreign office responded to these comments: "The prime minister has made clear that the UK government will meet its constitutional commitments to the people of Gibraltar and will not compromise on sovereignty."

=== Effect of Brexit ===
After the United Kingdom voted to leave the European Union, despite a strong vote to remain in Gibraltar, on 23 June 2016, Spain reiterated its position that it wanted to jointly govern Gibraltar with the United Kingdom and said it would seek to block Gibraltar from participating in talks over future deals between the UK and EU. The European council released a series of guidelines on negotiations for withdrawal, with core principal number 22 stating that any agreement affecting Gibraltar needed the agreement of Spain suggesting that Spain had been given a veto while the United Kingdom re-iterated its commitment to Gibraltar.

=== EU Withdrawal Agreement ===
On 18 October 2018, Spanish prime minister Pedro Sánchez announced that he had reached an agreement with Britain, declaring that a special protocol about Gibraltar was being prepared along with the UK Government and was hopeful to reach a good agreement for both parties. However, on 19 November 2018, the Spanish government threatened not to support the Brexit Agreement Draft because they say that an article was added without their consent that could be misunderstood and leave Spain without a say over Gibraltar. On 22 November 2018, PM Sánchez and PM May discussed the problem but the Spanish PM declared that "our positions remain far away. My Government will always defend the interests of Spain. If there are no changes, we will veto Brexit." On 24 November 2018, Spain agreed not to veto the Brexit deal in exchange for a tripartite statement of the European Commission President and the European Council President, the UK Government and the EU Member states saying that no deal would be reached about Gibraltar without Spain's consent. The European statement also declared that the EU does not consider Gibraltar to be part of the United Kingdom.

== See also ==
- Falkland Islands sovereignty dispute between the United Kingdom and Argentina
- Akrotiri and Dhekelia claimed by Cyprus
- Chagos Archipelago sovereignty dispute
- The Spanish enclaves of Ceuta, Melilla, Chafarinas Islands, Peñón de Alhucemas and Peñón de Vélez de la Gomera disputed by Morocco.
- Disputed status of Olivença between Portugal and Spain.
- Spanish exclave of Llívia in France.
- History of Gibraltar
- Gibraltar es español
