= Telecom dispute between Gibraltar and Spain =

Direct telephone connections between Gibraltar and Spain were severed in 1969, when land communications between both territories were halted by the Spanish leader Francisco Franco, and were not restored until 1986. However, Gibraltar experienced restrictions after that date causing problems with its telecommunications system, as a direct result of the Spanish sovereignty claim.

Until 10 February 2007, Spain continued to impose restrictions on Gibraltar's ability to expand and modernise its telecommunications infrastructure. These included a refusal to recognise Gibraltar's International Direct Dialling (IDD) code (+350) which restricted the expansion of the Gibraltar telephone numbering plan, and the prevention of roaming arrangements for Gibraltar GSM mobile phones in Spain and vice versa. Following the signing of the Córdoba Accord between the Governments of Gibraltar, the United Kingdom and Spain in September 2006, these restrictions were removed with effect from 10 February 2007.

== History of the dispute ==
=== International calls to Gibraltar ===
With the introduction of International Direct Dialling in the 1970s, Gibraltar was allocated its own IDD code, +350, by the International Telecommunication Union (ITU), which was accessible from any telephone network outside Spain. However, although physical connectivity existed between Gibraltar and Spain, the Spanish government prohibited its national operators from recognising this code.

When direct dialling from Spain was introduced, Gibraltar was treated as part of the Spanish telephone numbering plan, with callers from Spain having to dial 956 (the area code for the adjacent province of Cádiz) followed by the digit 7, and the subscriber's five digit landline number in Gibraltar, which could only begin with the digits 4, 5 or 7.

Consequently, only 30,000 numbers available in Gibraltar could be dialled directly from Spain. With a population of approximately 28,000, this caused a shortage of new numbers that could be allocated to new telecom operators, thereby preventing deregulation of the industry as required by the European Union.

This also affected international calls from the rest of the world, because carriers using least-cost routing, especially in the United States, routed calls to Gibraltar via Spain, which prevented calls dialled using the +350 code from terminating in Gibraltar. Consequently, the caller would hear a recorded announcement saying that the number dialled did not exist. Even when calls routed via Spain were allowed to terminate in Gibraltar, under the 'sender keeps all' arrangement, Telefónica in Spain was able to keep revenue from these calls, instead of paying Gibtelecom's international termination charges. Although all other countries and territories recognised the +350 dialling code, not all networks blocked calls to Gibraltar from being made using Spain's +34 9567 code, which allowed subscribers to call Gibraltar for the cost of a call to Spain.

Owing to the demand for mobile phones, Gibraltar introduced new number ranges consisting of eight digits, but these could not be dialled directly from Spain. For example, Gibtelecom's pre-paid services consisted of eight digit numbers with the prefix 540, but when using the 9567 prefix from Spain, the last three digits were not recognised, and callers were required to re-enter the eight digit number, during which time they were being charged. However, if the number were dialled from the rest of the world using the +350 code, the call would be terminated in Gibraltar without any problem.

On 16 November 2001, Spain offered to allocate 70,000 numbers to Gibraltar. However, Gibraltar refused the offer, citing that it would mean giving Spain control of its numbering policy.

=== GSM roaming ===
Gibraltar's only GSM operator, Gibtelecom, was prevented from establishing roaming agreements with Spanish operators. As a consequence, once Gibtel GSM customers crossed into Spain and moved outside the area of coverage of their own base stations, they were unable to use their phones until they entered another Member State of the European Union or were within range of base stations in Morocco.

=== Resolution ===
Under the September 2006 accord in Córdoba between Gibraltar, Spain and the UK, a timetable was agreed to remove these restrictions. Spain recognised Gibraltar's international dialling code, thereby allowing Gibraltar to expand its telephone numbering plan, and allow Spanish mobile phone operators to enter into roaming arrangements with Gibtelecom. These measures came into force on 10 February 2007.

Following the removal of Spanish restrictions in 2007, all mobile telephone numbers in Gibraltar can be dialled in full from Spain, using the +350 international code. The Spanish numbering space allocated to Gibraltar has now been withdrawn from use, and will now only be used for numbers in Spain.

== See also ==
- Disputed status of Gibraltar
