= Gibraltar Regulatory Authority =

Regulatory body in Gibraltar

- Abbreviation: GRA
- Formation: October 2000
- Type: Statutory body
- Purpose: Regulating electronic communications, data protection (and previously gambling)
- Location: Gibraltar
- Website: www.gra.gi

The Gibraltar Regulatory Authority (GRA) was established by the Gibraltar Regulatory Act in October 2000. The GRA is the statutory body in Gibraltar responsible for regulating electronic communications. This includes telecommunications, radio communications and broadcasting transmissions. The GRA serves as both the national supervisory and regulatory authority for these sectors. The supervision and regulation of these sectors is done in accordance with European Union law that has been rendered into national law.

Since inception the GRA has seen its responsibilities extended to data protection and, for a time, gambling.

== Electronic Communication ==
The GRA attempts to enhance competition in the communications sector by regulating network access to develop effective choice for business and residential consumers alike and by helping the facilitate entry to the communications market through authorisations and licences.

The GRA policy is designed to make Gibraltar recognizable as a world-class telecommunications centre to do business. As well as ensuring that Gibraltar has a high quality telecommunications service that offers consumers high performance and standards, as well as competitive prices.

The communications remit of the GRA includes traditional telephone wire, dial up and ADSL internet, mobile operators providing voice and data services, voice over internet protocol services, television and radio, radio communications including fixed wireless services, and licensing frameworks for satellite services.

== Data Protection ==
The Gibraltar Government nominated the GRA as the supervisory authority for the enforcement of the Data Protection Act 2004. With the powers imbued upon the Data Protection Commissioner, the GRA has made assurances that a system is in place to monitor the executory function of the Data Protection Act. The GRA works closely with foreign regulatory authorities tasked with a similar role. The GRA also continuously develops a comprehensive online guide that is designed to encompass the wealth of information available about Data Protection.
