= Cordoba Agreement, 2006 =

The Córdoba Agreement (Spanish: Acuerdo de Córdoba) was an agreement between the governments of Spain, the United Kingdom and Gibraltar to establish a tripartite forum for co-operation on Gibraltar. It was signed by Spanish Foreign Minister Miguel Ángel Moratinos, UK Minister for Europe Geoff Hoon and Gibraltar's Chief Minister Peter Caruana in Córdoba, Spain.

== Background ==
The agreement, signed in 2006, was the result of nearly two years of talks between the three governments, giving a voice to Gibraltar in talks between Britain and Spain for the first time. The agreement stemmed from an initiative by the incoming Spanish Socialist Workers' Party government in 2004, which proposed a Forum of Dialogue, in which for the first time Gibraltar would take part as an independent third party.

== Key agreements ==
The key agreements were:

- Aviation: Flights between Spain and Gibraltar
- Telecommunications: Spanish recognition of Gibraltar's +350 international dialling code, lifting of restrictions on the number of telephone numbers in Gibraltar that could be called from Spain and mobile roaming in Spain for Gibraltar mobile phones
- Dispute over pension payments to Spaniards who once worked in Gibraltar resolved
- Spain promised to reduce its border controls and ease movement across the frontier.

The agreement established the Tripartite Forum, providing for regular dialogue between the three parties. In July 2009, the Spanish foreign minister Miguel Ángel Moratinos attended talks in Gibraltar, the first Spanish minister to ever make an official visit to the British Overseas Territory. The agreement has not been without criticism. In Spain it has been reported as "a shameful moment in Spain's history" and in Gibraltar talks were criticised due to Moratinos' role in the controversy of British Gibraltar Territorial Waters. The forum was designed to facilitate dialogue on a number of issues, putting the sovereignty issue to one side.

An independent appraisal by Peter Gold concluded that "given the fundamental differences in the ultimate objectives of the Forum participants and in particular Spain's sensitivity to Gibraltar's status, the agreements may only prove to be a means of managing the Gibraltar 'problem' rather than resolving it." Spain has continued to insist it will only discuss sovereignty with the United Kingdom and not as part of the Tripartite Forum.

== See also ==
- Gibraltar Constitution Order 1969
- Lisbon Agreement, 1980
- Brussels Agreement, 1984
- 2002 Gibraltar sovereignty referendum
- Gibraltar Constitution Order 2006
