= Lisbon Agreement (1980) =

1980 British-Spanish Gibraltar relations

The Lisbon Agreement was the first of a series of agreements between the British and Spanish governments intended to resolve their differences concerning Gibraltar.

== Background ==
The 1969 Gibraltarian constitutional order made it clear that the British would not impose a solution on the Gibraltarians and acknowledged their right to self-determination in their political future. Francisco Franco continued to insist that Gibraltar was territorially integral to Spain and, "in a fit of diplomatic pique", ordered the closure of the border in 1969. For the next 16 years, Gibraltar was reliant on an airlink with Britain for formal access to the outside world.

The closure of the border hardened Gibraltar's attitudes towards Franco and Spain more generally.

It is also ironic that the actions taken by Francisco Franco and Spain completely destroyed any potential for winning over the population and gaining support in either Britain or Gibraltar for transfer of sovereignty to Spain.... This natural tendency of the two populations to interact demonstrated the artificial division that had been created and continued to exist so long as Britain retained possession of Gibraltar. Instead, he demanded the immediate return of Gibraltar, initiated a newspaper campaign in which the entire population was characterised as criminals and individuals of dubious moral character, and imposed border restrictions that caused real hardship on the inhabitants.

== Diplomatic stalemate ==
A diplomatic stalemate persisted until after the death of Franco, when Margaret Thatcher's government initiated a political process that resulted in the Lisbon Agreement. It was a joint statement by the Spanish Foreign Minister, Marcelino Oreja, and the British Foreign Secretary Lord Carrington signed in Lisbon on 10 April 1980. Its preamble stated:

The British and Spanish governments, desiring to strengthen their bilateral relations and thus to contribute to Western solidarity, intend, in accordance with the relevant United Nations Resolutions, to resolve, in a spirit of friendship, the Gibraltar problem.

== See also ==
- Gibraltar Constitution Order 1969 – Order defining the constitution of Gibraltar
- Brussels Agreement, 1984 – 1984 trealty between Britain and Spain on the status of Gibraltar
- 2002 Gibraltar sovereignty referendum
- Gibraltar Constitution Order 2006 – 2006 referendum in Gibraltar
- Cordoba Agreement, 2006
