= Outline of Gibraltar =

British Overseas Territory at the mouth of the Mediterranean

The Flag of Gibraltar

The Coat of arms of Gibraltar

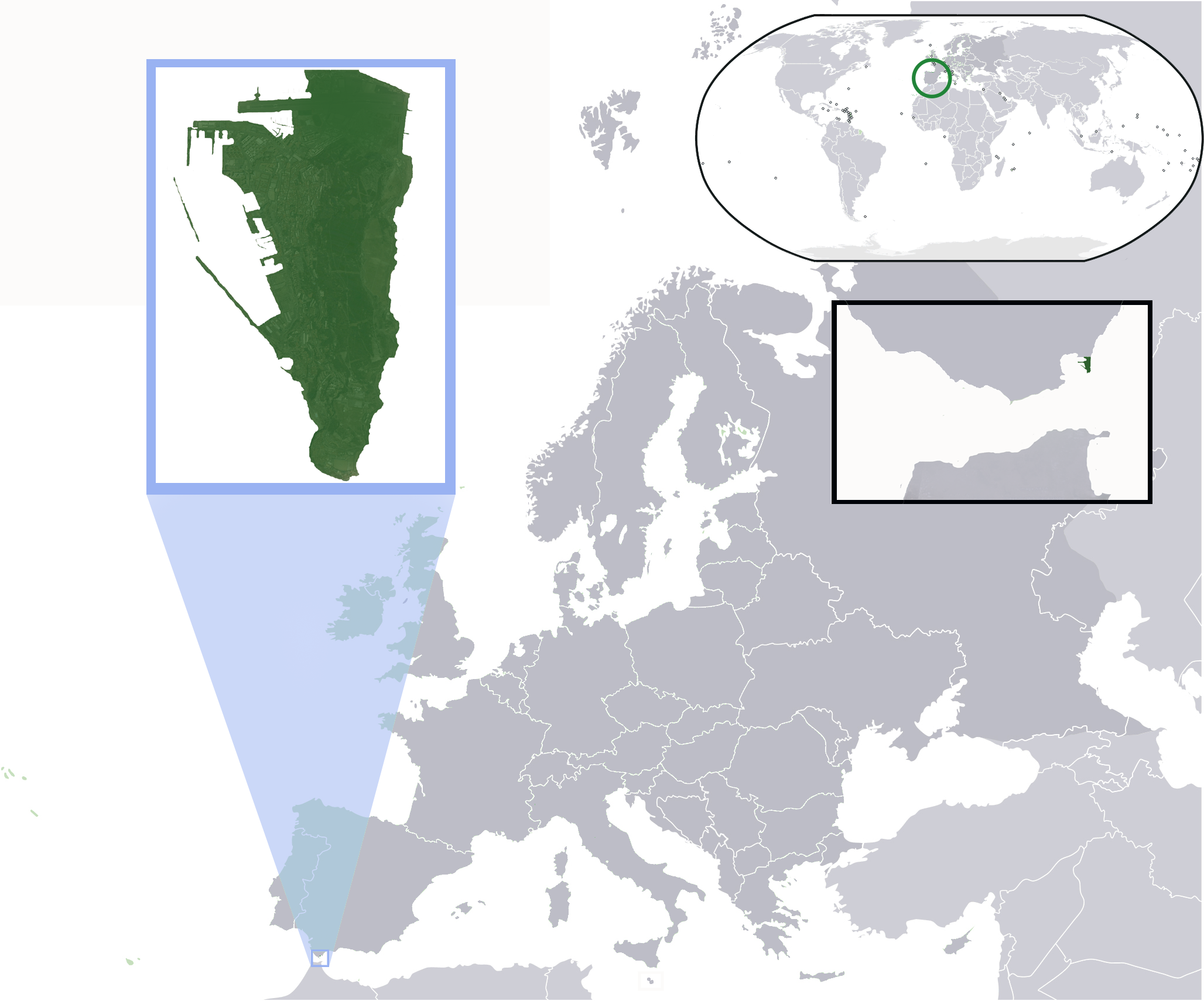
The location of Gibraltar within Europe

A detailed map of Gibraltar

The following outline is provided as an overview of and topical guide to Gibraltar:

Gibraltar – British Overseas Territory located near the southernmost tip of the Iberian Peninsula of Southeastern Europe overlooking the Strait of Gibraltar between the Mediterranean Sea and the North Atlantic Ocean. The territory shares a border with Spain to the north. Gibraltar was ceded by Spain to Great Britain in perpetuity in 1713 under the Treaty of Utrecht though Spain requests its return. The Government of the United Kingdom has stated it is committed to respecting the wishes of the Gibraltarians, who strongly oppose the idea of annexation along with any proposal for shared sovereignty with Spain.

== General reference ==
- Pronunciation: /dʒɪˈbrɔːltər/ jib-RAWL-tər, Spanish: [xiβɾalˈtaɾ]
- Common English country name: Gibraltar
- Official English country name: Gibraltar
- Common endonym(s): List of countries and capitals in native languages None
- Official endonym(s): List of official endonyms of present-day nations and states None
- Adjectival(s): Gibraltar
- Official demonym(s): Gibraltarians
- Unofficial demonym(s): Llanitos
- Etymology: Etymology of Gibraltar
- ISO country codes: GI, GIB, 292
- ISO region codes: See ISO 3166-2:GI
- Internet country code top-level domain: .gi
- International dialing Code: 350

== Geography of Gibraltar ==
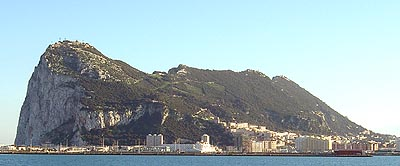
View of the western face of the Rock of Gibraltar.

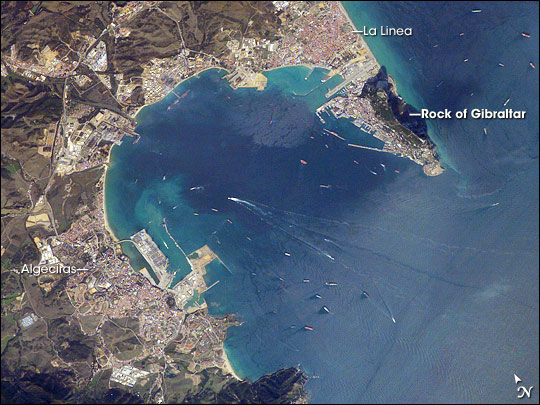
An enlargeable satellite image of the Bay of Gibraltar

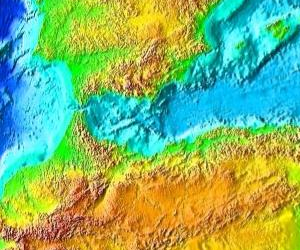
Topographic/hydrographic map of the Strait of Gibraltar

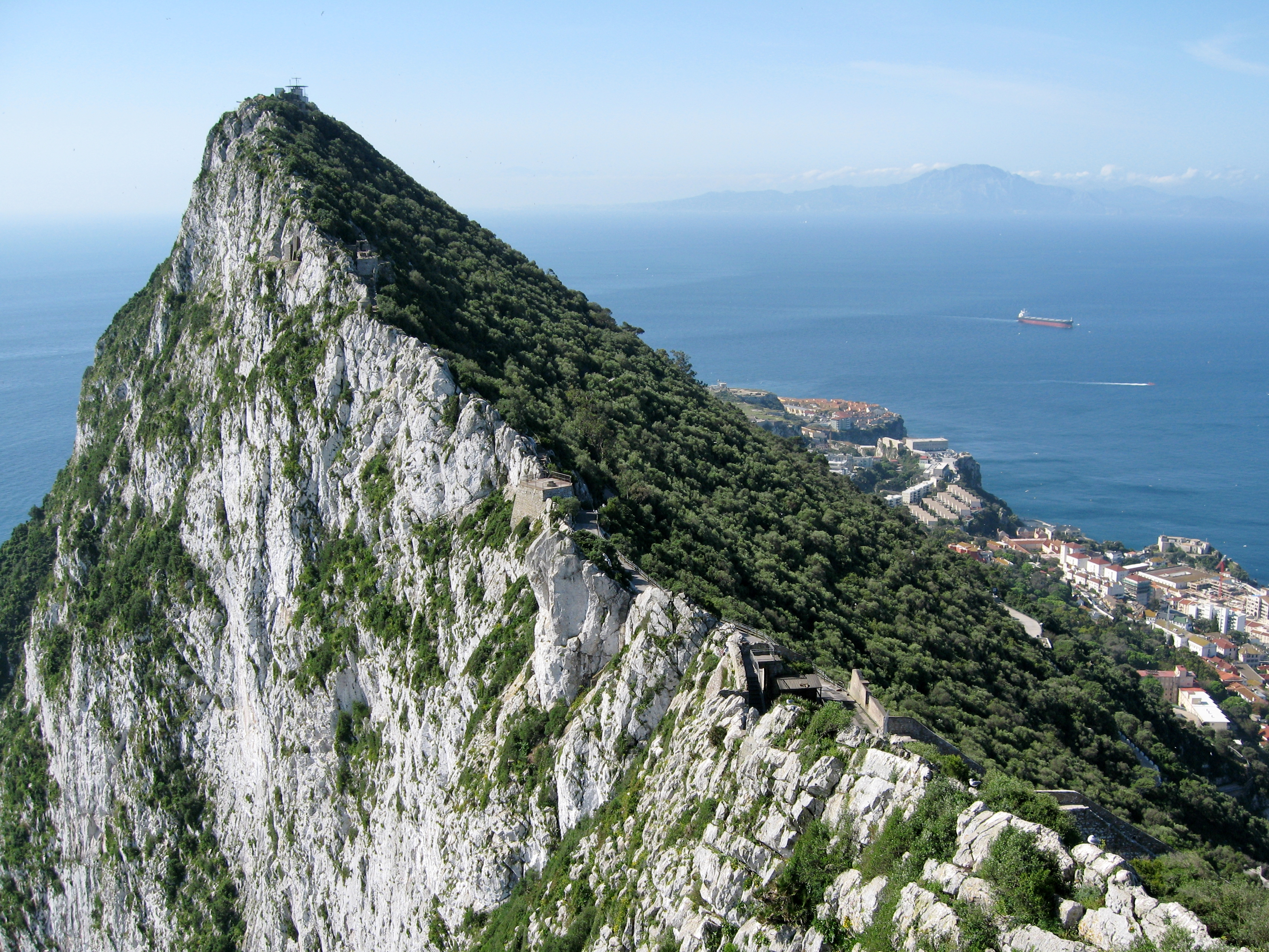
View of North Africa across the Strait of Gibraltar as seen from The Rock.

Geography of Gibraltar

- Gibraltar is: a British Overseas Territory
- Land boundaries: Spain 1.2 kilometres (0.75 mi)
- Coastline: Mediterranean Sea 12 kilometres (7.5 mi)
- Population of Gibraltar: 28,875
- Area of Gibraltar: 6.843 square kilometres (2.642 sq mi)
- Atlas of Gibraltar

=== Location of Gibraltar ===
- Gibraltar is situated within the following regions:
  - Northern Hemisphere and Western Hemisphere
  - Eurasia
    - Europe
      - Southern Europe
        - Iberian Peninsula - near its southernmost tip, overlooking the Strait of Gibraltar
  - Time zone: Central European Time (UTC+01), Central European Summer Time (UTC+02)
- Extreme points of Gibraltar
  - High: Rock of Gibraltar 426 m (1,398 ft)
  - Low: Strait of Gibraltar 0 m

=== Environment of Gibraltar ===
- Climate of Gibraltar
  - Water supply and sanitation in Gibraltar
- Geology of Gibraltar
  - Azores–Gibraltar Transform Fault
- Protected areas of Gibraltar
  - Gibraltar Botanic Gardens
- Wildlife of Gibraltar
  - Flora of Gibraltar
  - Fauna of Gibraltar
    - Birds of Gibraltar
    - Mammals of Gibraltar
    - Reptiles and amphibians of Gibraltar

==== Natural geographic features of Gibraltar ====
- Rock of Gibraltar – one of the two Pillars of Hercules
- Bay of Gibraltar
- Sand Dune
- Strait of Gibraltar
- World Heritage Sites in Gibraltar: None, though the entire peninsula was once a proposed World Heritage Site In May 2012, the Gorham's Cave complex (including Vanguard Cave) made the United Kingdom's short list of sites that have been forwarded for submission to UNESCO.

=== Regions of Gibraltar ===
- Westside

=== Demography of Gibraltar ===
Demographics of Gibraltar

- Gibraltarians

== Government and politics of Gibraltar ==
The coat of arms of the Government of Gibraltar combines that of the Government of the United Kingdom and Gibraltar's own coat of arms

- Form of government: parliamentary representative democratic British Overseas Territory
- Capital of Gibraltar: Gibraltar
- Elections in Gibraltar
  - 1950 Gibraltar general election
  - 1953 Gibraltar general election
  - 1956 Gibraltar general election
  - 1959 Gibraltar general election
  - 1964 Gibraltar general election
  - 1969 Gibraltar general election
  - 1972 Gibraltar general election
  - 1976 Gibraltar general election
  - 1980 Gibraltar general election
  - 1984 Gibraltar general election
  - 1988 Gibraltar general election
  - 1992 Gibraltar general election
  - 1996 Gibraltar general election
  - 2000 Gibraltar general election
  - 2003 Gibraltar general election
  - 2007 Gibraltar general election
  - 2011 Gibraltar general election
  - 2015 Gibraltar general election
  - 2019 Gibraltar general election
  - 2023 Gibraltar general election
  - Next Gibraltar general election
- Referendums in Gibraltar
  - 1967 Gibraltar sovereignty referendum
  - 2002 Gibraltar sovereignty referendum
  - 2016 United Kingdom European Union membership referendum
- Political parties in Gibraltar
  - Gibraltar Social Democrats
  - Gibraltar Socialist Labour Party
  - Liberal Party of Gibraltar
  - Progressive Democratic Party
- Postal orders of Gibraltar
- Vehicle registration plates of Gibraltar

=== Executive branch of the government of Gibraltar ===
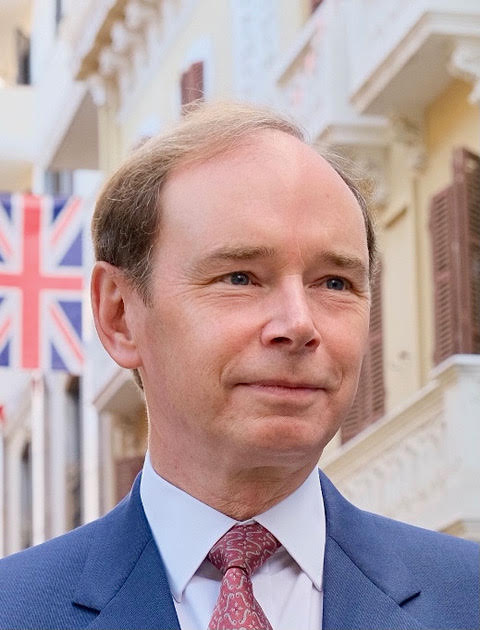
Governor, Sir David Steel

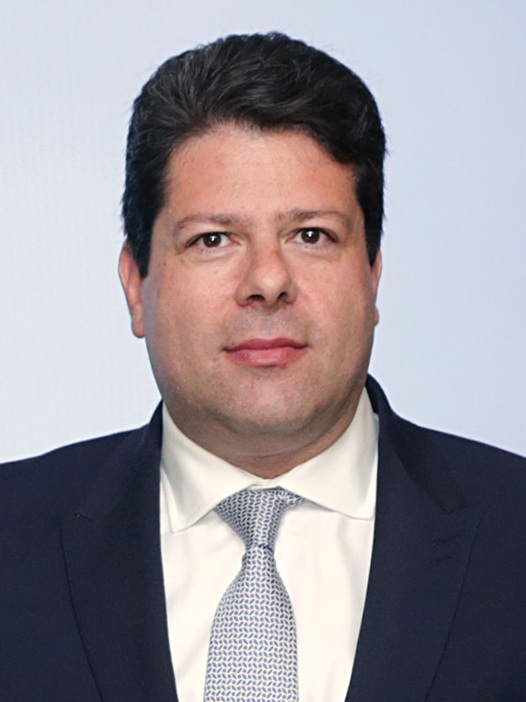
Chief Minister, Fabian Picardo

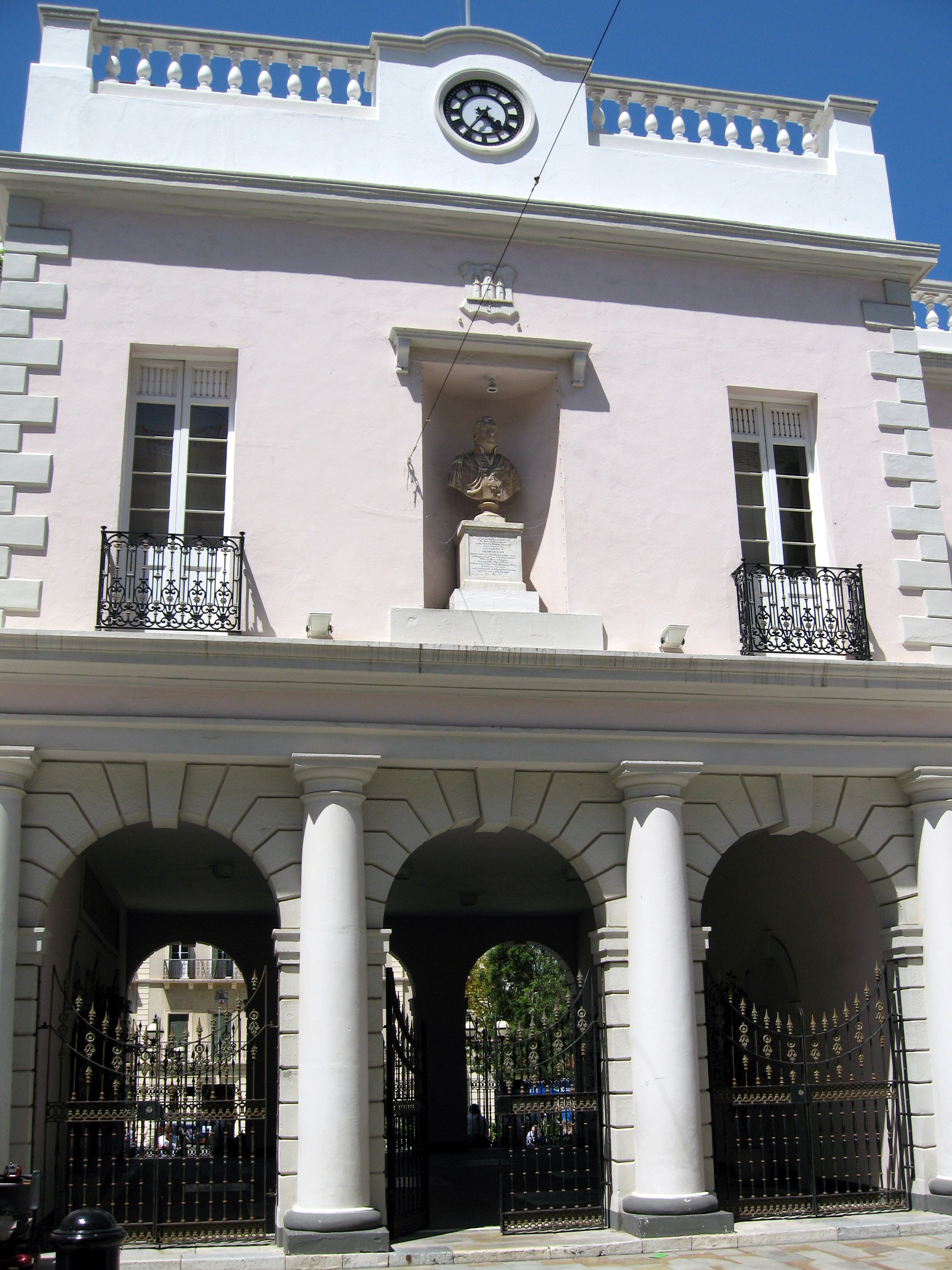
Entrance to the Gibraltar Parliament

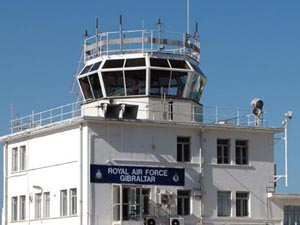
The airport control tower at RAF Gibraltar

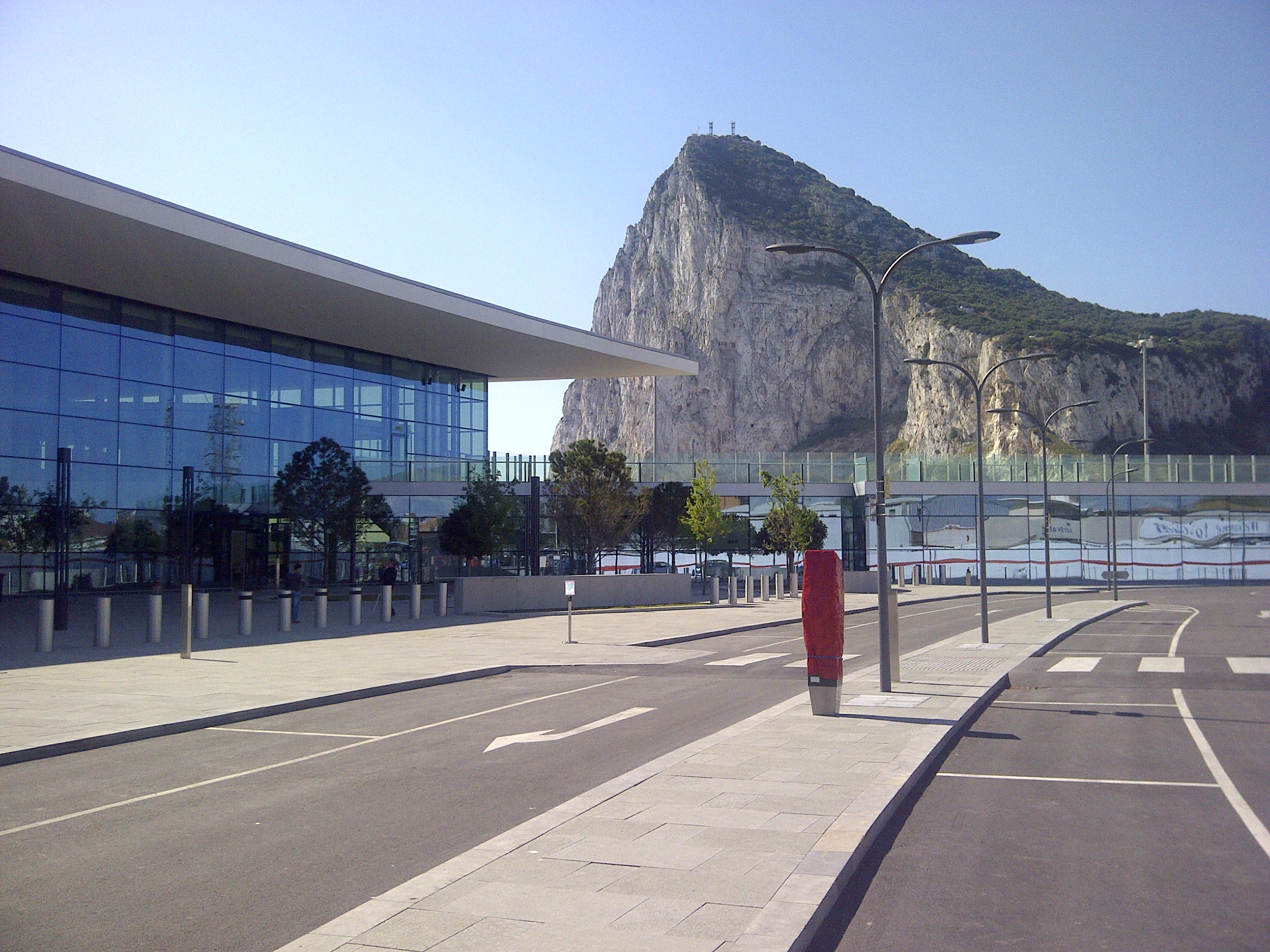
New Terminal at Gibraltar International Airport.

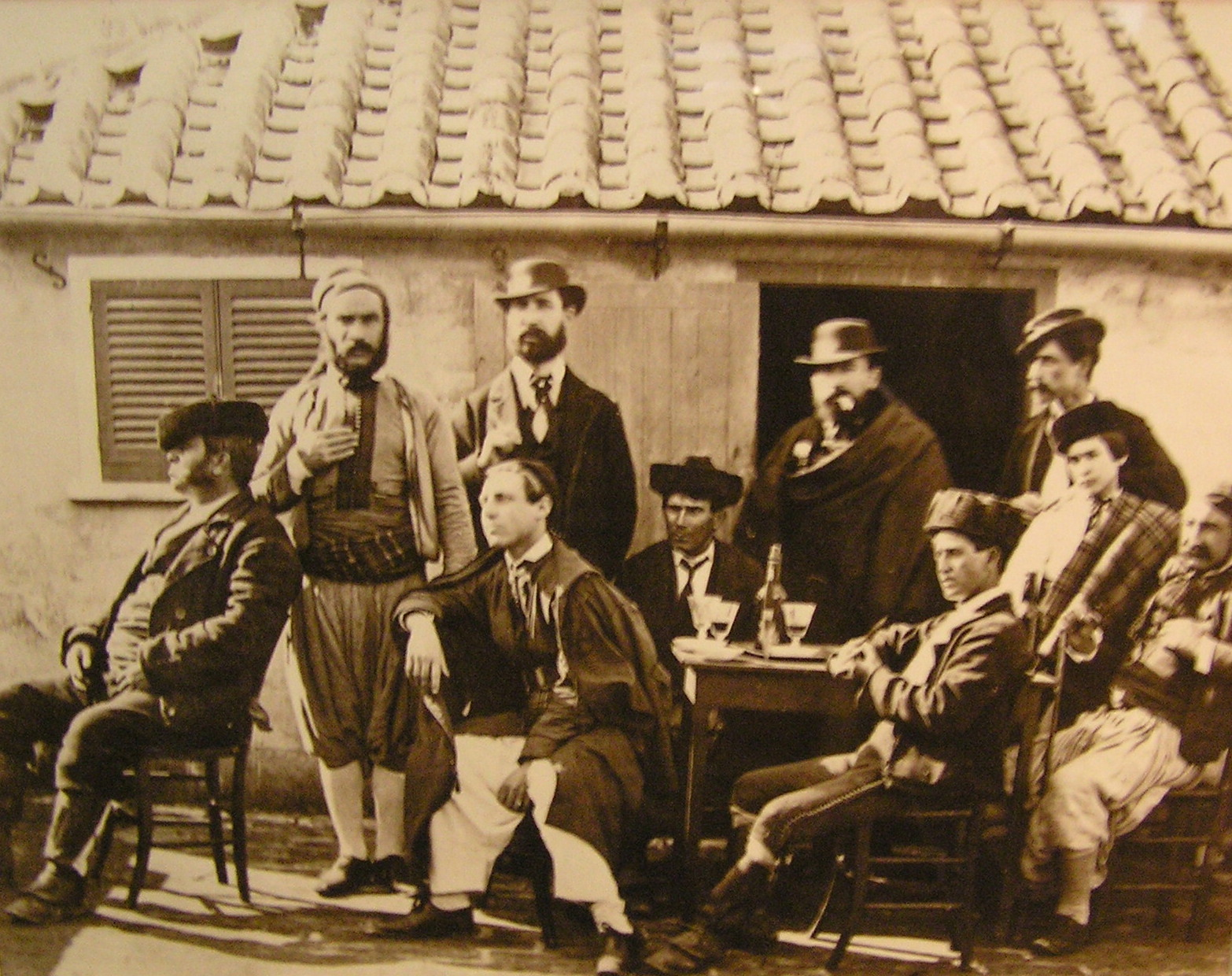
Gibraltarians, 1856.

- Head of state: Monarch, King Charles III
- Governor: Governor of Gibraltar, Sir David Steel
- Head of government: Chief Minister of Gibraltar, Fabian Picardo

=== Legislative branch of the government of Gibraltar ===
- Gibraltar Parliament (unicameral)
  - Leader of the Opposition: Keith Azopardi

=== Judicial branch of the government of Gibraltar ===
Court system of Gibraltar

=== Foreign relations of Gibraltar ===
- Disputed status of Gibraltar
  - Sovereignty referendum, 1967
  - Sovereignty referendum, 2002
  - Conservative Friends of Gibraltar
- Disputed status of the isthmus
- Spain–United Kingdom relations
- Foreign and Commonwealth Office

==== International organisation membership ====
Gibraltar is a member of:

- International Criminal Police Organization (Interpol) (subbureau)
- European Association of Airport and Seaport Police
- Universal Postal Union (UPU)
- The International Amateur Radio Union (IARU)

In addition, Gibraltar is a member of a large number of International Sporting organisations.

=== Law and order in Gibraltar ===
Law of Gibraltar

- Constitution of Gibraltar
  - Constitution Order 1969
  - Constitution Order 2006
- Human rights in Gibraltar
  - LGBT rights in Gibraltar
- Law enforcement in Gibraltar
  - Gibraltar Defence Police
  - Royal Gibraltar Police
- Gibraltar passport

=== Military of Gibraltar ===
Military of Gibraltar

- Command
  - Commander-in-chief: Governor of Gibraltar
    - British Forces Gibraltar
- British Forces Gibraltar
  - Army of Gibraltar
- Royal Gibraltar Regiment - the territory's permanently based light infantry battalion, consisting of both regular and reserve elements.
- Joint Provost and Security Unit
- Royal Navy Gibraltar Squadron - two Scimitar class patrol boats, HMS Scimitar and HMS Sabre, and three rigid hulled inflatable boats.
- RAF Gibraltar - Gibraltar's military airfield has no resident units, but is utilised as and when required by aircraft on deployment or exercise.
- Gibraltar Defence Police - a civilian police force responsible for enforcing civil law on MoD property in Gibraltar, and is responsible to Commander, British Forces Gibraltar.
- Military history of Gibraltar during World War II

== History of Gibraltar ==
- Ethnic history of Gibraltar
  - History of the Jews in Gibraltar
  - History of the Maltese in Gibraltar
- Kingdom of Gibraltar
- Military history of Gibraltar
  - Battle of Gibraltar
  - Siege of Gibraltar (1727)
  - Great Siege of Gibraltar
  - Military history of Gibraltar during World War II
- History of Nationality

== Culture of Gibraltar ==
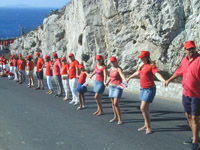
Gibraltarians encircle The Rock during the tercentenary of British Gibraltar, 4 August 2004.

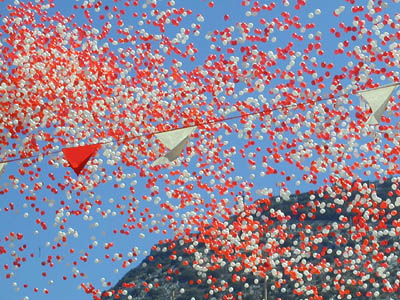
The symbolic release of 30,000 red and white balloons on National Day, one for every person living on The Rock.

Culture of Gibraltar

- Architecture of Gibraltar
- Cuisine of Gibraltar
- Languages of Gibraltar
- Communications in Gibraltar
  - Internet in Gibraltar
- National symbols of Gibraltar
  - Coat of arms of Gibraltar
  - Flag of Gibraltar
  - National anthem of Gibraltar
- People of Gibraltar
- Public holidays in Gibraltar
  - Gibraltar National Day
- Scouting and Guiding in Gibraltar
- World Heritage Sites in Gibraltar: None, though the entire peninsula is a proposed World Heritage Site

=== Art in Gibraltar ===
- Art in Gibraltar
  - The Defeat of the Floating Batteries at Gibraltar, September 1782
  - The Sortie Made by the Garrison of Gibraltar, 1789
- Music of Gibraltar
- Television in Gibraltar

=== Religion in Gibraltar ===
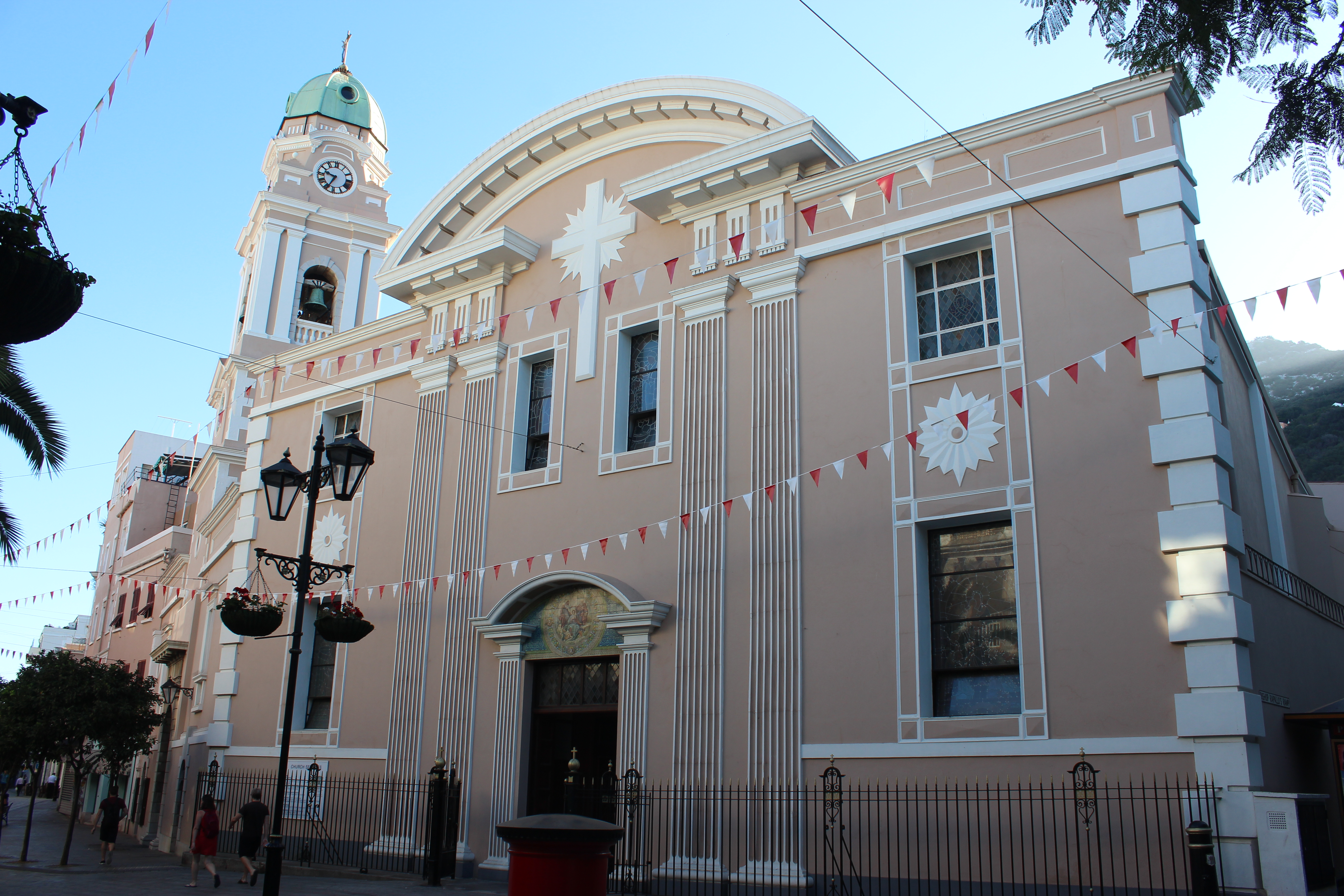
Roman Catholic Cathedral of St. Mary the Crowned in Main Street

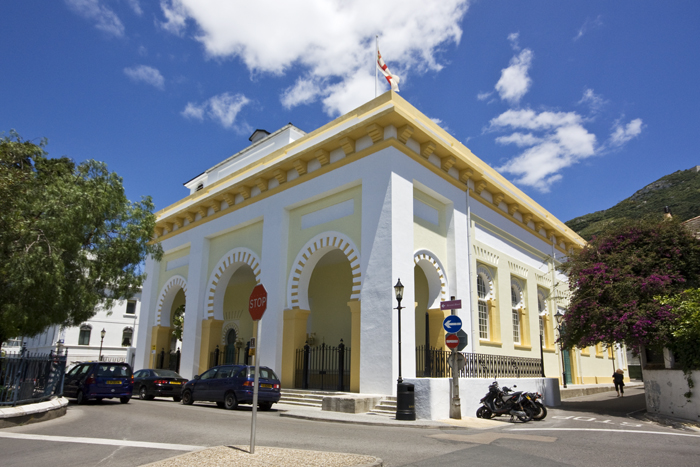
The Anglican Cathedral of the Holy Trinity in Cathedral Square.

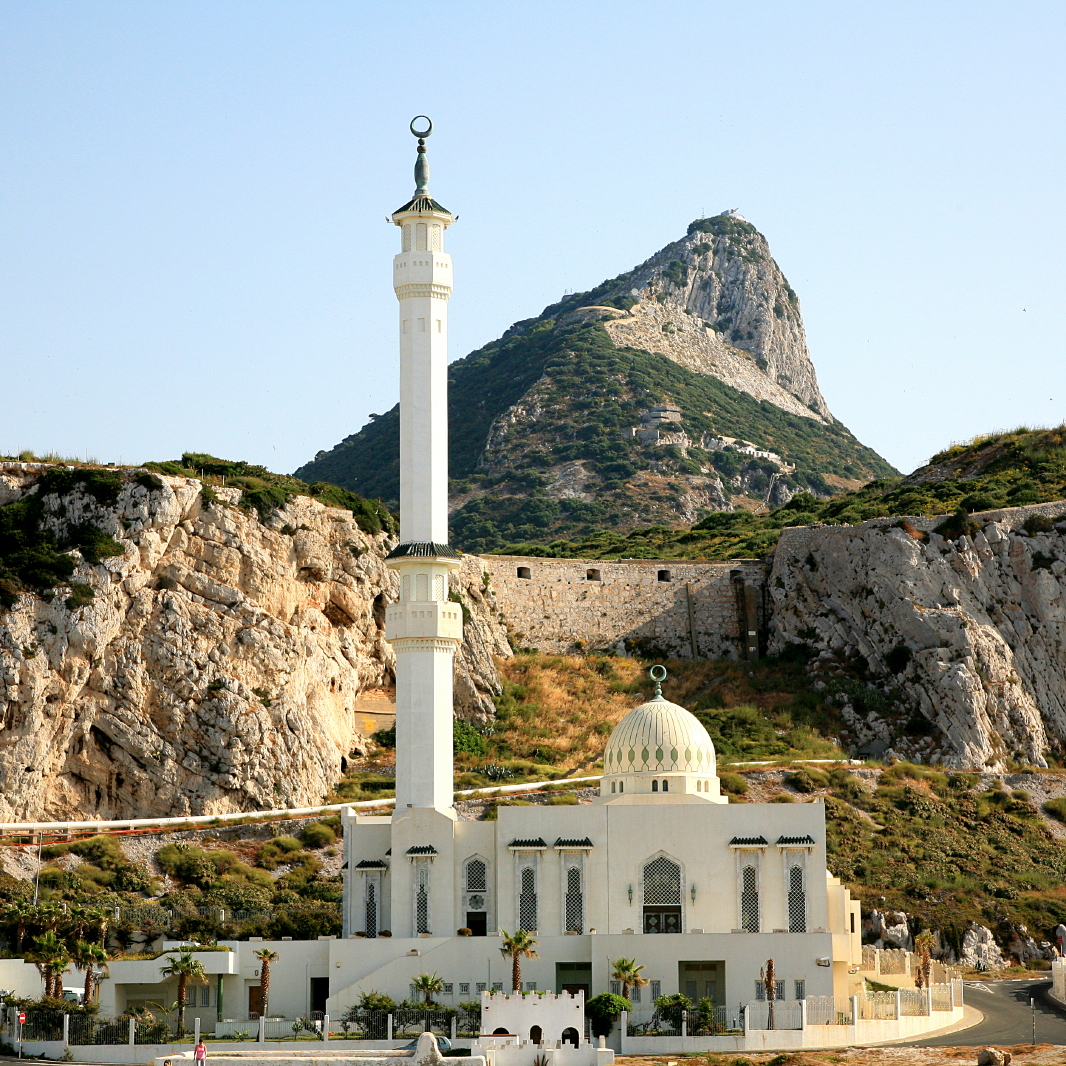
Ibrahim-al-Ibrahim Mosque at Europa Point

- Christianity in Gibraltar
  - Church of England
    - Diocese of Gibraltar in Europe
      - Bishop of Gibraltar in Europe
      - Cathedral of the Holy Trinity, Gibraltar
  - Gibraltar Methodist Church
  - Catholic Church in Gibraltar
    - Roman Catholic Diocese of Gibraltar
      - Roman Catholic Bishop of Gibraltar
      - Cathedral of St. Mary the Crowned
- Hinduism in Gibraltar
- Islam in Gibraltar
- Judaism in Gibraltar

=== Sport in Gibraltar ===
Sport in Gibraltar

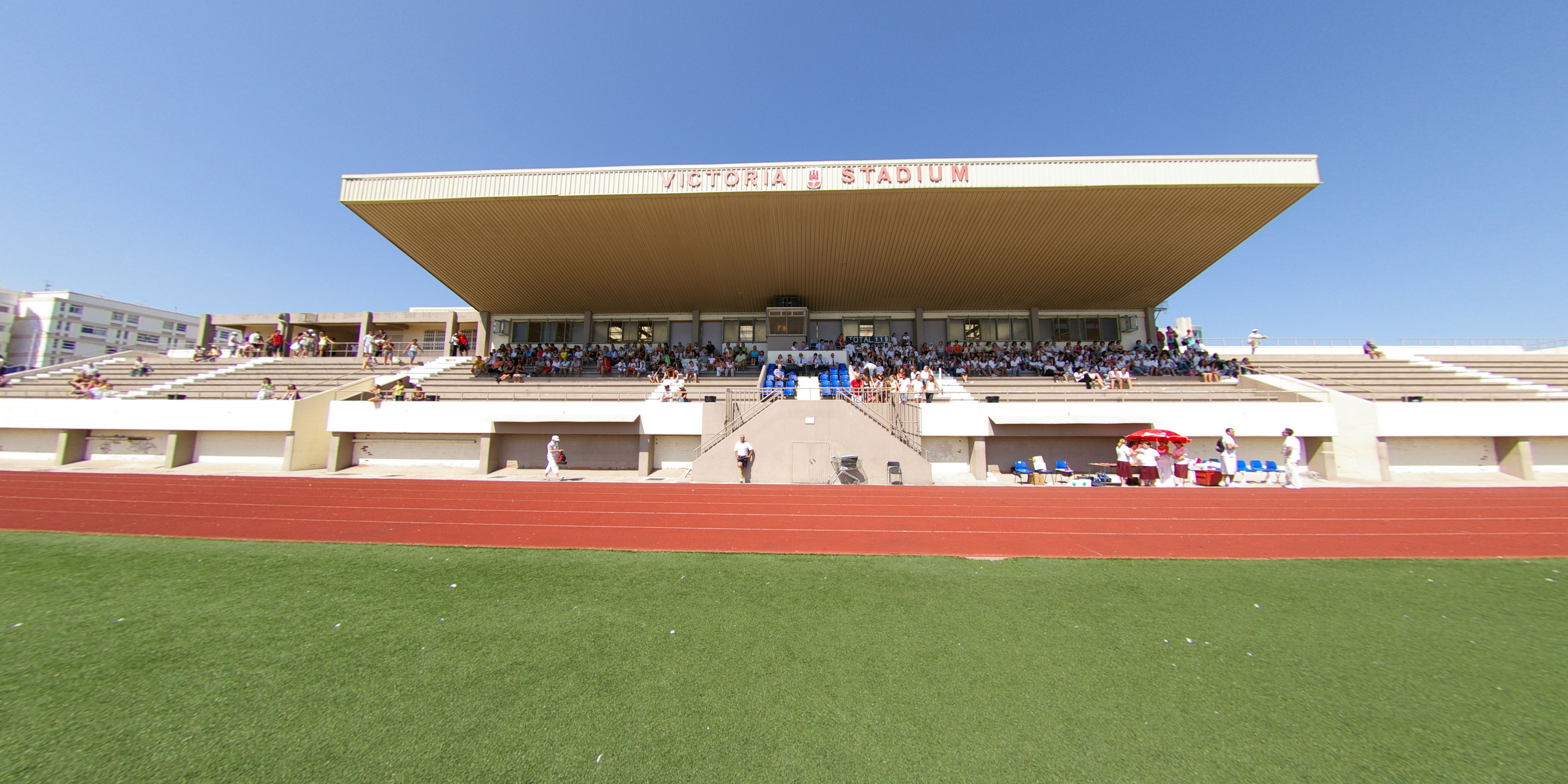
View of the Victoria Stadium's western stands.

- Gibraltar at the Commonwealth Games
- Gibraltar Cricket Association
  - Gibraltar national cricket team
- Football in Gibraltar
  - Gibraltar Football Association
    - Gibraltar Football League
      - Football clubs in Gibraltar
  - Gibraltar national football team
    - Gibraltar national football team records and statistics
    - Gibraltar national football team results
  - Football venues in Gibraltar
    - Victoria Stadium
- Gibraltar at the Olympics: application denied
- Rugby union in Gibraltar

== Economy and infrastructure of Gibraltar ==
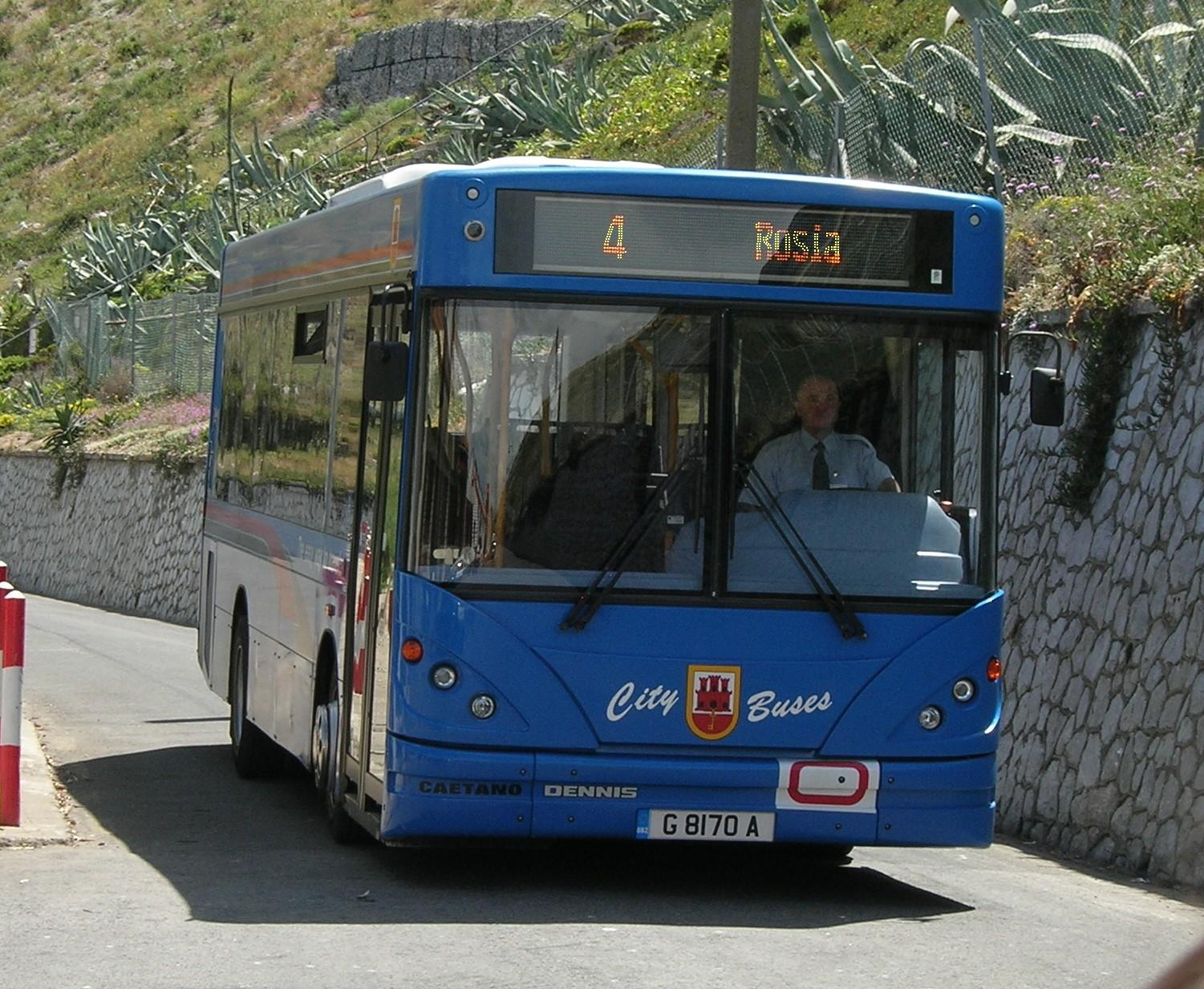
Gibraltar bus on route 4 near the "Both Worlds" terminus, Sandy Bay

Economy of Gibraltar

- Economic rank, by nominal GDP (2007): 164th (one hundred and sixty fourth)
- Banking in Gibraltar
  - Banks in Gibraltar
- Communications in Gibraltar
  - Internet in Gibraltar
  - Internet in Gibraltar
  - Media in Gibraltar
    - Gibraltar Broadcasting Corporation
    - Newspapers in Gibraltar
      - Gibraltar Chronicle
      - Panorama
  - Telephone numbers in Gibraltar
  - Royal Gibraltar Post Office
- Currency of Gibraltar: Pound
  - Coins of the Gibraltar pound
  - ISO 4217: GIP
- Gibraltar Stock Exchange
- Health care in Gibraltar
  - Gibraltar Health Authority
- Shipping in Gibraltar
- Tourism in Gibraltar
  - Footpaths of Gibraltar
  - Visa policy of Gibraltar
- Transport in Gibraltar
  - Airports in Gibraltar: Gibraltar International Airport is Gibraltar's only airport
  - Bus routes in Gibraltar
  - Rail transport in Gibraltar
  - Roads in Gibraltar
  - Streets in Gibraltar
- Water supply and sanitation in Gibraltar

== Education in Gibraltar ==
- List of schools in Gibraltar

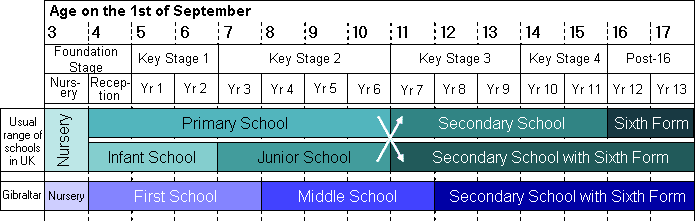
Comparison of school structures in Gibraltar and England.

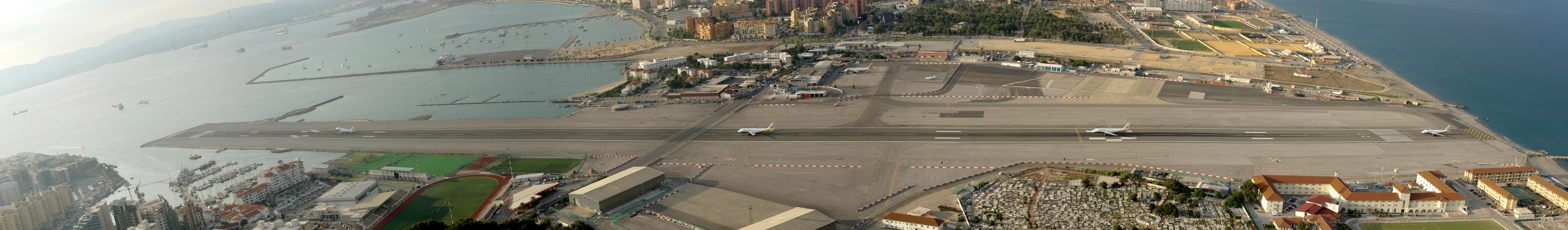
Panoramic photograph of Gibraltar Airport.

== Lists ==
- Gibraltar in popular culture
- List of coats of arms of Gibraltar
- List of flags of Gibraltar
- List of fortifications in Gibraltar
- List of schools in Gibraltar

== See also ==
- List of international rankings
- Outline of Europe
- Outline of geography
- Outline of the United Kingdom
