= Gibraltar Study Circle =

UK-based non-profit society

The study circle logo.

The Gibraltar Study Circle is a global non-profit society based in the United Kingdom, founded by Walter (Wally) Jackson in 1975. Its aim is to expand the knowledge of the philately of Gibraltar, a British overseas territory located at the entrance to the Mediterranean Sea overlooking the Strait of Gibraltar. The study circle looks at the philately of Gibraltar in all its forms for the benefit of collectors (philatelists) from all walks of life. This includes studying the postal history, postage stamps, revenue stamps, postal stationery and associated overprints from Gibraltar and any of these used in Morocco. Any new information is shared with the membership via its quarterly journal, "The Rock", which has been published since 1975, showing articles of interest not only to philatelists but also historians, artists and sociologists.

The society has bi-annual meetings over a long weekend, mostly in the UK but sometimes in Gibraltar. The Spring meeting is generally held for the Annual General Meeting whilst the other is held in the Autumn for the annual competition, at which displays of a wide variety of philately related material are shown - not just stamps, but any historical or artistic artefacts with a (sometimes tenuous) link to Gibraltar philately.

The Study Circle welcomes members from all corners of the globe, whatever your level of expertise or area of interest.

The circle is not to be confused with the Gibraltar Philatelic Society which is based in Gibraltar itself.

== Selected Study Circle publications ==
The following books have been published by the Gibraltar Study Circle. Some of these are still available, others are only available via the GSC Library.

- British Post Offices and Agencies in Morocco 1857 – 1898 by Dr Kenneth Clough
- British Post Offices and Agencies in Morocco 1857 – 1907 and Local Posts 1891 – 1914 by Dr Kenneth Clough
- Gibraltar: Collecting King George VI by Edmund Chambers, 2003 ISBN 0-9509947-4-X
- Gibraltar: Embroidered Silk Postcards – 2nd Edition by Eric D Holmes, 2013
- Gibraltar: Errors, Flaws & Varieties 1886-2008 by R.G.W. Burton, 2008
- Gibraltar: The Link with the Sea by Sam Smith, 1997
- Gibraltar: New Constitution Double Overprint by Edmund Chambers, 2012
- Gibraltar Postal Stationery 2nd Edition by Wally Jackson, updated in 2006 by Eric Holmes & Robert Neville
- Gibraltar: The Postal History & Postage Stamps Vol.1 to 1885 by Geoffrey Osborn, 1995
- Gibraltar: Quarantine and Disinfection of Mail by Garcia/Vandervelde
- Gibraltar First Day Covers by R.H. Neville, 1984.
- Gibraltar: The postal history and postage stamps. Volume 4 - Gibraltar Postal Stationery by Eric D. Holmes & Robert H. Neville, second edition, 2013. ISBN 0-9509947-7-4

== See also ==
- Postage stamps and postal history of Gibraltar
- British post offices in Morocco
- Postage stamps and postal history of Gibraltar
