= Gibraltar College =

- The College

Location
- South Bastion, Line Wall Road; Gibraltar; 36°08′04″N 5°21′12″W

Information
- Type: College
- Principal: Michelle Soiza
- Teaching staff: 34
- Gender of pupils: Mixed
- Website: Official Website
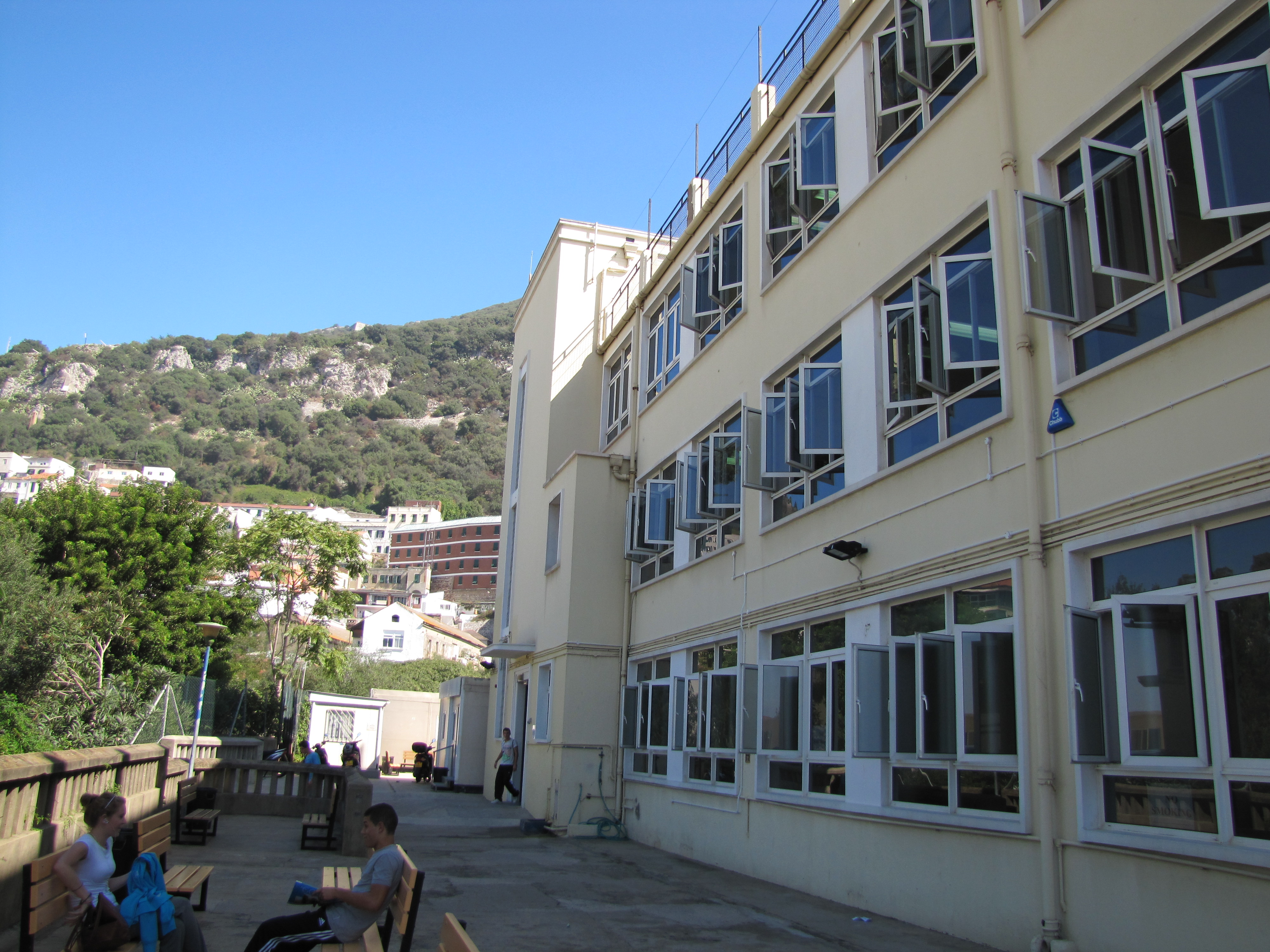
- Gibraltar College façade.

The Gibraltar College is a school in the British Overseas Territory of Gibraltar, providing programmes at academic, vocational and professional levels. It focuses on the post-16 age group, promoting a culture of lifelong learning.

The college also has a strong programme supporting special needs children.

Located on South Bastion, the college has been run by the Government of Gibraltar since 1985.

The college's began when it was joined with the Dockyard Technical School established in 1948, and the Queensway site opened in 1949. It was converted into the Technical College during the 1960s.

== Notable staff ==
- Clive Beltran - Principal (2002-2003), went on to become Government Minister for Education and Training and as well as Mayor of Gibraltar.

== See also ==
- Bayside Comprehensive School
- Westside School (Gibraltar)
