= Armorial of Gibraltar =

This is a list of coats of arms and other emblems of Gibraltar, a British Overseas Territory located on the southern end of the Iberian Peninsula at the entrance of the Mediterranean.

== Gibraltar ==
Coat of Arms of Gibraltar

Arms of Gibraltar
(Without motto)

Arms of Gibraltar
(Without motto and bordure)

== Gibraltar Government ==
Coat of Arms of the Government of Gibraltar

== Versions ==
Badge of Gibraltar

Coat of Arms of Gibraltar
(Unofficial Mazoned Variant)

Badge of the
Government Ensign

Coat of Arms of the Royal Gibraltar Regiment

Badge of the
Gibraltar Squadron
(Royal Navy)

Badge of the RAF Gibraltar

Badge of the Royal Gibraltar Police

Badge of the
Gibraltar Defence Police

Badge of the Gibraltar Fire and Rescue Service

Coat of Arms of the Royal Gibraltar Post Office

Coat of Arms of the Gibraltar Football Association

Coat of Arms of the Royal Gibraltar Yacht Club

Logo of the Gibraltar Heritage Trust

== Historical ==
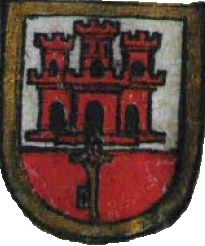
Coat of Arms of Gibraltar,
1502-c.1506

Coat of Arms of Gibraltar,
c.1506-1704/1713

Coat of Arms of Gibraltar 1704/1713-1836

Coat of Arms of Gibraltar, 1836-20th Century
Coat of arms of the Government and Council
of Gibraltar, Until 2014
Badge of Gibraltar,
1875-1921

Badge of Gibraltar,
1921-1999

== Variants ==
Coat of Arms of
San Roque

Coat of Arms of the
Gibraltar Countryside Commonwealth

== See also ==
- Armorial of the United Kingdom and dependencies
- List of flags of Gibraltar
