= List of schools in Gibraltar =

This is a list of schools in Gibraltar. Gibraltar has fifteen state schools (eight first schools, six middle schools and two comprehensive schools), one MOD school, two private schools and one language school.

== Primary schools ==
- Governor's Meadow First School
- Hebrew Primary School
- Notre Dame First School and Nursery
- St Bernard's First School and Nursery
- St Joseph's First School and Nursery
- St Mary's First School
- St Paul's First School and Nursery

== Middle schools ==
- Bishop Fitzgerald School
- Gibraltar Hebrew School
- Sacred Heart Middle School
- St Anne's Middle School
- St Joseph's Middle School

== State secondary schools ==
- Bayside Comprehensive School (formerly boys - now co-educational)
- Westside School (formerly girls - now co-educational)

== Special schools ==
- St Martin's Special School

== Independent schools ==
- Loreto Convent School (co-ed, nursery to age 12)
- Prior Park School (co-ed, ages 12–18)

== Language schools ==
- Little English

== Former schools ==
- Christian Brothers School
- Gibraltar Public School
- Brympton Preparatory School

== See also ==
- Education in Gibraltar
- Gibraltar College
- University of Gibraltar
