= Education in Gibraltar =

Department of Education and Training
- Director of Education and Training: Jaqueline Mason

General details
- Primary languages: English
- System type: National

Literacy (2005–06)
- Total: 80+

Attainment
- Post-secondary diploma: 23%

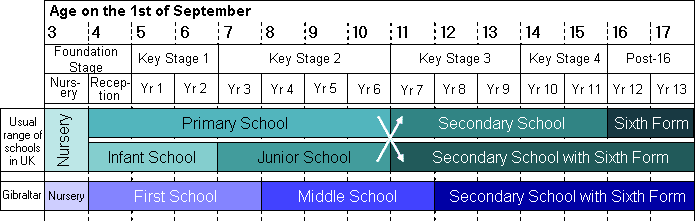
Comparison of school structures in Gibraltar and England

Education in Gibraltar generally follows the English system operating within a three tier system. Schools in Gibraltar follow the Key Stage system which teaches the National Curriculum.

== Secondary education ==
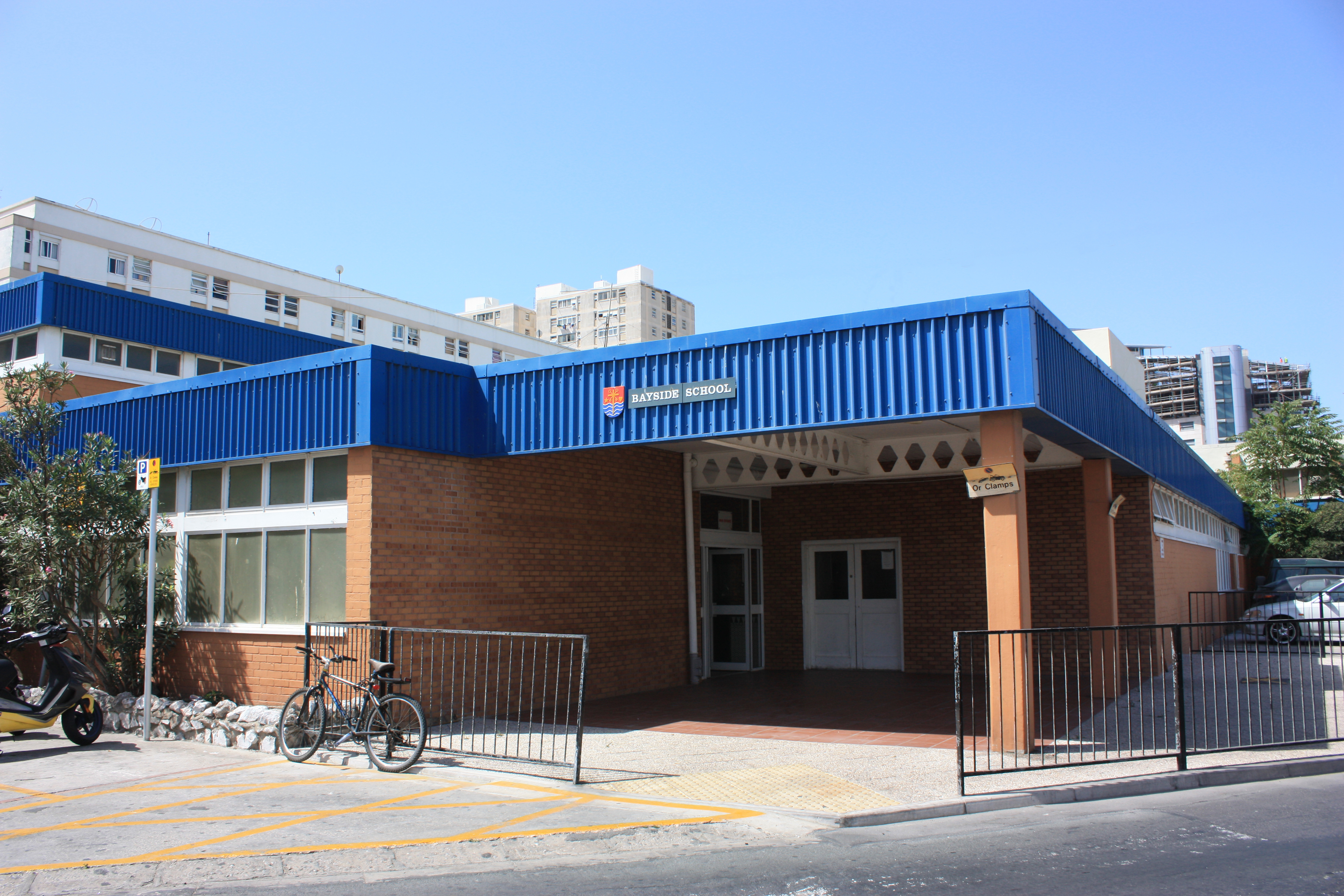
Bayside Comprehensive School

At the age of 12 Gibraltarian students enter secondary school. Following a four-year course preparing for General Certificate of Secondary Education (GCSE), where students sit for final examinations at the age of 16. Students can take on up to 10 GCSE subjects including the core 5 (English, mathematics, science, religious studies and Spanish). Students willing to continue their studies after taking their GCSEs can move onto sixth form (in the same school) providing they have obtained a minimum requirement of 4 subject passes at grade C or higher (generally including English and mathematics). Here the student will go onto a two-year A-Level course. Gibraltarian students can take up to 4 different A-Level subjects simultaneously.

Government secondary schools are Bayside Comprehensive School and Westside School. Prior Park School Gibraltar is an independent secondary school.

== Schools ==
Gibraltar has fifteen state schools, one MOD school, one private school.

== Further education ==
- Gibraltar College (formerly known as the Gibraltar College of Further Education)

== Higher education ==
On 31 March 2015, the government of Gibraltar announced the adoption of the University of Gibraltar Act. The University of Gibraltar, the first university of the territory, opened in September 2015.

The Government of Gibraltar operates a scholarship/grant system to provide funding for students studying in the United Kingdom. All Gibraltarian students followed the student loans system in the United Kingdom, where they apply for a loan from the Student Loans Company which is then reimbursed in full by the Government of Gibraltar. In August 2010, this system was replaced by the direct payment by the government of grants and tuition fees. The overwhelming majority of Gibraltarians continue their studies at university level.

In 2008, there were 224 Gibraltarian students enrolled in British universities, the highest figure to that date.

From 2021 students are eligible for the UK Turing scheme, with the government of Gibraltar willing to contribute to costs if the placement is a requirement of the university course.

== Teaching ==
All teacher-training takes place in British universities and colleges, where students can opt to enrol on a teaching degree or a Post Graduate Certificate of Education (PGCE). Students obtaining Qualified Teacher Status (QTS) in any constituent country of the United Kingdom and who have a registration number issued by the DfES (UK) is eligible to teach in Gibraltar.

== Early history ==
The Duke of Kent during his brief period as a resident Governor of Gibraltar recommended that schools be set up for the regiments. These were reorganised in 1916 by General Don into a school at Buena Vista and another on Castle Street, Gibraltar. The priority given to the schools however can be judged by their closure in 1828 when the Barrack Master was demanding the premises. This was unfortunate as examinations were in progress and the schools were open to better off civilians who could afford the dollar a week charges. Of the 180 children available, 70 had been attending.

The regrowth of the schools can be assigned to Mary Ann Rule who was the wife of William Harris Rule a newly arrived Methodist missionary in Gibraltar. They had both learnt Spanish and Mary was asked to teach one child to read. She was joined by her brother and then other Catholics and then Jewish children. Rule noted that he became unawares the founder of the first charity school in the garrison". The Jews eventually withdrew on religious grounds and Rule was involved when the Lieutenant Governor Sir William Houston set up the first official free school on Flat Bastion Road in 1832 and he sent his own children there.

The following year Rule restarted his school requiring his pupils to attend Methodist services each Sunday. In reply the Catholics arranged for two teachers from the Congregation of Christian Brothers to start the Christian Brothers School in 1835. Rules school however was popular across the faiths but this came to a head in 1839 when his school marched down Main Street on the centenary of Methodism with 400 children of all faiths and denominations waiving messages in support of Methodism.

== See also ==
- Education in England
- University of Gibraltar
