= Colin Ramirez =

Gibraltarian footballer (born 1971)

- Born: 1 February 1971 (age 55); Gibraltar
- Occupations: Firefighter; footballer
Association football career
- Position: Midfielder
Youth career
- Customs Football Club
- College Football Club
Senior career*
Years	Team	Apps	(Gls)
1987–1993	Gibraltar United		
1993–1994	Glentoran		
1994–1995	Manchester United (Gibraltar)		
1995–1996	Crusaders		
1996	Distillery		
1997–1999	Linense	50	(2)
1999	Los Barrios	16	(0)
2000–????	Manchester United (Gibraltar)		
International career
1987–2006	Gibraltar	9+	(5+)
- * Club domestic league appearances and goals

Colin Ramirez (born 1 February 1971) is a Gibraltarian firefighter and former footballer who played as a midfielder. He became the chief fire officer of Gibraltar in 2020.

== Football career ==
=== Club career ===
Ramirez started his career at Gibraltar United at the age of 16. In 1989, after the opening of the Gibraltar–Spain border, Ramirez went on trial with CD Málaga, who nearly signed him, but issues regarding citizenship prevented him from joining.

In 1993, he was spotted by former England international footballer Peter Barnes, who recommended him to Northern Irish club Glentoran, where he signed in August 1993 after having been on trial with the club for a month. In December 1993, he went on a ten-day trial with Notts County, before later being released by Glentoran in March 1994 to return to Gibraltar with Manchester United. In 1995, he moved to Australia to join a team in Newcastle, but returned to Gibraltar after the team folded. In December 1995, he returned to Northern Ireland to join Crusaders for six weeks. In March 1996, he signed for Distillery.

In 1997, Ramirez signed for Spanish club Linense. Shortly after signing, on 28 September 1997, he scored the winning goal of a match in the 67th minute against rivals Algeciras. In 1999, he helped the club achieve promotion to the Segunda División B.

=== International career ===
Ramirez was first selected for the Gibraltar national team at the age of 16, making his debut against the Norwegian under-21 national team. His first tournament for Gibraltar was the 1995 Island Games, where during a match against Ynys Môn, he suffered a fractured nose. He continued to play for the national team for 19 years, being made the team captain in 1999, before retiring at the age of 35 in 2006.

In 2021, the IFFHS included Ramirez in their men's all-time Gibraltar dream team.

== Firefighting career ==
Ramirez initially applied to become a fireman at the age of 18, but was rejected. In January 2000, he joined the Gibraltar Fire and Rescue Service, where he became the "best overall recruit" in the 16-week development programme. On 24 January 2020, he was promoted to chief fire officer of Gibraltar.

== Personal life ==
Ramirez is married and has two children. His father Adolfo was also a footballer, and later became a manager, notably coaching the Gibraltar football team between 1995 and 1997. His uncles, Frank, Pepe and Jaime, were also footballers.
