= Disputed status of the isthmus between Gibraltar and Spain =

Coordinates: 36°09′09″N 05°20′42″W

Map of Gibraltar. The airport is located on the south part of the isthmus that connects the territory to Spain.

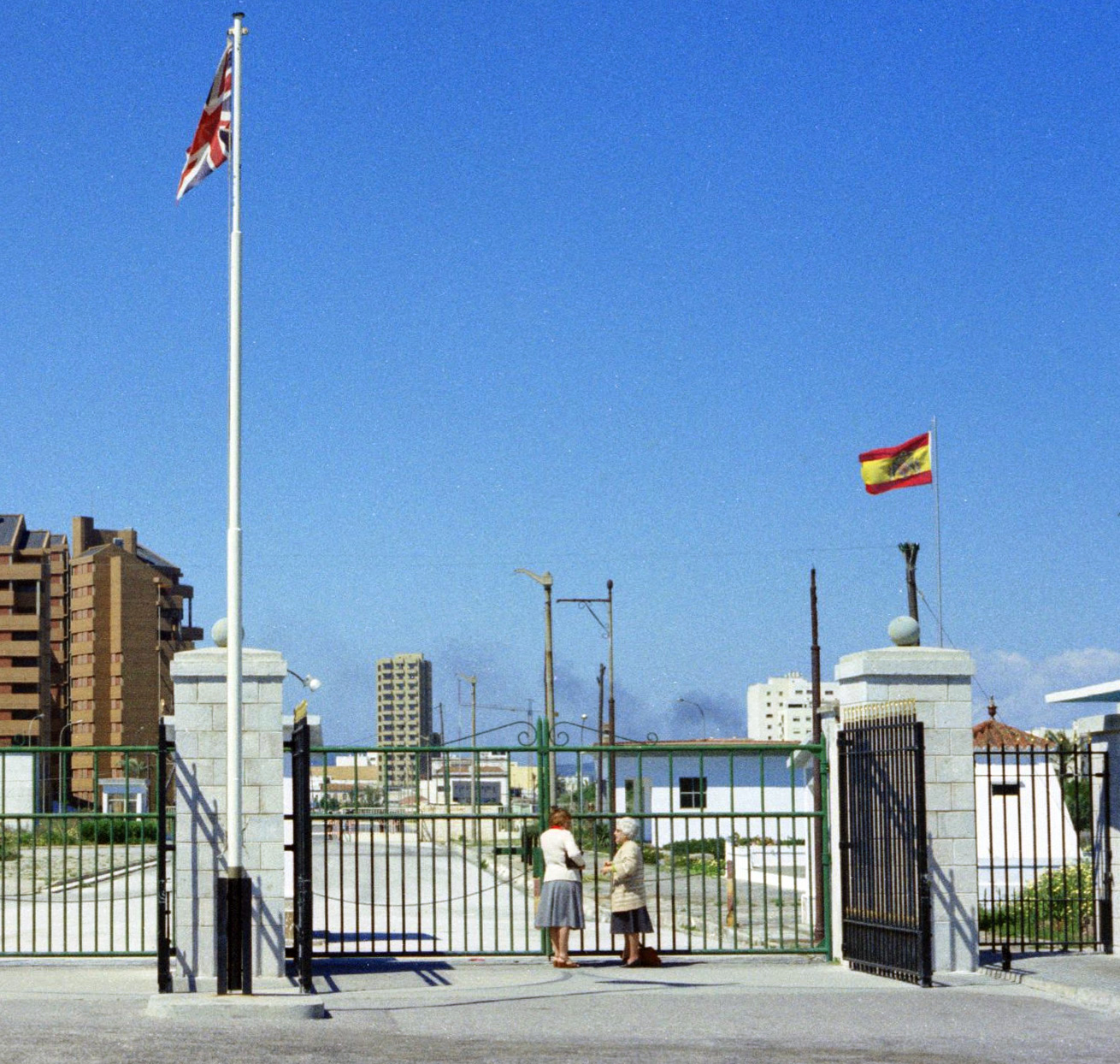
The closed Spanish gate at the border between Gibraltar and Spain, 1977

The Gibraltar territory currently contains an 800-metre (2,625 ft) long section of the isthmus that links the Rock with mainland Spain. Spain does not acknowledge British sovereignty over Gibraltar beyond the fortified perimeter of the town as at 1704. The United Kingdom claims the southern part of the isthmus on the basis of continuous possession over a long period.

As well as the airport, there are two substantial housing estates, a sports stadium, a secondary school, a marina, and a beach on this land, which de facto is an integral part of the territory of Gibraltar.

== Positions of each side ==
One of the sources of the dispute is the lack of appropriate definitions of what had been actually ceded to Great Britain. The Treaty of Utrecht in 1713 did not include any map or specific description of the ceded elements, so that Article X is subject to different interpretations from each side. According to Article X of the Treaty of Utrecht, dominion is ceded over the town and castle of Gibraltar, together with the port, fortifications, and forts thereunto belonging.

=== Spanish position ===
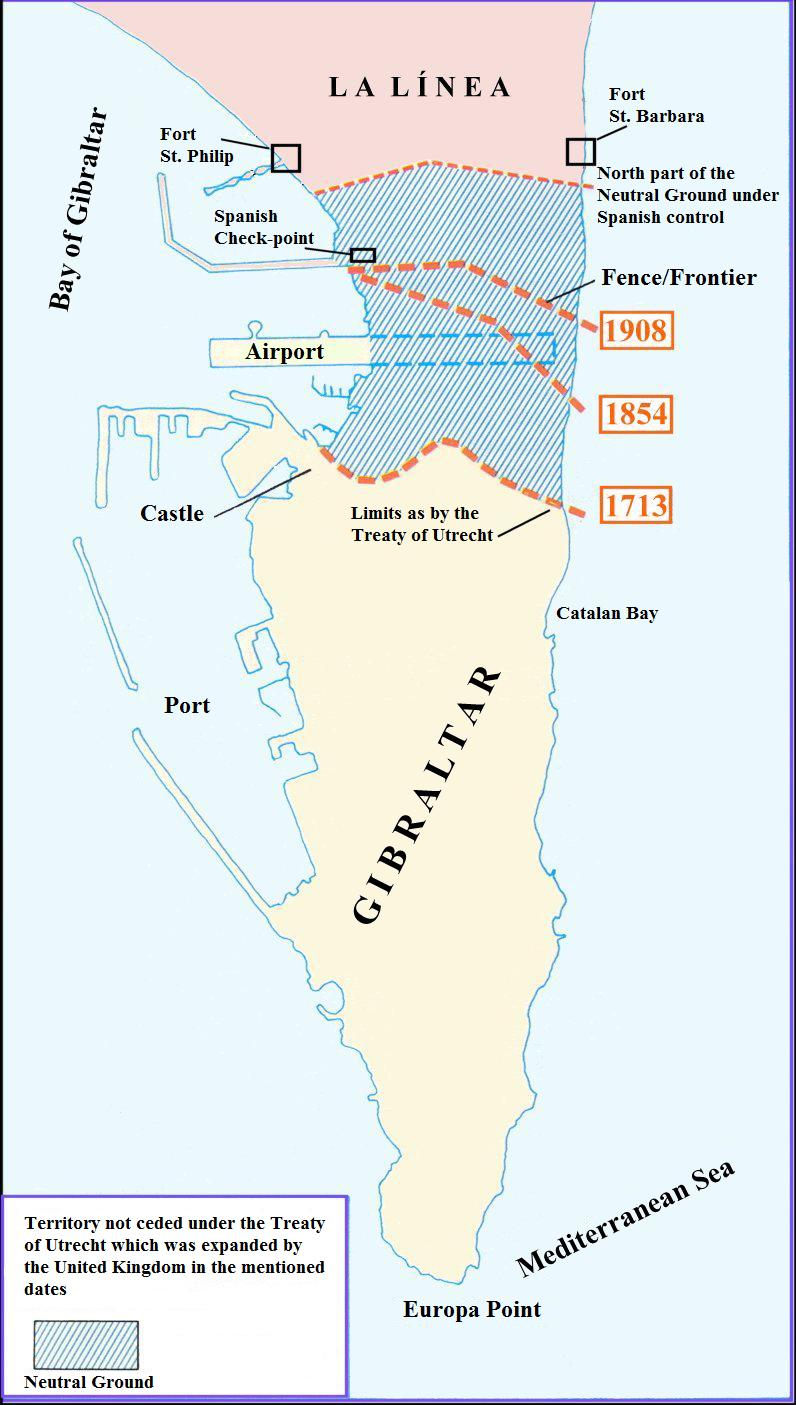
Map of the status of the isthmus according to the Spanish position.

Spain does not acknowledge British sovereignty over Gibraltar, as they consider that the only part that was ceded was the fortified perimeter of the city, and the rest had no territorial jurisdiction (the literal phrase of the treaty is "the Catholic King wills, and takes it to be understood that the above-named propriety be yielded to Great Britain without any territorial jurisdiction"). Therefore, the Treaty would not have ceded any part of the isthmus. Spain considers that such an area was occupied by the UK since the 19th century (1815), and such "occupation of the isthmus [by the United Kingdom] is illegal and against the principles of the international law". For said reason, British sovereignty is not acknowledged by Spain, considering itself instead to be owner of the territory (see map).

The British informed Spain of its intention to build barracks on the isthmus's neutral ground in 1815, which Spain agreed to for the duration of, and to assist in dealing with, a yellow fever epidemic in Gibraltar, and the buildings remained thereafter. The airport was built unilaterally by the British on another section of neutral ground in 1938, while Spain was fighting a civil war, thus further reducing the original size of the neutral ground.

Referring to the current demarcation, Spanish official terminology always uses the word "fence" (verja in Spanish) instead of "frontier" or "border", since it does not acknowledge the possibility of having a frontier with what Spain considers to be its own territory.

=== British position ===
The United Kingdom relies on de facto arguments of possession by prescription in relation to the southern part of the isthmus, as there has been "continuous possession [of the isthmus] over a long period".

On 2 December 1987, in a joint British-Spanish declaration about the use of the airport, as well as in several EU acts, the UK has acknowledged that Spain disputes the sovereignty of the isthmus (The ... arrangements ... are understood to be without prejudice to the respective legal positions of Spain and the United Kingdom with regard to the dispute over sovereignty over the territory in which the airport is situated.), although they reject the basis for that dispute.

The Gibraltar government rejects Spain's argument in its entirety. They point out that as Utrecht ceded "the town and castle of Gibraltar, together with the port, fortifications, and forts thereunto belonging" and there were such "fortifications and forts" along the line of the current frontier (Devil's Tower, El Molino), then this area was included in the cession.

Furthermore, they argue, international practice at the time was that all territorial cessions included an extended surrounding area equivalent to the length of two cannon shots. When the treaty of Seville was concluded between Great Britain, France and Spain in 1729, long arguments ensued between Spain and Britain as to how far north the 'undoubted right' of Britain extended from the north face of the Rock of Gibraltar. It was finally accepted that a distance of 600 Toises, being more than two cannon shots distance between the British guns and the Spanish guns, would be considered “the neutral ground”.

In either case, the United Kingdom further bases its claim upon what they consider to be established legal precedents that grant property rights over an area that is continually occupied and made sole use of, for an extended period.

Maps show the evolution of the British occupation of the isthmus as well as the location of the two items that, according to the Gibraltarian government, were part of the forts ceded in the Treaty of Utrecht (Devil's Tower and Torre del Molino).

=== Status quo ===
In practice Gibraltar begins at the frontier/fence and the 'neutral land' to the north has been absorbed into the town of La Linea and that to the south is an integral part of Gibraltar and what was once 'neutral land' is no longer marked on maps which are in use today.

== See also ==
- Disputed status of Gibraltar

== Sources ==
- Cajal, Máximo (2003). Siglo XXI Editores (ed.). Ceuta, Melilla, Olivenza y Gibraltar. Donde termina España (Ceuta, Melilla, Olivenza y Gibraltar. Where Spain ends). In Spanish. Madrid. ISBN 84-323-1138-3.
- Peter Gold (2005). Gibraltar: British or Spanish?. Routledge. ISBN 0-415-34795-5.
- Hills, George (1974). Rock of Contention. A History of Gibraltar. London: Robert Hale. ISBN 0-7091-4352-4.
- Jackson, William (1990). The Rock of the Gibraltarians. A History of Gibraltar (2nd ed.). Grendon, Northamptonshire, UK: Gibraltar Books. ISBN 0-948466-14-6.
- Sepúlveda, Isidro (2004). Gibraltar. La razón y la fuerza (Gibraltar. The reason and the force). in Spanish. Madrid: Alianza Editorial. ISBN 84-206-4184-7. Chapter 2, "La lucha por Gibraltar" (The Struggle for Gibraltar) is available online (PDF)
