= Georgina Cassar =

Gibraltarian rhythmic gymnast

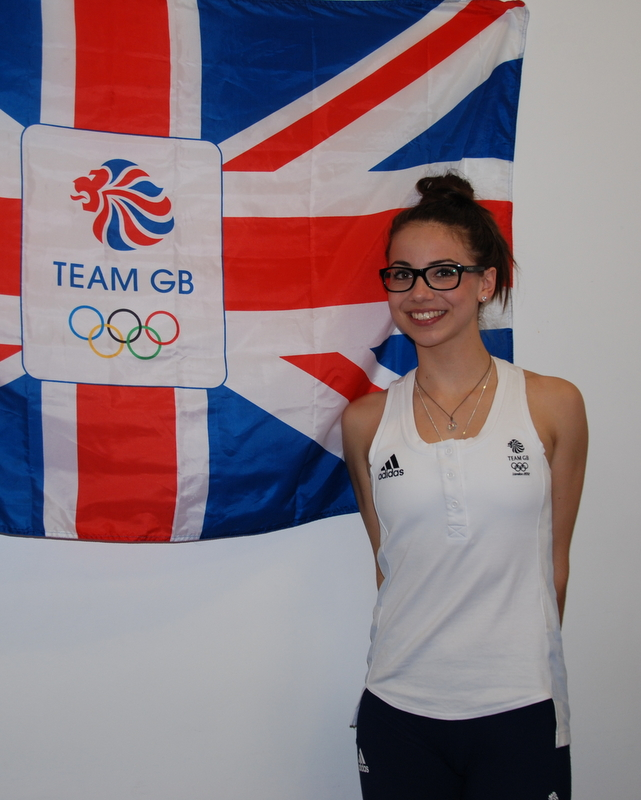

Personal information
- Born: 9 September 1993 (age 33) Welwyn Garden City, United Kingdom
- Height: 1.70 m (5 ft 7 in)

Gymnastics career
- Discipline: Rhythmic gymnastics
- Country represented: United Kingdom
- Club: Gibraltar Rhythmic Gymnastics Association
- Head coach: Sarah Moon
- Former coach: Sally Holmes

Georgina Cassar (born 9 September 1993) is a Gibraltarian/British rhythmic gymnast. She represented Gibraltar at the 2010 Commonwealth Games in Delhi, India and competed for Team GB at the 2012 Summer Olympics in London, United Kingdom.

== Early life ==
Cassar was born on 9 September 1993 in Welwyn Garden City, United Kingdom to Maltese father Franco and English mother Jackie. The family settled in Gibraltar in 1996 when her father took up a senior post at a local bank. She was mainly educated in Gibraltar having attended Governor's Meadow Primary School, Bishop Fitzgerald Middle School and Westside School.

== Gymnastics career ==
Cassar began training in ballet at the age of three. Cassar represented Gibraltar at the 2010 Commonwealth Games in Delhi, India. She came 16th in the overall competition. In 2012, she travelled to Bath to train full-time with the Olympic team. While there, she studied A-levels in psychology, biology and PE at King Edward's School. She planned on remaining in Bath for her second year of A-levels following the games.

=== Olympic debut ===
Cassar competed for Team GB at the 2012 Summer Olympics in London, United Kingdom. She could not represent her native Gibraltar because the Gibraltar Olympic Committee is not recognised by the International Olympic Committee; however, using a similar by-law to Anguillan long jumper Shara Proctor and Turks and Caicos Islander Delano Williams, Cassar was eligible to represent the United Kingdom as Gibraltar is a British Overseas Territory and so she holds a British passport. She is the first athlete from Gibraltar to compete at the Olympic Games.

Cassar appeared on 10 August with the rest of Team GB. They came in 12th and failed to make the finals.
