= Postal orders of Gibraltar =

Legal process

Postal orders are currently issued in Gibraltar by the Royal Gibraltar Post Office.

In accordance with the Postal Order Regulations of 1961, postal orders may be issued for the following sums:

1. The sum of 50 pence; and
2. The sum of one pound and any multiple of one pound up to ten pounds

The value of a postal order may be increased by affixing postage stamps not exceeding two in number and not exceeding a total of 49 pence or the equivalent in coinage of the country in which the order is issued. Any such stamp may either be a stamp authorized or required to be used for the purpose of the post office or, if the postal administration of the country in which the order is issued so allows, a current stamp for denoting a rate of postage of that country, but no other stamps may be used.

A charge for poundage is applied according to the rates applicable when the order is issued.

== See also ==
- Postal order
- Postage stamps and postal history of Gibraltar
