= Gibraltar Fire and Rescue Service =

Gibraltar Fire and Rescue

Operational area
- Country: Gibraltar
- Address: 5 Red Sands Road Gibraltar

Agency overview
- Established: 1865; 161 years ago
- Commissioner: Colin Ramirez
- Motto: “Preventing, Protecting, Responding”

Facilities and equipment
- Divisions: 1
- Stations: 1
- Fireboats: 1

Website
- Official website

The Gibraltar Fire and Rescue Service serves the City of Gibraltar. The GFRS provides prevention, protection and response services across the entire peninsula.

It consists of a single fire station at 5 Red Sands Road.

The GFRS has their own workshop, maintenance area, and Breathing Apparatus and Fire Simulator.

The GFRS trains to respond to a variety of incidents such as fires, rope rescue, dive rescue, road traffic collisions, ship firefighting, mountain rescue, HAZMAT incidents and many more. It also enforces fire codes to help prevent incidents.

The GFRS works closely with Royal Gibraltar Police, the Ambulance Service and Gibraltar Airport Fire & Rescue Service.

== Establishment and role ==
The history of a fire service in Gibraltar dates back to 1865. In 1976, the Gibraltar Fire and Rescue Service was established by the Fire Service Act 1976–19. Its name and purpose is specified as follows:

3.(1) There shall be a fire and rescue service, to be called the Gibraltar Fire and Rescue Service, for the purpose of protecting life and property in case of fire or other calamity and of extinguishing fires endangering life and property within Gibraltar, other than those areas for the time being occupied by the Ministry of Defence.
