= Coat of arms of Gibraltar =

- Armiger: Gibraltar
- Shield: Argent, upon a base gules a castle triple-towered of the same ported and windowed sable with a cord issuant from the portal, pendent therefrom a key Or.
- Motto: Insignia Montis Calpe "Badge of the Rock of Gibraltar"
- Designer: Isabella I of Castile (original design)

The coat of arms of Gibraltar was first granted by a Royal Warrant passed in Toledo on 10 July 1502 by Isabella I of Castile during Gibraltar's Spanish period. The arms consists of an escutcheon and features a three-towered red castle under which hangs a golden key.

== Heraldic description ==
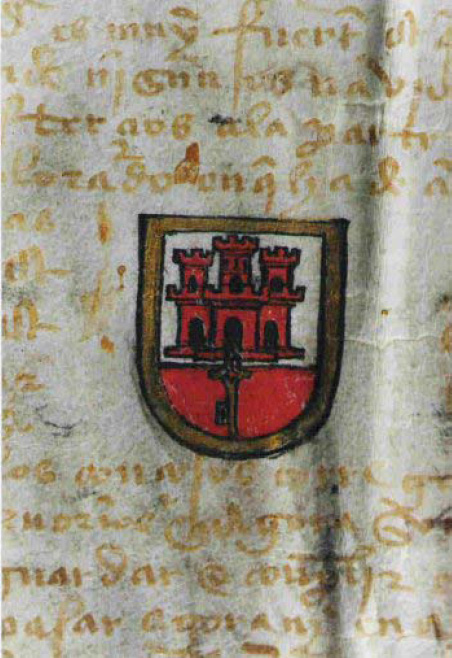
Original arms granted to Gibraltar by Isabella I of Castile

The arms were described in the Royal Warrant as consisting of:

"...an escutcheon on which two thirds of its upper part shall have a white field; in the said field set a red Castle; underneath the said Castle, on the other third of the escutcheon, which must be a red field in which there must be a white line between the Castle and the said red field; on this a golden key which shall be on that with a chain from the said castle..."

The arms consist of a shield parted per fess:

- 1st Division: Two thirds Argent, a triple-towered castle of Gules, masoned and ajouré of Sable.
- 2nd Division: One third Gules, a key of Or hanging by a chain also of Or from the castle.

The castle has its roots in the heraldry of the Kingdom of Castile, the largest and most important medieval Spanish kingdom, of which Isabella was Queen. The preamble to the warrant granting the coat of arms to Gibraltar said:

"...and we, deeming it right, and acknowledging that the said City is very strong and by its situation it is the key between these our kingdoms in the Eastern and Western Seas and the sentinel and defence of the Strait of the said Seas through which no ships of peoples of either of these Seas can pass to the other without sighting it or calling at it."

The idea of Gibraltar being the key to Spain or the Mediterranean originated well before the Spanish conquest. The followers of Tariq ibn Ziyad, who invaded Spain via Gibraltar in 711, are said to have adopted the symbol of the key when they settled in Granada. The coat of arms was accompanied by the inscription "Seal of the noble city of Gibraltar, the Key of Spain".

== Use ==
The coat of arms of the government of Gibraltar combines that of His Majesty's Government and Gibraltar's own coat of arms.

Today, the official coat of arms as used by the government of Gibraltar consists of the original coat of arms with the addition of the motto Montis Insignia Calpe ("Insignia of the Mountain of Calpe"; Mons Calpe was the Latin name of the Rock of Gibraltar), which was granted by the College of Arms in 1836 to commemorate the 1779–83 Great Siege of Gibraltar. It is the oldest coat of arms in use in a British overseas territory and is unique in that it is the only armorial insignia that dates from before the period of British colonial administration.

The arms differ from the seal of Gibraltar, which is an image of the Rock of Gibraltar with a sailing ship in the forefront. There is no evidence available as to when this image was created. From 1982, a banner of the arms has been used as the flag of Gibraltar. The arms also appear in the flag of the governor of Gibraltar. The arms of the government of Gibraltar are the same as the royal coat of arms of the United Kingdom combined with a badge featuring the coat of arms of Gibraltar.

== Variations ==
The coat of arms of San Roque, Cádiz, derived from that of Gibraltar

A very similar coat of arms is in use by the nearby Spanish municipality of San Roque, using a slightly different version of the same main heraldic elements (the escutcheon with the castle and key), with the addition of the old Spanish Royal Crown above the escutcheon.

When Gibraltar was captured by an Anglo-Dutch force on behalf of the pretender to the Spanish Throne, the Archduke Charles, in 1704, the city council and much of the population established a new town near the existing chapel of Saint Roch to the west of Gibraltar,

The coat of arms of the Campo de Gibraltar in an area that remained under Spanish control.

The Royal Warrant of 1502 which granted the coat of arms was taken by the city council to San Roque along with Gibraltar's standard and records, and is now in the San Roque municipal archives. The establishment became a new town in 1706, addressed by King Philip V of Spain as "My city of Gibraltar resident in its Campo", and becoming the Spanish Gibraltar. Therefore, they kept the old coat of arms granted to Gibraltar in 1502.

In 2015, the Commonwealth of the Municipalities of the Campo de Gibraltar (Cádiz) adopted a coat of arms and a flag. This new coat of arms shows the elements of the coat of arms of Gibraltar with seven green stars that represent the municipalities of the Commonwealth, two equal horizontal stripes (green and purple) with the colours of this organisation, and a bordure Or with its motto PRO GEOGRAPHIA, HISTORIA ET VOLUNTATE CONIVNCTI (Latin: United by geography, history, and will). The modern Spanish Royal Crown is used as heraldic crest.

== See also ==
- Armorial of Gibraltar
- List of coats of arms of the United Kingdom and dependencies
- History of Gibraltar
- Spanish heraldry
