= British post offices in Morocco =

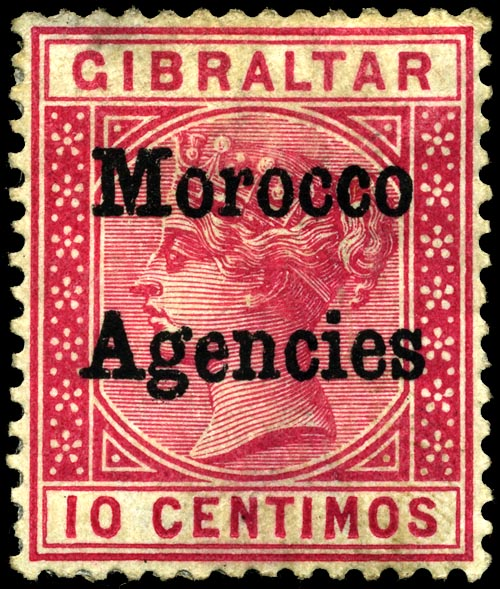
Overprint on Gibraltar stamp for the British post offices in Morocco, 1898

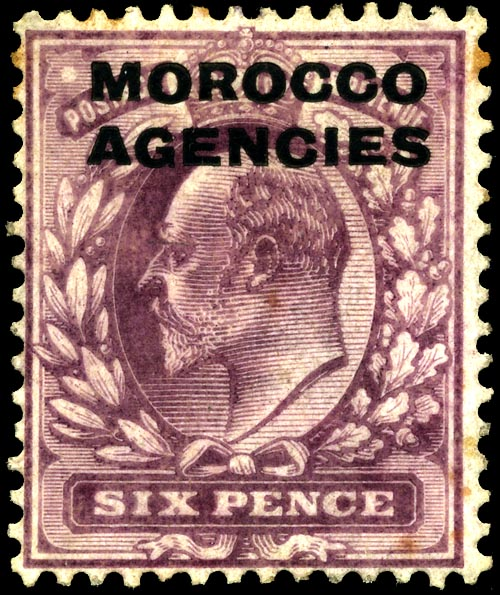
Stamp for the British post offices in Morocco in British currency, 1907

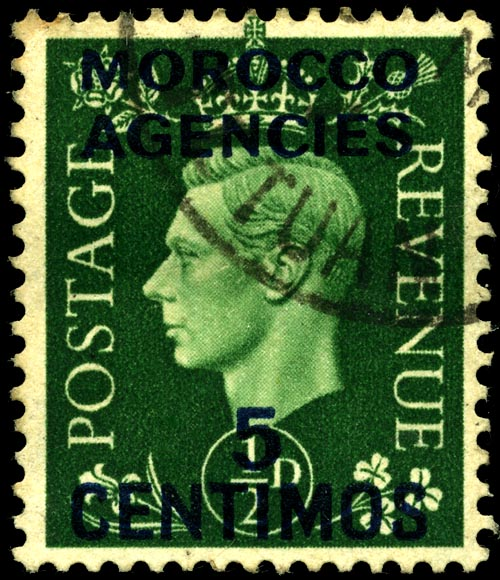
1937 Stamp for the British post offices in Morocco in Spanish currency, cancelled at Tetuan in the 1940s

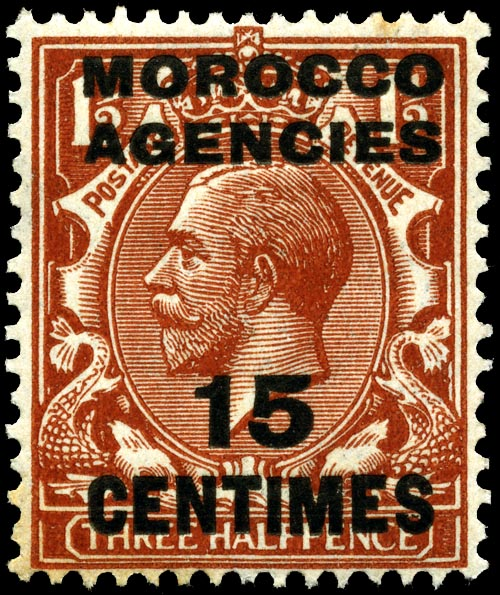
Stamp for the British post offices in Morocco in French currency, 1917

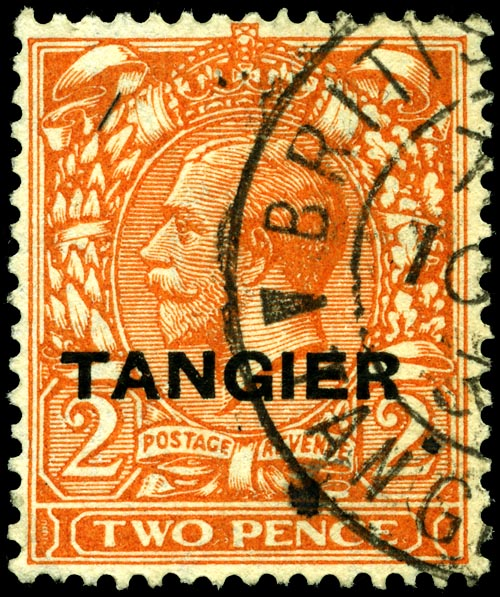
Stamp for the British post office in Tangier, 1927

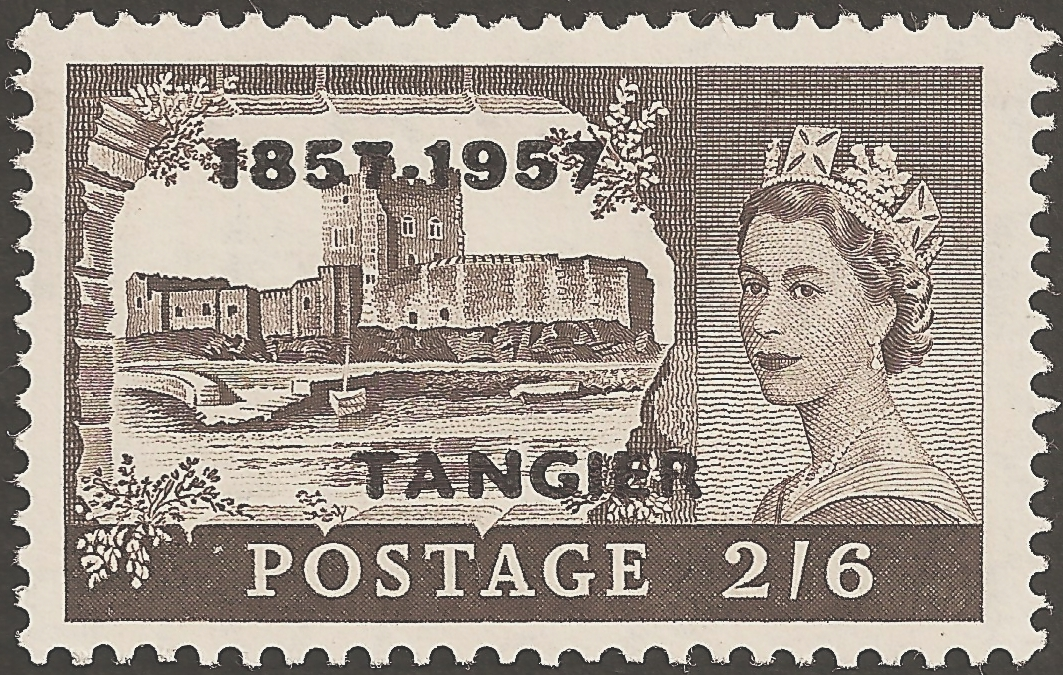
1957 stamp for Tangier celebrating the 100th anniversary of the post office

The British post offices in Morocco, also known as the "Morocco Agencies", were a system of post offices operated by Gibraltar and later the United Kingdom in Morocco.

== First office ==
The first office was established in Tangier in 1857; mail was simply bagged there and forwarded to Gibraltar just across the water, where it received the standard "A26" postmark. From 1872 Tangier had its own postmark, but this was applied alongside the stamps (allowing for the Gibraltar cancellation to mark them), so usages of British stamps from Morocco are best determined on cover. Several examples of loose GB Queen Victoria stamps cancelled Tangier do exist including at least one horizontal strip of 6 1d reds from plate 123.This item was lot 417 in the H R Harmer sale on 12–14 December 1960.

Since the offices were under the control of Gibraltar, they switched to the use of Gibraltar stamps when they came into use, on 1 January 1886. Additional offices opened in various Moroccan seaports during the 1880s, and inland at Fez (1892), and Meknes (1907).

The stamps were overprinted "Morocco / Agencies" beginning in 1898, initially at the offices of the Gibraltar Chronicle, and then later in London, yielding several variations in the appearance of the overprint.

== Direct control ==
On 1 January 1907, the British Post Office took direct control of the post offices, operating them until Moroccan independence in 1956. From that point on, all stamps were overprints on British issues, in no less than three different currencies.

British-currency stamps were available at any office, and primarily intended for parcels and, later, airmail. Both regular and some commemorative issues were overprinted, all with "MOROCCO / AGENCIES", up to the Edward VIII issue of 1936. Subsequently, unoverprinted stamps were used, until 1949, when they were again overprinted for use at Tetuan (at that point the sole remaining office, except for Tangier, which had its own overprints).

== Spanish currency stamps ==
Spanish-currency stamps were also available at all offices until the establishment of the French Zone, after which they were limited to the Spanish Zone. The overprint was basically the same as for the British-currency stamps, with the added complication of needing to fit in the denomination in Centimos and Pesetas. All types of British stamps were overprinted, the last being the issues of Elizabeth II in the summer of 1956; all were withdrawn from sale 31 December of that year.

== French currency stamps ==
French-currency stamps, intended for use in the French Zone, date from 1917, and continued in use until 8 January 1938, when they were withdrawn from sale. The overprints are just as for the Spanish currency, but fewer types were produced.

== Tangier ==
The Tangier International Zone received its own overprints beginning in 1927. As British currency was in use in that office, the overprint simply reads "TANGIER". This continued through 1956. On 1 April 1957, a commemorative overprint added "1857–1957" to celebrate the 100th anniversary of the post office, but this had a very short shelf life; the office at Tangier was closed and the stamps withdrawn from sale on 30 April 1957.

== Philatelic literature ==
The most substantial book on the Morocco Agencies, by Dr David A. Stotter, Chairman of the GB Overprints Society (GBOS), was published in October 2007 by the Postal History Society (PHS) and the British Philatelic Trust (BPT), 367 pp, hardbound, price £49. Entitled "The British Post Office Service in Morocco 1907–57" it covers in great depth the postal history of the so-called British Period, from the transfer of control to the GPO from Gibraltar in January 1907 to the closure of the Tangier post office in April 1957. This book was awarded the RPSL Crawford Medal and a Large Gold at Harrogate 2008.

The first booklet on the Morocco Agencies, written by John H Vallis was published by H F Johnson in 1921. The second was written by R H Sampson, and was published by the Royal Philatelic Society London in 1959 in a limited edition of 250 copies. Subsequent to that the late Dr Ken Clough produced two booklets (the second being a revised version of the first) published by the Gibraltar Study Circle in 1978 and 1984. The G B Overprints Society (GBOS) also published in 1992 a booklet specifically on the Overprinted GB issues of Edward VII written by M H Gellatly & M K Wlodarczyk.

The Gibraltar Period up to the end of 1906 has been covered in great detail in a book written by Richard Garcia now published by the PHS/BPT. The title is: "The British Postal Service in Morocco 1749–1906", details from John Sussex as above. Richard's book, together with that by David Stotter, provides complete coverage of the postal history of the British Post Office in Morocco. A third book in loose leaf format covering the stamps and some postal stationery has also been published by the GBOS.

David has recently published a book covering the postal and social history of Tangier, with chapters on the British, French, Spanish, German and Cherifien postal services there: "A Postcard from Tangier. A Postal & Social History of Tangier 1880–1958" The Postal History Society 2015 ISBN 9780853770343. This book was awarded a Large Vermeil at the recent European Philatelic Exhibition in London.

== See also ==
- Postage stamps and postal history of Morocco
- David A. Stotter

== References and sources ==
Sources

- Stanley Gibbons Ltd: various catalogues
- AskPhil – Glossary of Stamp Collecting Terms
- Encyclopaedia of Postal History
- Rossiter, Stuart & John Flower. The Stamp Atlas. London: Macdonald, 1986, p. 270. ISBN 0-356-10862-7
