= Postage stamps and postal history of Gibraltar =

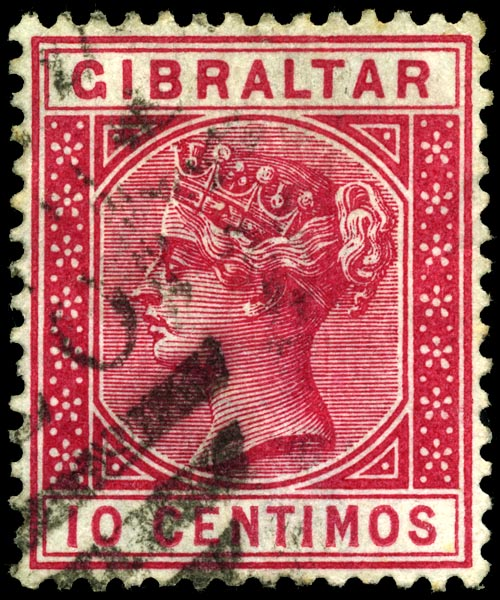
Gibraltar ten centimos Queen Victoria stamp of 1889 (note the use of Spanish currency on a British stamp)

This is a survey of the postage stamps and postal history of Gibraltar.

Gibraltar is a British overseas territory located at the entrance to the Mediterranean Sea overlooking the Strait of Gibraltar. The territory covers 6.843 square kilometres (2.642 sq mi) and shares a land border with Spain to the north. Gibraltar has historically been an important base for the British Armed Forces and is the site of a Royal Navy base. The philately of Gibraltar is inexorably linked to its strategic position and military connections.

== First stamps ==
The first stamps specifically marked Gibraltar were stamps of Bermuda overprinted as such and issued in January 1886. Before that British and Spanish stamps were used according to the type of mail and other arrangements were in place before the invention of postage stamps. British stamps used in Gibraltar may be identified by the use of cancels containing the numeral A26 or the letter G in oval bars.

== Queen Victoria ==
From November 1886 Gibraltar had its own stamps including the word Gibraltar in the design with seven values from 1/2d to 1 shilling. From 1889 these stamps were overprinted in centimos until British currency began to be used again in 1898.

== The Four Kings ==
Between 1903 and 1950 a variety of definitive and commemorative stamps were issued for the reigns of King Edward VII, George V and George VI. No stamps were issued by Gibraltar for King Edward VIII.

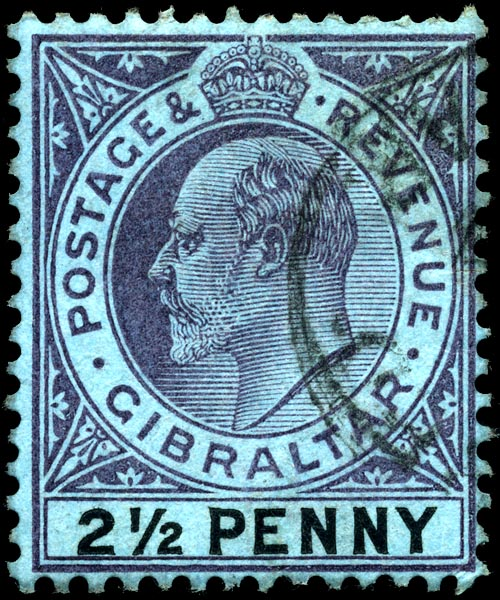
Gibraltar two and a half penny King Edward VII stamp of 1903

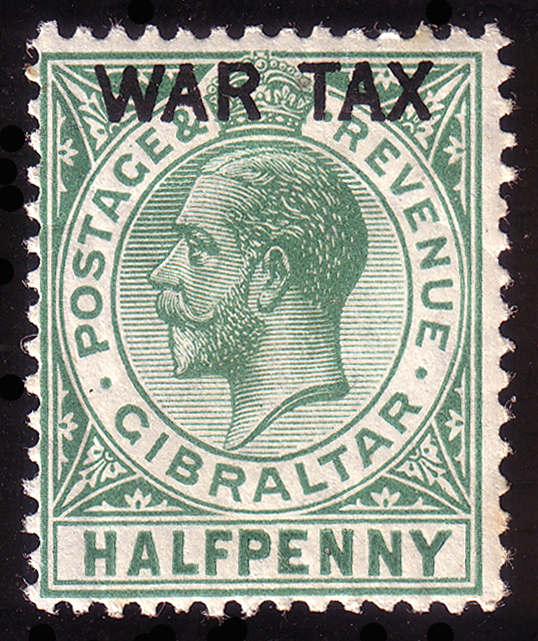
Gibraltar half penny King George V stamp of 1918 overprinted war tax

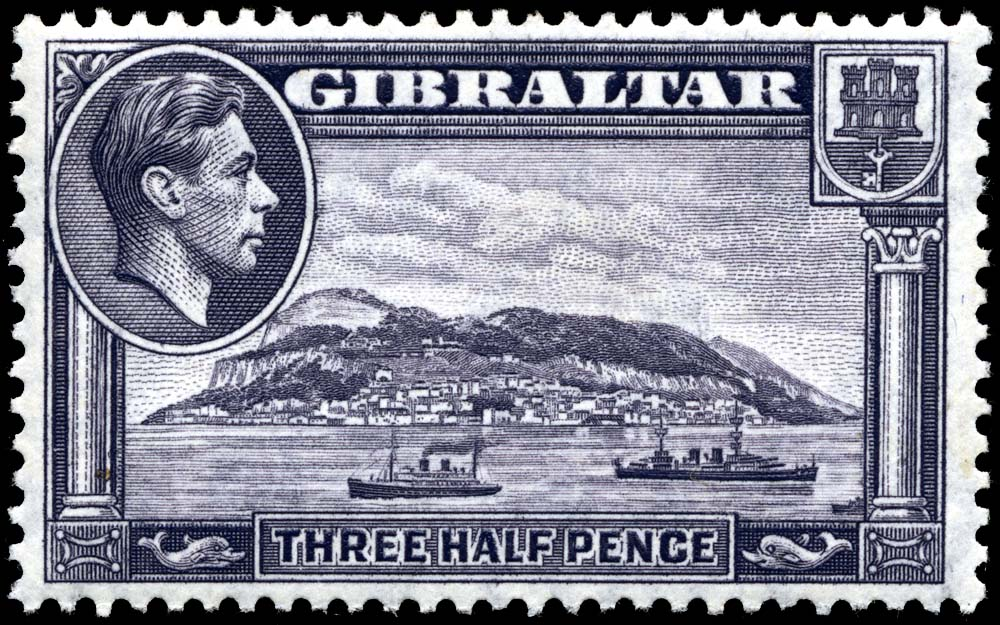
Gibraltar three half pence King George VI stamp of 1943

== Queen Elizabeth II ==
The first stamp of Gibraltar for the reign of Queen Elizabeth II was the 1/2d Coronation commemorative omnibus stamp issued on 2 June 1953.

The post in Gibraltar is currently run by the Royal Gibraltar Post Office which in 2005 was granted the title of "Royal" by Her Majesty the Queen. Gibraltar is now the only Commonwealth or British Overseas Territory outside the United Kingdom that bears this distinction. The Gibraltar Post Office is now known as the Royal Gibraltar Post Office.

Post & Go stamps for Gibraltar were first issued in 2015.

== Postal stationery ==
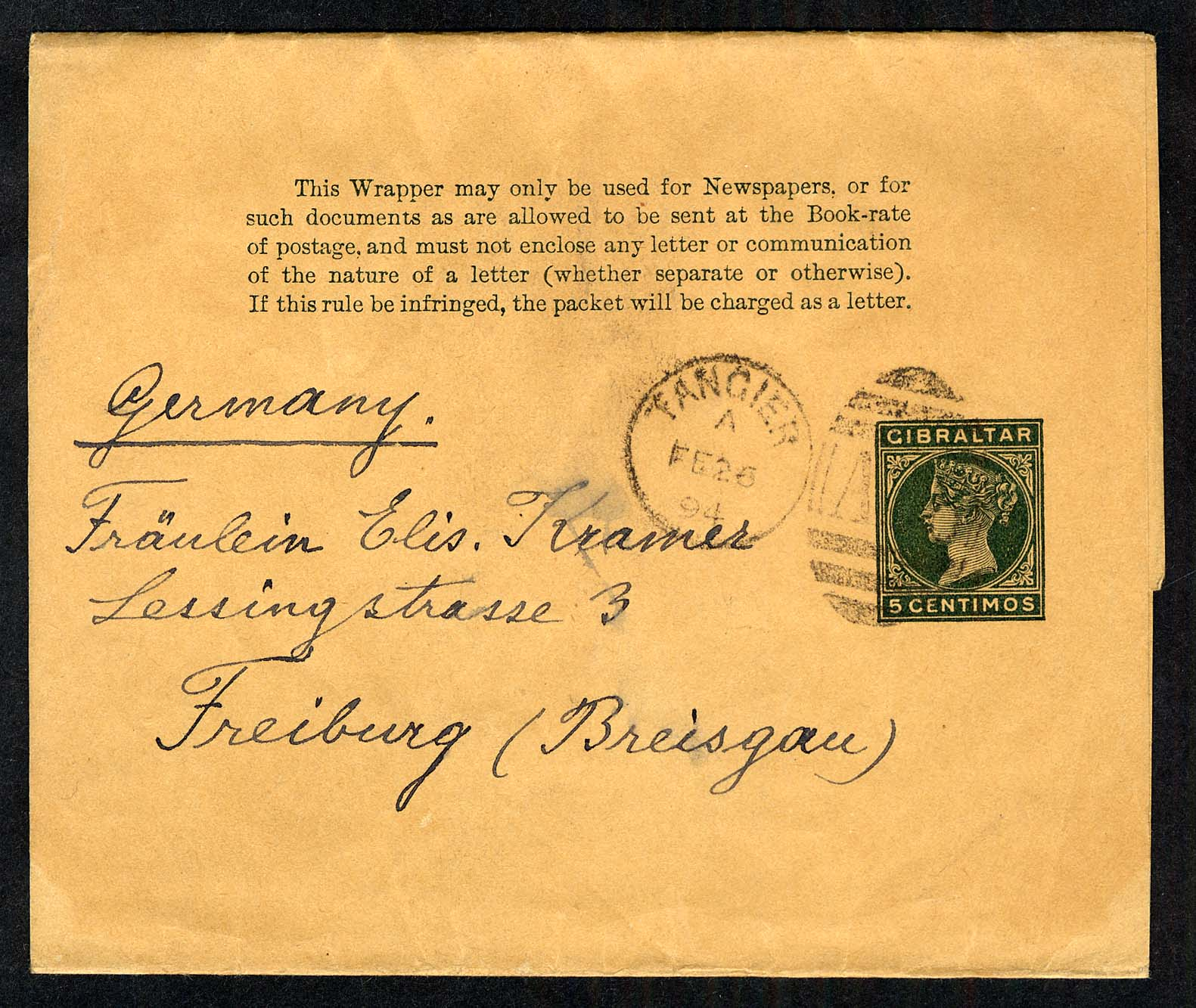
Gibraltar 1889 issue five cent newspaper wrapper used 26 February 1894 from Tangier

In 1886 three items of postal stationery were issued in Gibraltar by overprinting 2d registered envelopes from Barbados, ½d newspaper wrappers from Natal, ½d postcards from Natal and 1d postcards from St Vincent. The following year the three items of postal stationery were issued inscribed Gibraltar. In 1889 Spanish currency was introduced and all the postal stationery was overprinted with new values in cents. Later the same year all the postal stationery was printed and issued inscribed in the new currency.

In 1898 British currency was reintroduced; all the postal stationery was printed and issued in British currency. Newspaper wrappers were last issued in 1938 and discontinued when stocks run out. Letter cards were briefly available with two issues, one in 1933 and the other in 1938 after which they were discontinued. Envelopes were issued in 1935 only and then discontinued. Aerogrammes were first introduced in 1955.

== See also ==
- Gibraltar Study Circle
- Revenue stamps of Gibraltar
