= Revenue stamps of Gibraltar =

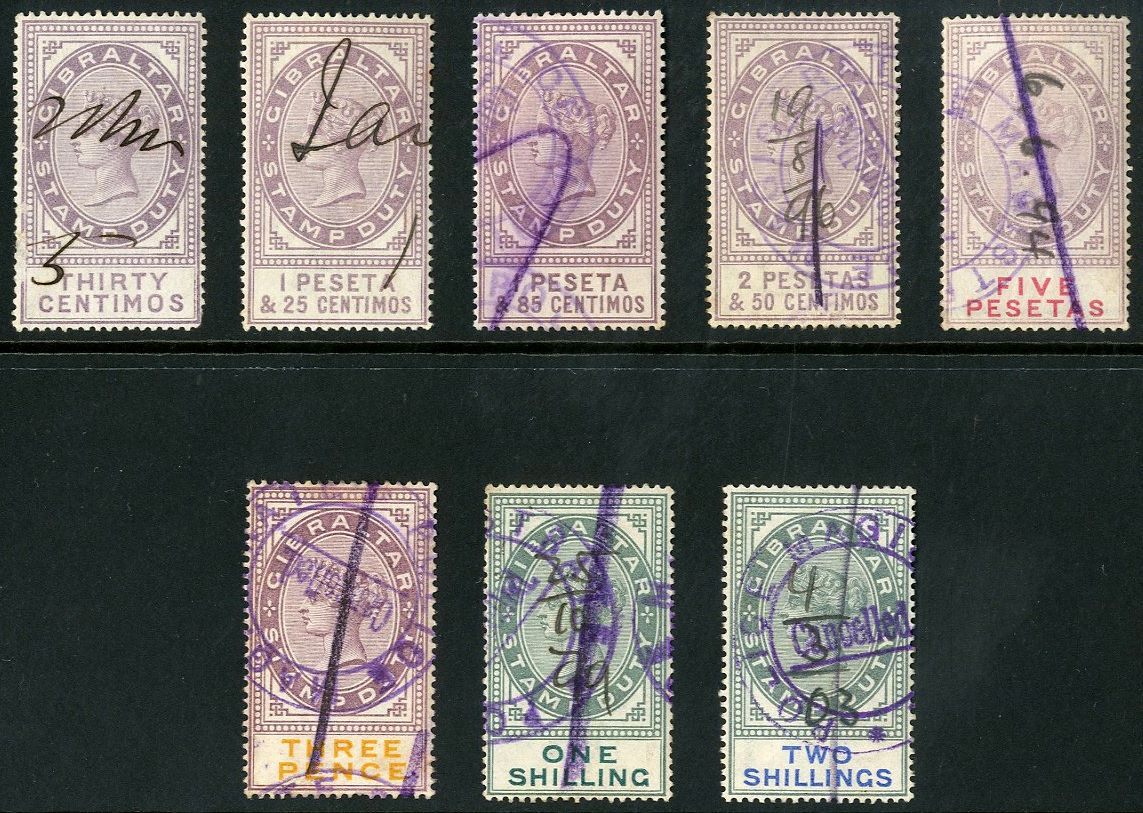
A selection of Gibraltar Stamp Duty revenues.

The British colony of Gibraltar issued revenue stamps from 1884 to 1976.

== Stamp duty ==
All stamp duty revenues portrayed Queen Victoria. Only two sets were issued, the first one being in 1884. This consisted on eight values ranging from 30 centimos to 30 peseta. In 1898 a set in the same design but denominated in Pounds sterling was issued. This had seven values ranging from 1 penny to 1 Pound. These issues were then replaced by dual purpose postage and revenue stamps. In fact the £5 issue of 1925 was, while also valid for postal use, mainly intended for fiscal purposes only.

== Social insurance ==
In 1971 Gibraltar issued the first revenues after over seven decades. This was a numeral design for social insurance and additional values continued to be issued until 1976. At least 28 different values exist, and these were either printed by De La Rue or Bradbury Wilkinson.

== See also ==
- Postage stamps and postal history of Gibraltar
