= Royal Gibraltar Post Office =

Postal service in Gibraltar

Coordinates: 36.141909°N 5.353397°W

- Industry: Postal service
- Founded: 1886
- Headquarters: Main Street, Gibraltar
- Area served: Gibraltar
- Key people: Peter Linares – CEO Sabina Pitaluga – HEO Nanette Enriles – Accounts Manager Paul Acolina – Mail Centre Manager
- Owner: Government of Gibraltar
- Website: post.gi

The Royal Gibraltar Post Office is the postal services in the British overseas territory of Gibraltar. It is currently a department within the Government of Gibraltar.

== History ==
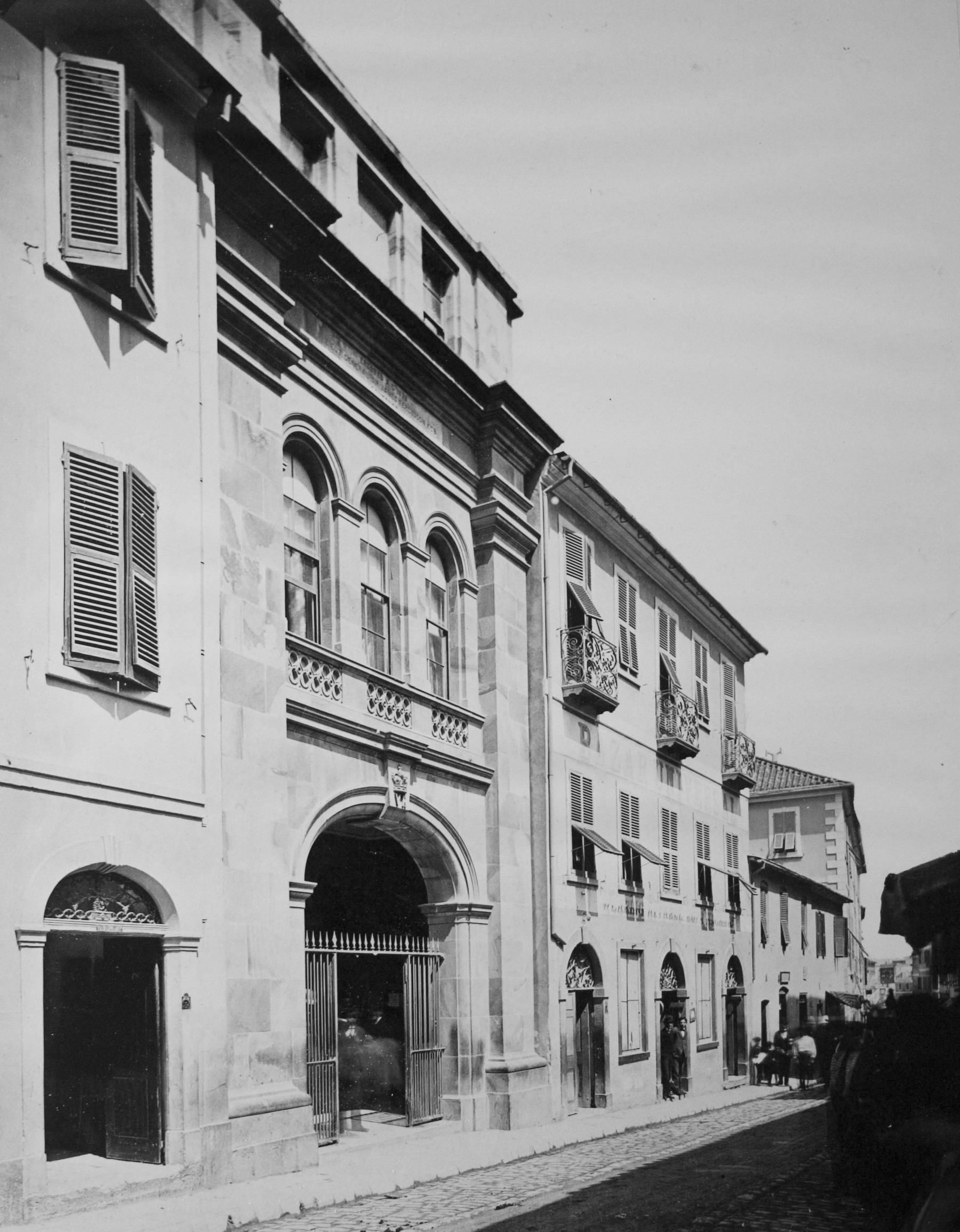
1879 view of the main Post Office in Main Street

The Gibraltar Post Office has been running for over 150 years, as in 1857 the Overland Post Office (based in the colonial authorities' premises at Secretary's Lane) merged with the Packet Agency (which had offices in Turnbull's Lane). The first stamps went on sale in September and a year later a new building was completed and opened at 104 Main Street. This remains the main post office in Gibraltar today.

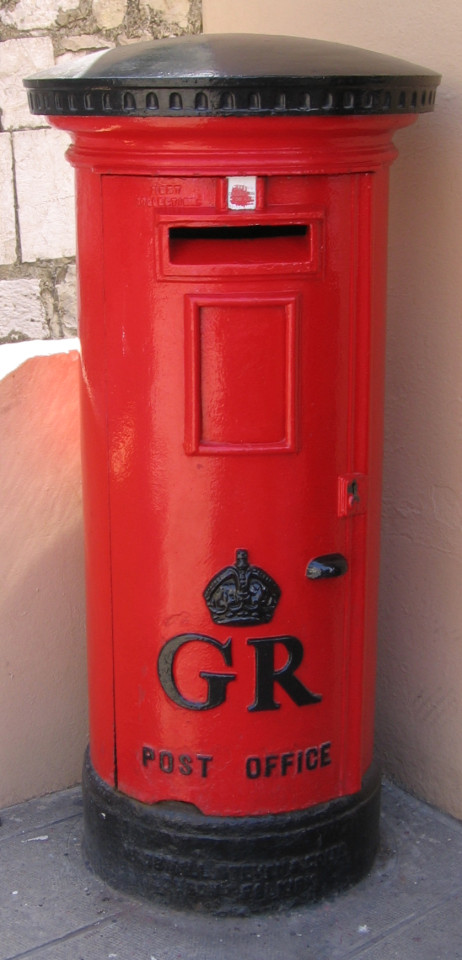
An early 20th century George V pillar box in Gibraltar

In 1886 the local colonial authorities took over control of the Gibraltar Post Office and were able to issue their own stamps. Initially they overprinted Bermuda stamps but by December they had their own design. However, they still sold Spanish stamps if required and between 1889 and 1898 the post office sold Gibraltar stamps valued in pesetas as this was the currency in circulation.

For the first fifty years, the Gibraltar Post Office had responsibility for the post office not only in Gibraltar but also for the British postal service in Morocco. This ended in 1907.

In 2005 the Gibraltar Post Office was granted the title of "Royal" by Her Majesty the Queen. Gibraltar is the only Commonwealth or British Overseas Territory post office outside the United Kingdom that bears this title. Gibraltar has traditional red pillar boxes and the tops are also frequently painted black.

The Post Office continues to provide some traditional services and was still using benefit books after they were abandoned in the United Kingdom, while there is also a special philatelic counter to sell the commemorative stamps.

The Post office provides a next day delivery service to the community with letters posted before 07:00 that day in any of the 30+ pillar boxes located in Gibraltar delivered same day. As the official designated postal operator by the UPU (Universal Postal Union) it has a universal service obligation to deliver mail to every Gibraltar resident and provide an international mail service to all UPU member countries worldwide (192 member countries)

== Services ==
The Royal Gibraltar Post Office provides the following services:

- Letter post
- Parcel post
- Airmail
- Express mail services
- Poste restante
- Post office boxes
- Registration services
- Postal orders

Banking facilities are provided through the Gibraltar Savings Bank, which is part of the Gibraltar Government services.

== Office locations ==
The Royal Gibraltar Post Office has a number of offices around Gibraltar:

- Main Office - A Victorian building which sits in Main Street.
- P.O. Boxes Unit - Irish Town
- Mail Operations Centre and Parcel Post - Unit E, Admiral Rooke Road

The North District Post Office in Glacis Road and the South District Post Office in Scud Hill were closed in late 2014 for refurbishment, but in February 2016 had still not reopened. In September of that year, the Government stated that there were no plans to reopen either Post Office; Minister Joe Bossano explained there had been a proposal to house Savings Bank outlets in the premises but that when the money generated was considered, it was found not to be financially viable.

== See also ==
- Postage stamps and postal history of Gibraltar
- Postal orders of Gibraltar
- Postal addresses in Gibraltar
