= Westside School, Gibraltar =

Westside School
- Westside

Location
- Queensway; Gibraltar
- 36.1442°N 5.3560°W

Information
- Type: Co-ed comprehensive
- Motto: Decanting and Cover
- Established: 1982
- Headmaster: CM Barabich
- Years: 7 - 13
- Gender: Co-ed
- Colour: Burgundy
- Rival: Bayside Comprehensive
- Website: www.westsideschoolgibraltar.com

Westside School or simply Westside is a comprehensive school in the British territory of Gibraltar.

The school opened in 1982, and was built in order to provide education to the students of the former Girls' Comprehensive School, previously spread over three different sites, and itself an amalgamation of four girls' schools: Loreto High School, St. Joseph's Secondary School, St. Margaret's School, and St. David's Commercial School.

It was formerly only for girls, but as of 2021 is coeducational.

== Subjects offered ==
Westside offers a range of subjects at different levels. These are at Key Stage 3 (years 7, 8 and 9), Key Stage 4 (years 10 and 11) and Sixth form (years 12 and 13). Students do their General Certificate of Secondary Education (GCSE) courses during Key Stage 4 and those who wish to further their studies from there, do their A-Levels during sixth form. Italicized subjects indicate compulsory subjects.

=== Key Stage 3 ===
- Art and design
- Drama
- English
- French
- Geography
- History
- Information and communication technology
- Mathematics
- Music
- Personal, social and health education
- Physical education
- Science
- Spanish
- Technology
- Woodwork and home economics are also included

=== Key Stage 4 ===
- Art and design
- Art and design (Textile)
- Business studies
- Child development
- Child studies (non-GCSE)
- Commercial studies (non-GCSE)
- Economics
- English language
- English literature
- Food and nutrition
- French
- Geography
- History
- Home craft (non-GCSE)
- Information and communication technology
- Mathematics
- Music
- Personal, Social and Health Education (non GCSE)
- Physical Education
- Religious Studies
- Spanish
- Combined science (formerly known as dual science)
- Triple Science (added content to dual science)

=== Sixth form ===
- Art and design
- Biology
- Business studies
- Chemistry
- Economics
- English literature
- French
- Geography
- History
- History of art
- Information and communication technology
- Liberal studies (non A-Level)
- Mathematics
- Music
- Physical education
- Physics
- Psychology (done in conjunction with the Gibraltar college on college premises*
- Religious studies and philosophy
- Religious studies (non A-level)

== Notable alumni ==
- Georgina Cassar, Team GB rhythmic gymnast (London 2012)

== See also ==
- Bayside Comprehensive School (Gibraltar)
- List of schools in Gibraltar
