= Bayside Comprehensive School =

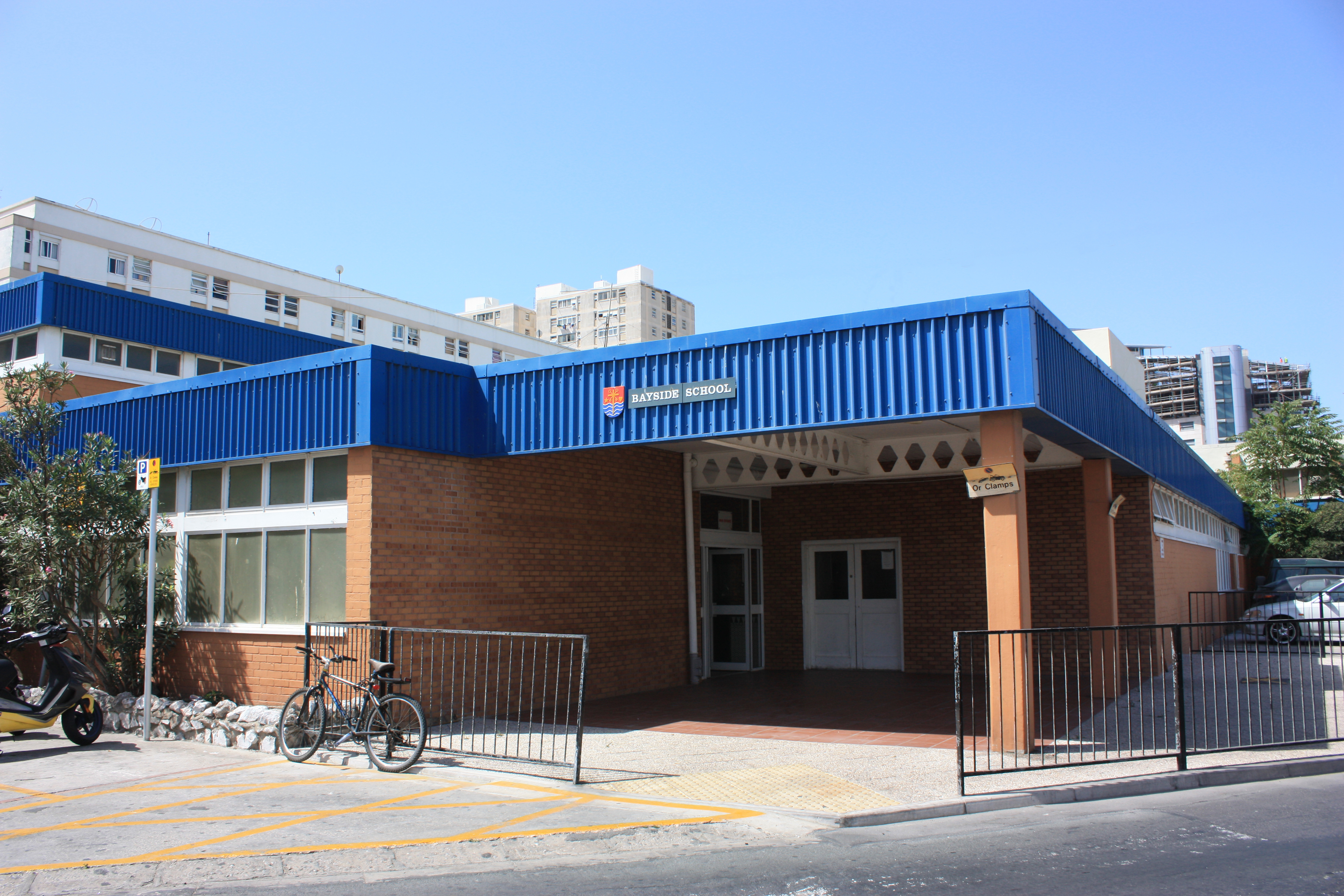

Location
- 43 North Mole Road; Gibraltar
- Coordinates: 36.148348°N 5.350978°W

Information
- Type: Comprehensive school
- Established: 1972
- Head teacher: Gaynor Lester
- Teaching staff: 65
- Gender: Mixed (formerly boys)
- Age range: 11-18
- Enrolment: Approx. 1400
- Colour: Navy blue
- Website: www.baysideschoolgibraltar.gi

Bayside Comprehensive School, or simply Bayside, is a comprehensive school in the British overseas territory of Gibraltar. It is one of three secondary schools in Gibraltar and covers year 7 to year 13 (age 11 to 18).

== History ==
Bayside was established in 1972 when the comprehensive school system was implemented in Gibraltar. Four separate schools were merged to form Bayside, the sole secondary school for boys aged 12 to 18 (year 8 to year 13). The original four schools were St. Jago's Secondary Modern, Our Lady of Lourdes Secondary Modern the Gibraltar and Dockyard Technical School and the Gibraltar Grammar School. However, it was not until 1974 that all the students from those schools were housed in the one building on the old building of Bayside.

In the September of 2019, new buildings for both Bayside and Westside opened up to new students of both genders. Bayside is now a co-ed school.

In 2024, the school was visited by Sir Lindsay Hoyle, the Speaker of the House of Commons.

== Subjects ==
Bayside offers a range of subjects at different levels. These are at Key Stage 3 (years 7, 8 and 9), Key Stage 4 (years 10 and 11) and the sixth form (years 12 and 13). Students do their General Certificates of Secondary Education (GCSEs) during Key Stage 4. Students may choose to continue into the sixth form to study A-Levels.

== Student body ==
The running of the school's student system consists of two separate parts. Firstly, there is the system of head boy, deputy head boys (two individuals) and assistant-deputy heads (four individuals, also known as Heads of House). In order for students to form part of this system, they must formally present themselves and state their interest to become head boy, or to fill in one of the other positions. After they do so, they must be elected by teachers. After teachers have considered the potential candidates they are then voted into their positions by their 6th-form colleagues. The second system of the student body is the student council which is described in the next subsection.

=== Student newspapers ===
Prior to 2009, Bayside school's student newspapers have had many titles ranging from Student world to simply Student Magazine. Over the years, these publications have been run by the students. In 2009, 6th form students looked to revitalise the undergoing tradition of having a school newspaper by introducing seasonal newsletters at different points during the year, as opposed to just one single newsletter at the end of the year. The newly branded Student Life was designed, written by and photographed by the students. In 2016, Bayside students in Year 12 created a replacement magazine in replacement called Baywatch. The magazine, run by John Peace, an English teacher at the school, is written, designed and marketed by a team of Year 12/13 (Sixth Form) students.

== See also ==
- Westside School (Gibraltar)
- List of schools in Gibraltar
