= Alcock =

Alcock is a surname. Notable people with the surname include:

- Alfred William Alcock, British naturalist
- C. W. Alcock, British sports administrator, creator of the FA Cup
- Charles R. Alcock, American astronomer
- Deborah Alcock, British author of fiction
- Edward Alcock (footballer), English footballer
- George Alcock, British astronomer
- George Alcock (footballer), English footballer
- Harry Alcock, English footballer
- James Alcock, Psychologist and noted skeptic
- John Alcock (aviator), pioneer aviator, of Alcock and Brown
- John Alcock (bishop), English bishop of the fifteenth century
- John Alcock (behavioral ecologist), American behavioral ecologist and author
- John Alcock (organist), English organist and composer
- Lara Alcock, British mathematics educator
- Leslie Alcock, British archaeologist
- Mary Alcock (c.1742 –1798), British writer
- Michael Alcock, British air chief marshal
- Milly Alcock (born 2000), Australian actress
- Nathan Alcock, British physician
- Rachel Alcock (1862–1939), English physiologist
- Reg Alcock, Canadian politician
- Ronald Alcock (died 1991), British stamp dealer and philatelic publisher
- Rutherford Alcock, British diplomat
- Siccature Alcock, birth name of Jah Cure, Jamaican reggae musician
- Terry Alcock, English footballer
- Thomas Alcock (adventurer), (died 1563), English traveller and adventurer
- Thomas Alcock (priest), (1709–1798), English clergyman, pluralist and author
- Thomas Alcock (surgeon) (1784–1833) English surgeon
- Thomas Alcock (MP) (1801–1866) British politician
- Vivien Alcock, British children's writer
- Walter Galpin Alcock, English organist and composer
- William Congreve Alcock (c.1771–1813), Irish politician from Waterford

== See also ==
- Alcott
- Aycock
- Alcock's canal
- Alcock Island, Antarctica
- Alcock v Chief Constable of South Yorkshire Police
