= Aycock =

Aycock is a surname. Notable people with the surname include:

- Alice Aycock (born 1946), American sculptor
- Angela Aycock (born 1973), American basketball player
- Charles Brantley Aycock (1859–1912), American politician
- Cora Lily Woodard Aycock (1868–1952), American political hostess
- Dale Aycock (born 1935), American author
- Dugan Aycock (1908–2001), American golfer
- Jimmie Don Aycock (born 1946), American politician
- Lucile Aycock (1919–2013), American socialite
- Roger D. Aycock (1914–2004), American author
- Sharion Aycock (born 1955), American judge
- Taddy Aycock (1915–1987), American politician
- William Brantley Aycock (1915–2015), American educator

== See also ==
- Aycock, Greensboro, North Carolina, neighbourhood
- Aycock House
