= Thomas Alcock =

Thomas Alcock may refer to:

- Thomas Alcock (adventurer) (died 1563), English adventurer
- Thomas Alcock (priest) (1709–1798), Anglican vicar, pluralist and author
- Thomas Alcock (Ordnance) (1762–1856), Treasurer of the Ordnance
- Thomas Alcock (MP) (1801–1866), Member of Parliament for Newton 1826–1830, Ludlow 1839–1840, and East Surrey 1847–1865
- Thomas Alcock (surgeon) (1784–1833), English surgeon

== See also ==
- Thomas Alcock Beck (1795–1846), author
