= Richard Garcia (Gibraltar) =

Former chief secretary of the British government

Richard Garcia MBE FRPSL is the former chief secretary of the British government in Gibraltar. He has also been chairman of the Gibraltar Police Authority and Maritime Accident Investigation Compliance Officer for Gibraltar.

Garcia is a fellow of the Royal Philatelic Society London and former president of the Gibraltar Philatelic Society.

== Selected publications ==
- The Postal History of Gibraltar. 1998. (With Ted Proud)
- The Development of the Gibraltar Picture Postcard. Government of Gibraltar, 2004.
- The British Postal Service in Morocco, 1749–1906. 2009.
- The Gibraltar Savings Bank 1882 – 2012. Gibraltar Garrison Library Press, 2012.
- Gibraltar's Currency and Banknotes 1898–2011. 2012.
- Gibraltar Through the Lens. 2013.
- Wholesome Wines and Kindred Spirits: Saccone and Speed 1839–2014. 2014.
- A Quiet Voice That Would Be Heard. 2014.
- A Mighty Fortress set in the Silver Sea. FotoGrafiks Books, 2014.
- A Tradition of Service: The Gibraltar Fire and Rescue Service, 1865–2015. Gibraltar Fire and Rescue Service, 2015.
- The Changing Face of Gibraltar in the 20th Century. 2017.
- Barroco on the Rock: George Borrow and Gibraltar. Lavengro Press, 2017.
