= Gibraltar Defence Police =

UK civil police force in Gibraltar

Coordinates: 36.14048°N 5.356641°W

- Flag of Gibraltar
- Common name: Defence Police
- Abbreviation: GDP

Agency overview
- Formed: 2009
- Employees: 143 (with 100 officers reported as of 2023)

Jurisdictional structure
- Operations jurisdiction: GIB
- Area: 6.8km^{2}
- Population: 32,194 (2015)
- Legal jurisdiction: Gibraltar
- Governing body: Ministry of Defence
- General nature: Local civilian police

Operational structure
- Headquarters: Northgate House, HM Naval Base, Gibraltar
- Sworn members: 95
- Unsworn members: 50
- Agency executive: John McVea, Chief of Police

Facilities
- Patrol cars: Yes
- Motor patrol boats: 2 (15-metre)
- Rigid-hulled inflatable boats: 2 (Arctic 24)
- Police dogs: Yes

The Gibraltar Defence Police (GDP) is a civil police force which provides a policing and security service for the Ministry of Defence in Gibraltar. Prior to 17 December 2009 it was known as the Gibraltar Services Police (GSP).

== Overview ==
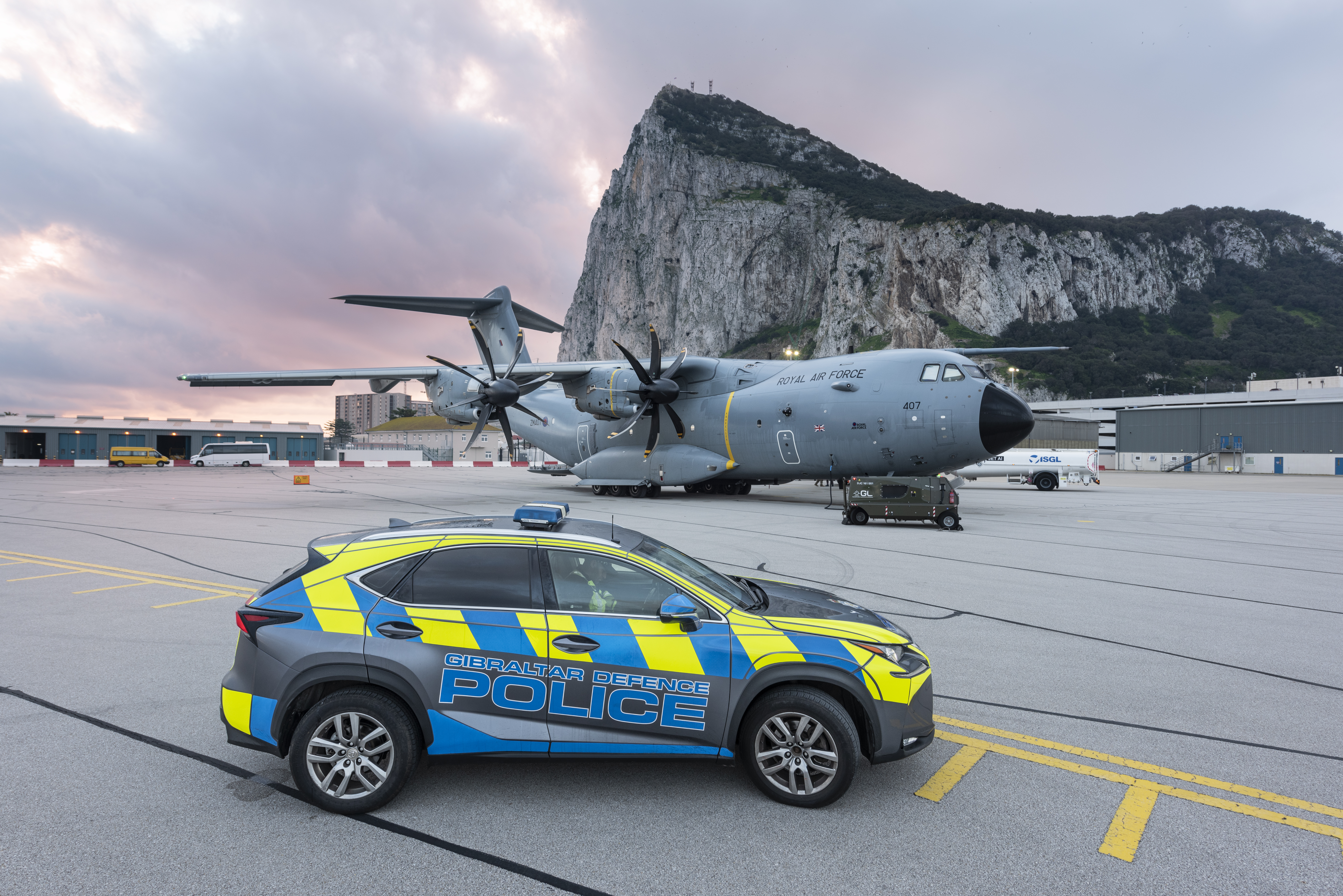
GDP vehicle and a Royal Air Force A400M Atlas at RAF Gibraltar in 2021

The Gibraltar Defence Police is one of three civilian police forces within the UK Ministry of Defence. Officers are sworn under the Police Act of the Laws of Gibraltar. The Chief of Police is currently John McVea. An independent civilian police force which also provides civilian unarmed guards, the Chief of Police is responsible to the Commander, British Forces Gibraltar.

=== Structure ===
In 2020, the strength of the force was said to be: one chief of police, one deputy chief of police, two chief inspectors, five inspectors, 14 sergeants, 72 constables, together with civilian support staff and uniformed guards.

As of 2023, the total strength of the force was said to be about 100 officers.

=== Headquarters ===
Since 2016 the GDP has shared a purpose-built headquarters with the British Armed Forces Joint Provost and Security Unit (JPSU) (military police) at HM Naval Base Gibraltar.

=== Pay and conditions ===
Pay and conditions of the force are identical to those of the Ministry of Defence Police (MDP) in the United Kingdom, of which it is a direct equivalent. The Gibraltar Defence Police Federation represents the interests of police officers up to the rank of chief inspector.

== Specialist units ==
=== Firearms ===
There is no specialist firearms unit. Like the MDP, all GDP officers are trained in the use of firearms.

=== Marine unit ===
The force has a Marine Unit, founded in 1990, which consists of a sergeant and over 20 constables. It is charged with the seaward defence of Gibraltar's Royal Navy facilities and the warships moored in them, and also assists the Royal Gibraltar Police Marine Section with general security and enforcement patrols of waters surrounding Gibraltar. It operates two motor launches and two rigid-hulled inflatable boats (RHIBs). The original 10-metre (33 ft) motor launches of 1998 were replaced in 2003 with larger and faster 15-metre (49 ft) launches. One of these was itself replaced with a newer boat in 2012.

In 2021, the Ministry of Defence contracted with Marine Specialised Technology to build 16 new patrol boats for the Ministry of Defence Police and a further two specifically for the Gibraltar Defence Police. The new 15m boats, which are replacing the existing vessels, have a crew of three (plus room for four more passengers), a top speed of 30 knots and are fitted with both ballistic protection and CCTV surveillance systems. Delivery of the vessels was expected to begin in July 2022.

The RHIBs are Arctic 24 type boats, capable of speeds up to 55 knots (102 km/h; 63 mph). Since 2011, the police marine unit has shared a headquarters and boathouse with the Gibraltar Squadron of the Royal Navy. The boathouse holds the Navy's five patrol boats and RHIBs, and the police's four patrol boats and RHIBs.

=== Dog section ===
The GDP dog section was formed in 2012, and consists of a team of handlers, led by a sergeant, and six general purpose dogs. The initial six dogs are of the Belgian Shepherd Dog (Malinois) and Dutch Shepherd Dog breeds. The GDP previously relied on service dogs and handlers seconded from United Kingdom police forces, but as part of the GDP Project Euston, which seeks to replace all secondment from UK forces with locally provided Gibraltarian services, the GDP dog section has been established.

=== Drugs intelligence ===
The force seconds officers to the Gibraltar Co-ordinating Centre for Criminal Intelligence and Drugs (GCID).

== Ranks ==
The rank structure of the GDP follows other British police forces, with ranks from chief officer down to constable.

Gibraltar Defence Police ranks and insignia
Rank	Chief of police	Deputy chief of police	Chief inspector	Inspector	Sergeant	Constable
Epaulette insignia						

== Gallery ==
A collection of photographs of the GDP:

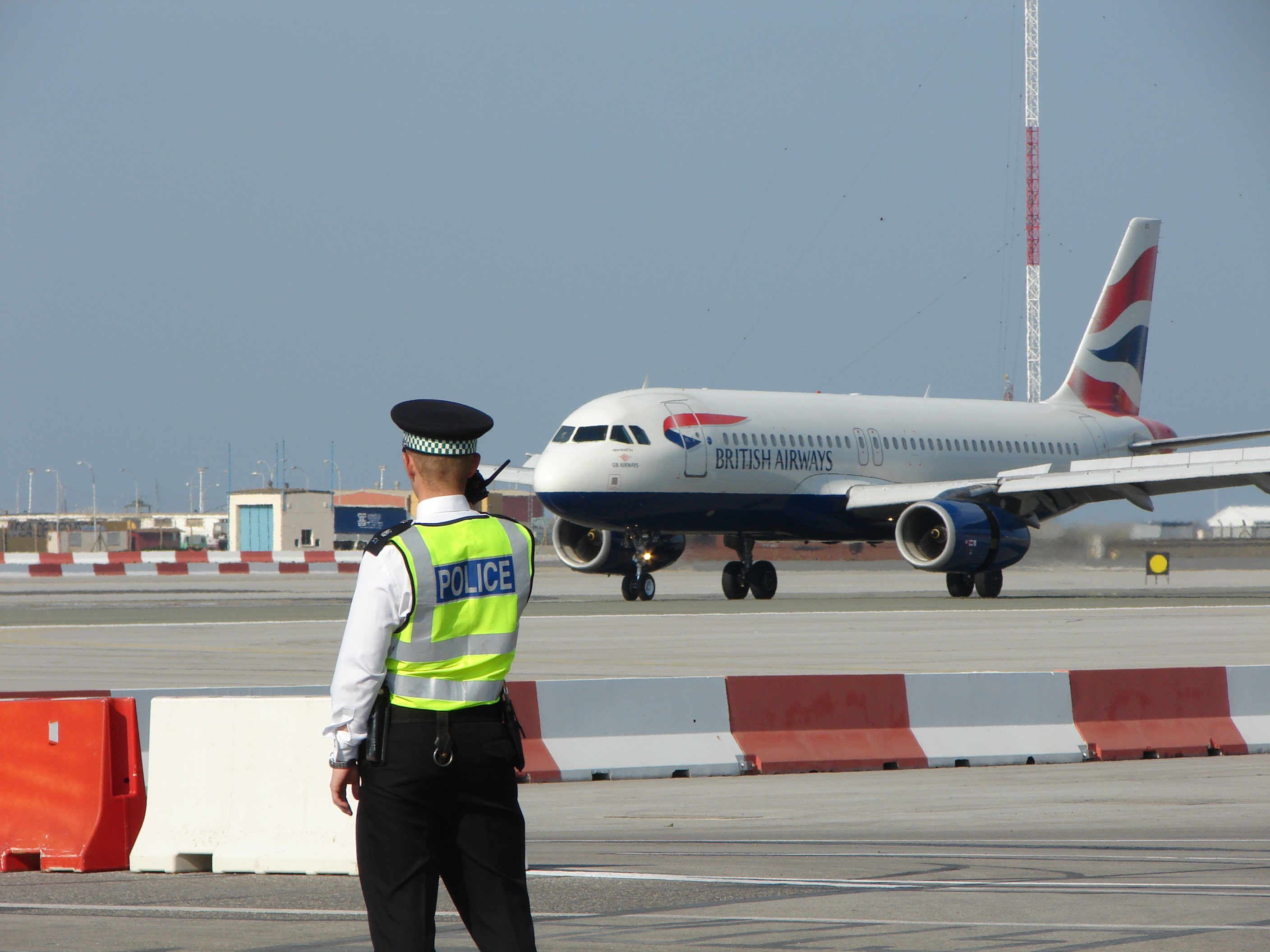
GDP officer

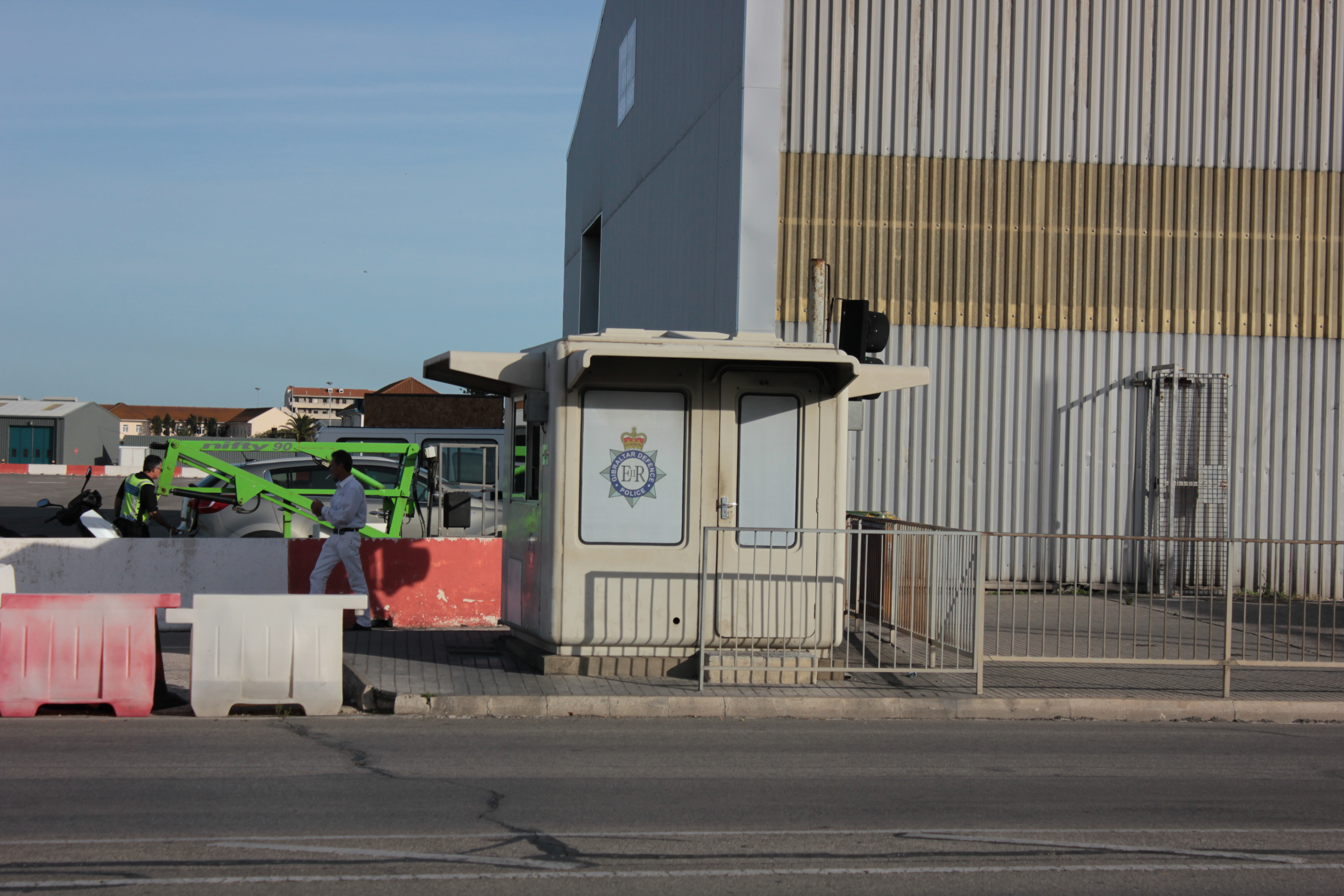
Gibraltar Defence Police shed at runway crossing

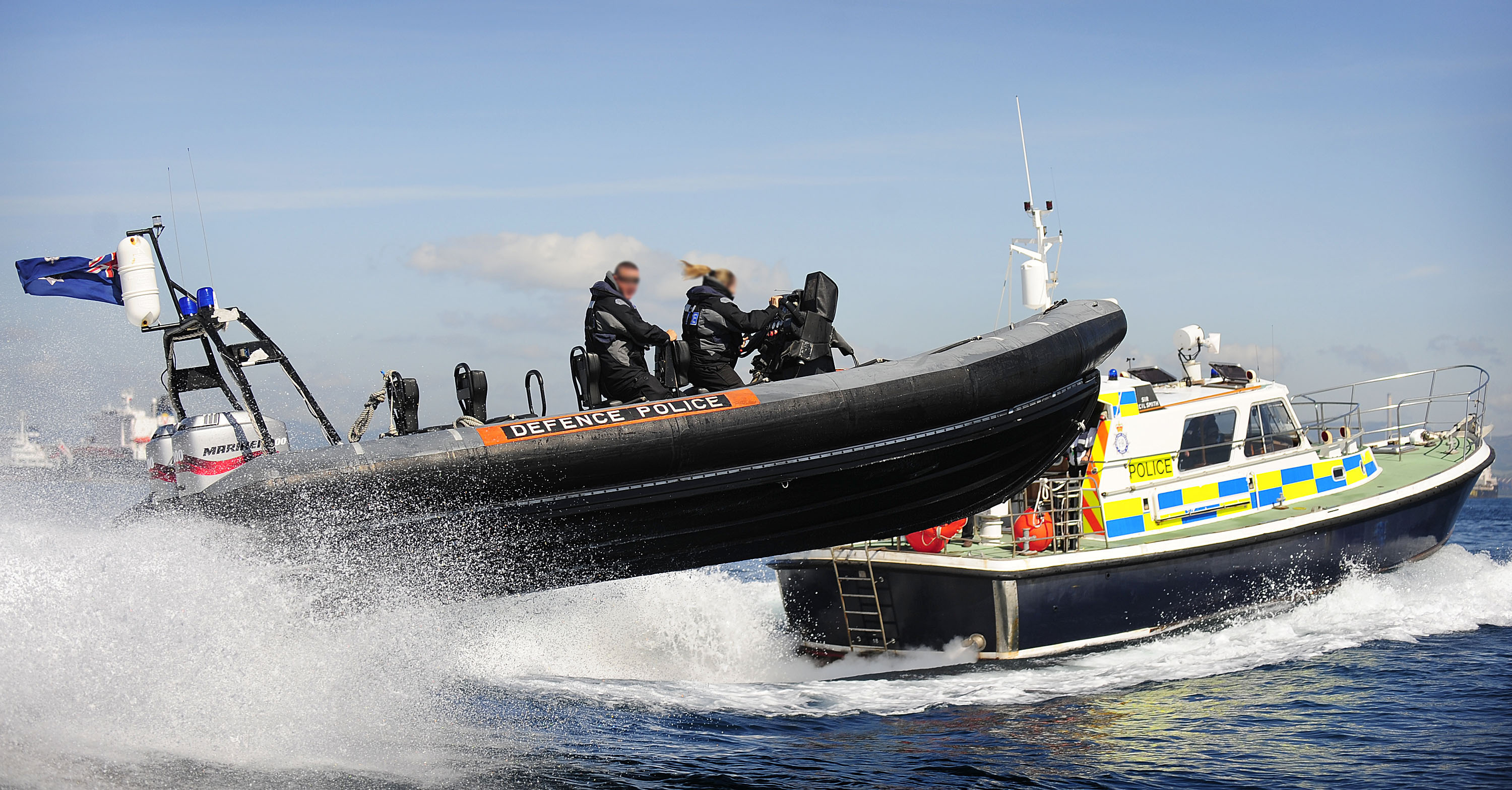
An Arctic 24 Rigid Hulled Inflatable Boat (RHIB) and the police launch 'Sir Evan Gibb', both of the Gibraltar Defence Police Marine Unit are pictured at speed in the Bay of Gibraltar.

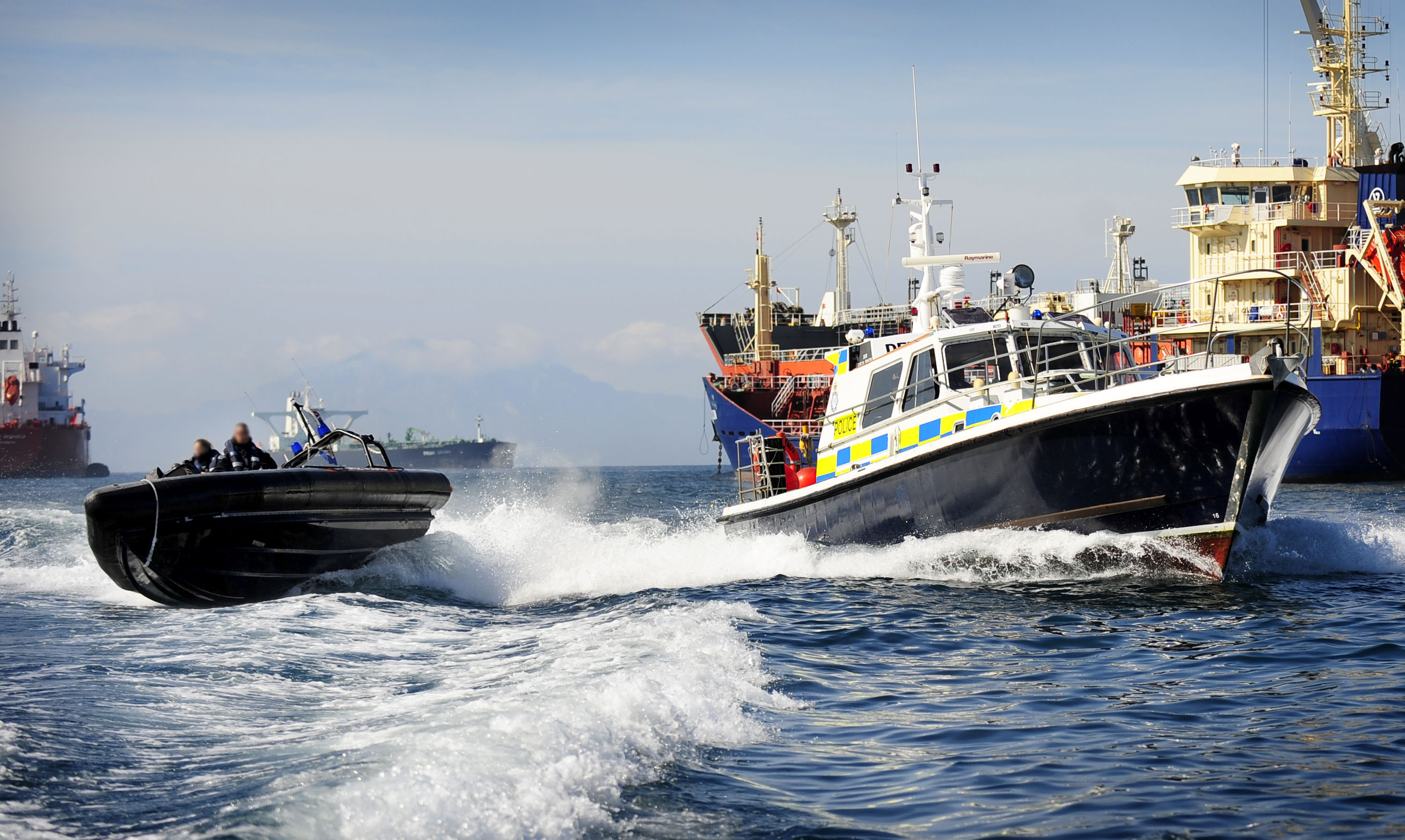
The same boats, but with a view from the front

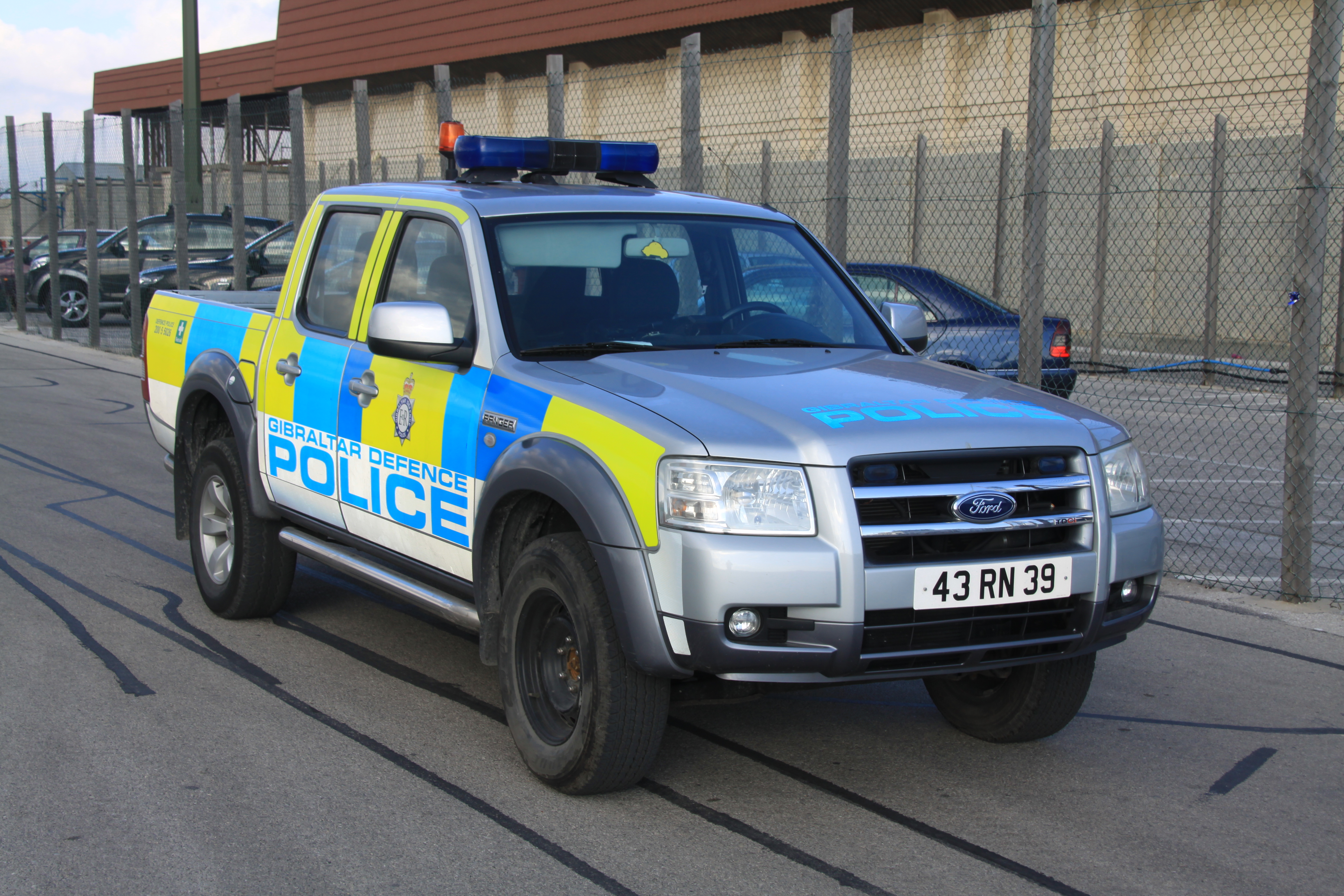
Gibraltar Police 4x4, notice the naval ('RN') number plate - all GDP vehicles carry military number plates

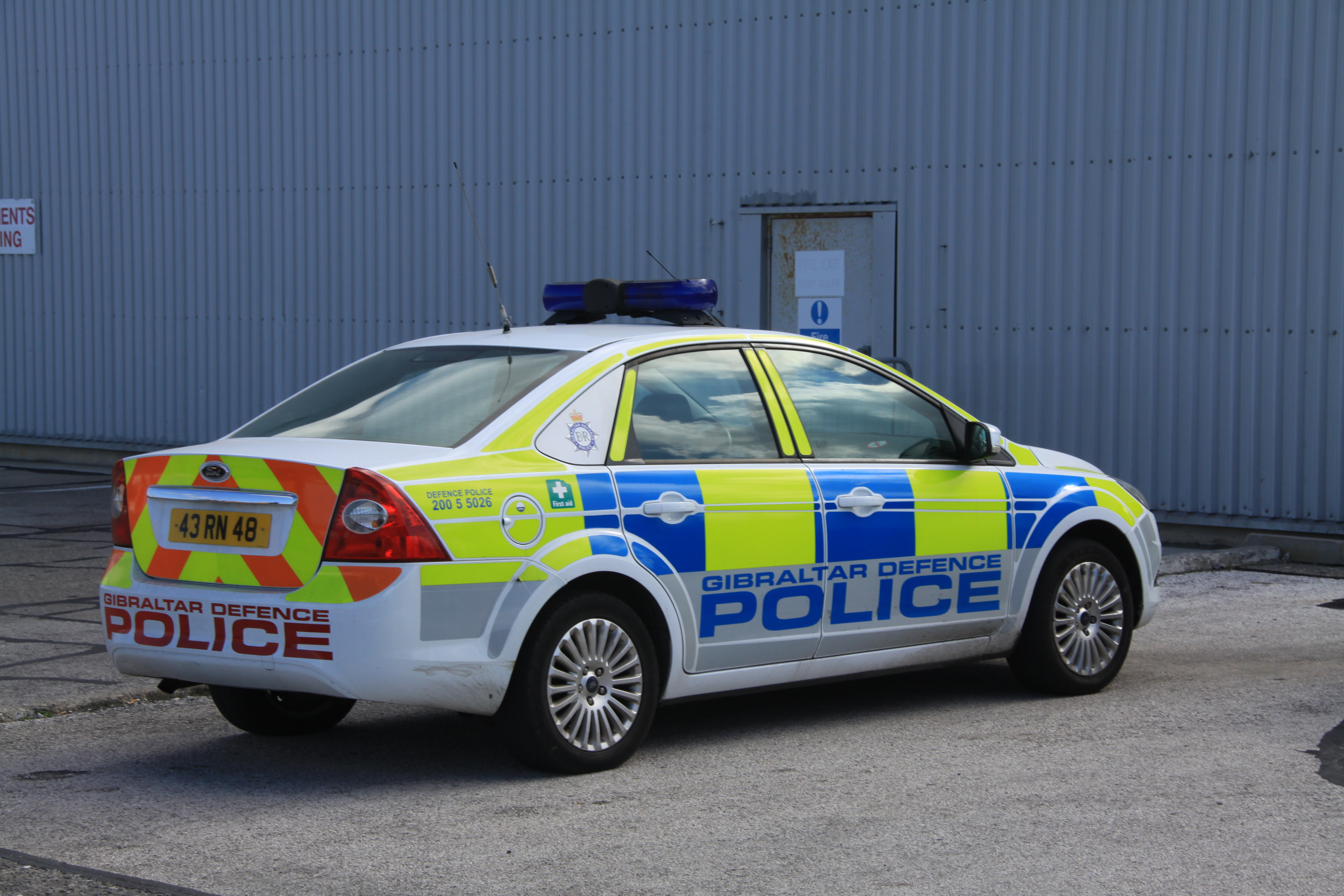
Gibraltar Police Ford police car

== See also ==
- Royal Gibraltar Police
- His Majesty's Customs (Gibraltar)
- Border and Coastguard Agency (Gibraltar)
- Law of Gibraltar
- British Overseas Territories
- List of law enforcement agencies in the United Kingdom, Crown Dependencies and British Overseas Territories
