= Stardrifter (novel) =

1981 novel by Dale Aycock

Stardrifter is a novel by Dale Aycock published in 1981.

== Plot summary ==
Stardrifter is a novel in which the owner of an interstellar trading company gets caught up in a conspiracy that is looking to rule the galaxy.

== Reception ==
Greg Costikyan reviewed Star Drifter in Ares Magazine #10 and commented that "The importance is not the plot, which is typical space opera, but Aycock's ability to flesh out characters despite slam-bang action and to turn a pretty phrase or two. Star Drifter is fun reading."

The book also received reviews from Voice of Youth Advocates and Gene DeWeese of Science Fiction Review.

== Reviews ==
- Review by Gene DeWeese (1981) in Science Fiction Review, Winter 1981
