= His Majesty's Customs (Gibraltar) =

Customs and import authority in Gibraltar

- The logo of HM Customs Gibraltar

- The flag of Gibraltar
- Common name: HM Customs

Agency overview
- Formed: 14 May 1750

Jurisdictional structure
- Operations jurisdiction: Gibraltar
- HM Customs' jurisdiction (beige)
- Area: 6.8 km²
- Population: 34,000
- Legal jurisdiction: As per operations jurisdiction
- Governing body: Government of Gibraltar, Ministry of Finance
- General nature: Local civilian police
- Specialist jurisdiction: Customs, excise, gambling

Operational structure
- Headquarters: Customs House, Waterport
- Agency executive: John Payas, Collector of Customs
- Parent agency: Ministry of Finance

Facilities
- Prisons: His Majesty's Prison, Gibraltar
- Patrol cars: Yes
- Vans: Yes
- RIBs: Yes
- Dogs: Yes

Website
- www.hmcustoms.gov.gi

His Majesty's Customs are the primary customs and import authority in the British Overseas Territory of Gibraltar. It is a uniformed, enforcement body, controlled by the Ministry of Finance, Government of Gibraltar. The customs officers check commercial goods and ordinary people entering with possessions into the territory.

== Duties ==
The main purpose of HM Customs Gibraltar is to carry out customs duties at the entry points to the territory, search for suspected illegal weapons, drugs or goods, carry out basic good-import checks and requirements. To this end, both fixed posts and patrols are used.

In May 2020, they celebrated their 270 years of existence with a parade at No. 6 Convent Place and their headquarters.

=== Collector of Customs ===
The Collector of Customs is the most senior customs officer and is responsible for the day-to-day leadership of the organisation.

== Uniform ==
Customs officers, up to and including the Collector of Customs, wear a traditional British customs uniform.

The symbol of HM Customs is a portcullis, surrounded by a wreath and surmounted by a crown, representing their authority and the monarch.

For men this includes:

Formal dress:

- a white-topped peaked cap with capbadge
- white long sleeve shirt
- black tie
- Naval blue tunic (Reefer jacket) with rank sewn on to both cuffs
- dark blue trousers
- black formal shoes
- white gloves

Day dress:

- a white-topped peaked cap with capbadge
- white long-sleeve or short sleeve shirt
- black tie
- black trousers
- black boots or shoes
- black jacket
- high-visibility equipment vest and rank worn on rank slides on the shoulders of shirts, jackets and vests.

Marine dress:

- blue baseball cap with Customs logo on front
- black trousers with leg-pockets
- dark blue polo top with Customs logo on left breast
- blue jacket, high-visibility equipment vest and rank worn on rank slides on the shoulders of shirts, jackets and vests
- life jacket.

For women this includes; the same as above apart from the fact that the white-topped female bowler cap with capbadge and black capband is worn instead of the males' peaked cap. A skirt may also be worn in lieu of trousers, in formal dress.

All medals and decorations (including medal ribbons whilst not on parade) are to be worn on the left side of the tunic.

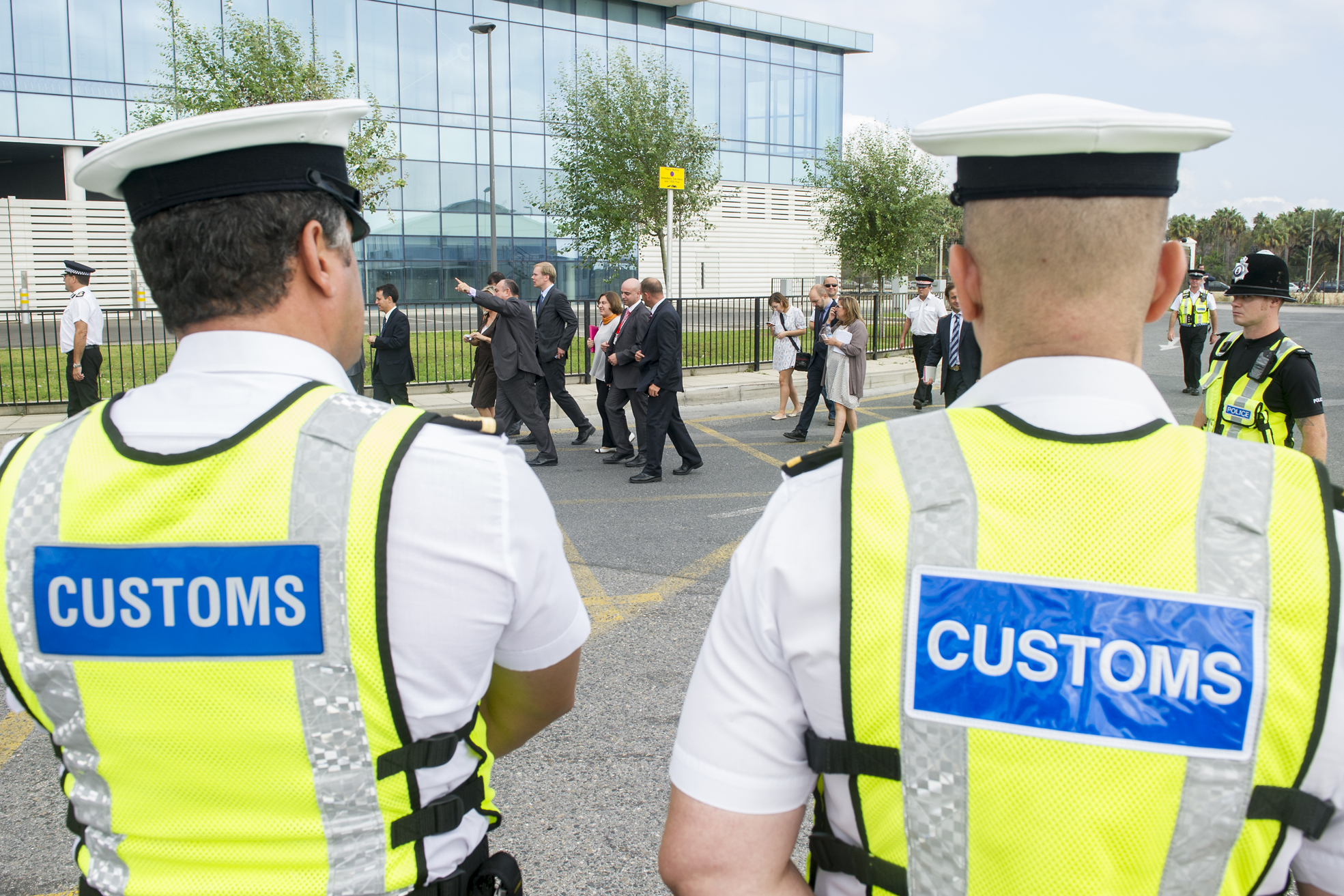
HM Customs officers on duty, note the rank worn underneath the vest

== Rank structure ==
The rank structure follows the UK HM Customs rank structure.

His Majesty's Customs and Excise rank insignia
Rank	Customs Officer	Executive Customs Officer	Senior Customs Officer	Assistant Collector	Collector of Customs
Abbreviation	CO	ECO	SCO	ASC	COC
Insignia					

== Transport ==
HM Customs have marked road vehicles for customs duties, fitted with blue flashing lights and sirens. The current vehicles are dark blue, with blue and yellow markings and the HM Customs crest as well as appropriate wording.

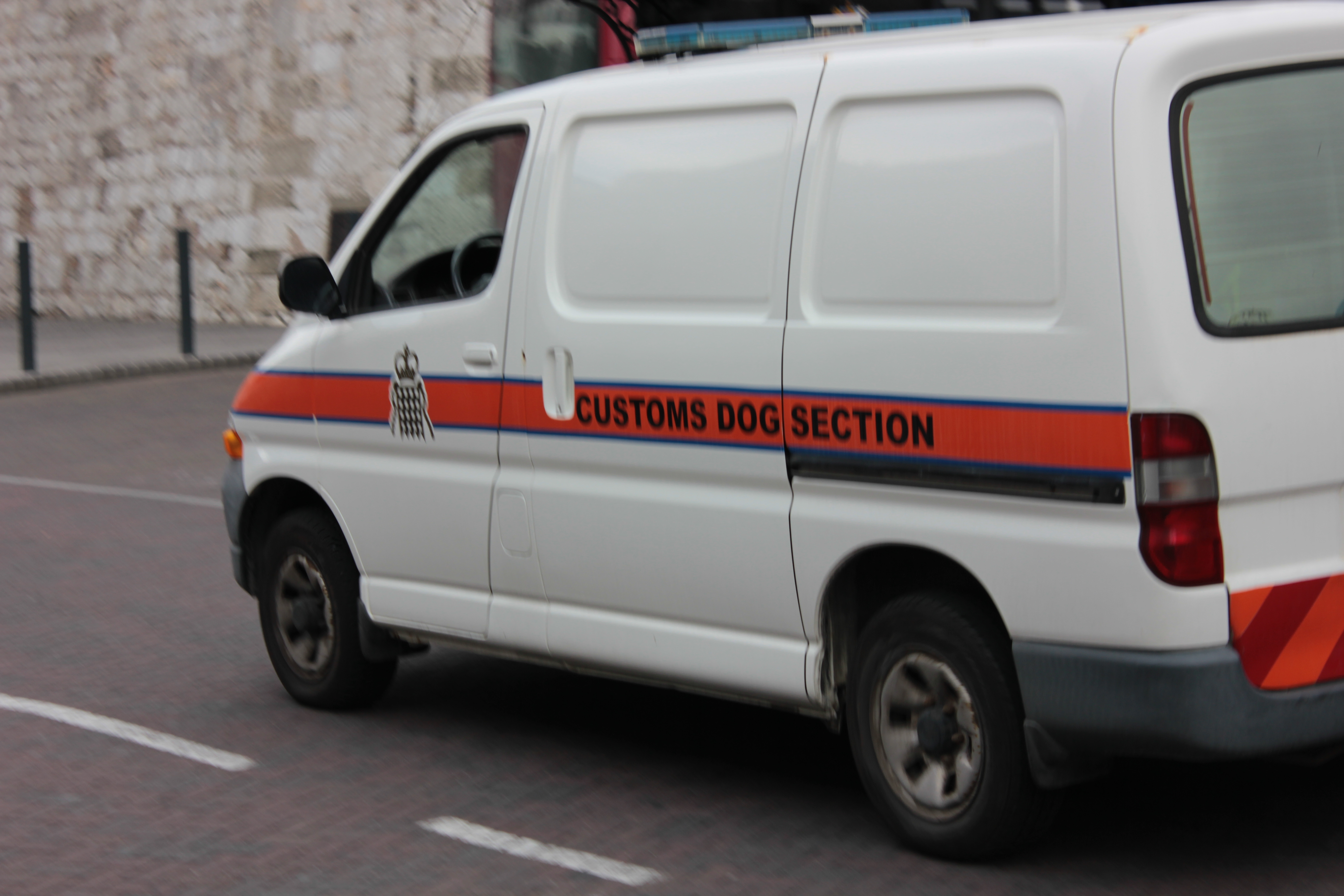
Gibraltar Customs dog van in the former livery

== HM Customs Marine Section ==
The Customs of Gibraltar operate a Marine Unit, which operates two-high speed RIBs. The Maritime Journal reported that "Performance patrol boat specialist FB Design has recently delivered two high speed RIBs to HM Customs in Gibraltar. Capable of speeds of over 50 knots these two RIBs are based on standard production hull designs developed by this Italian builder, but they have been fully customised to meet the requirements of the Customs".

HM Customs does carry out counter-drug operations, sometimes in conjunction with the Royal Gibraltar Police and Spanish Guardia Civil. HM Customs seizes illegal drugs and carries out deterrence operations.

== Social media ==
HM Customs Gibraltar have a Twitter account, Facebook Page and LinkedIn Profile.

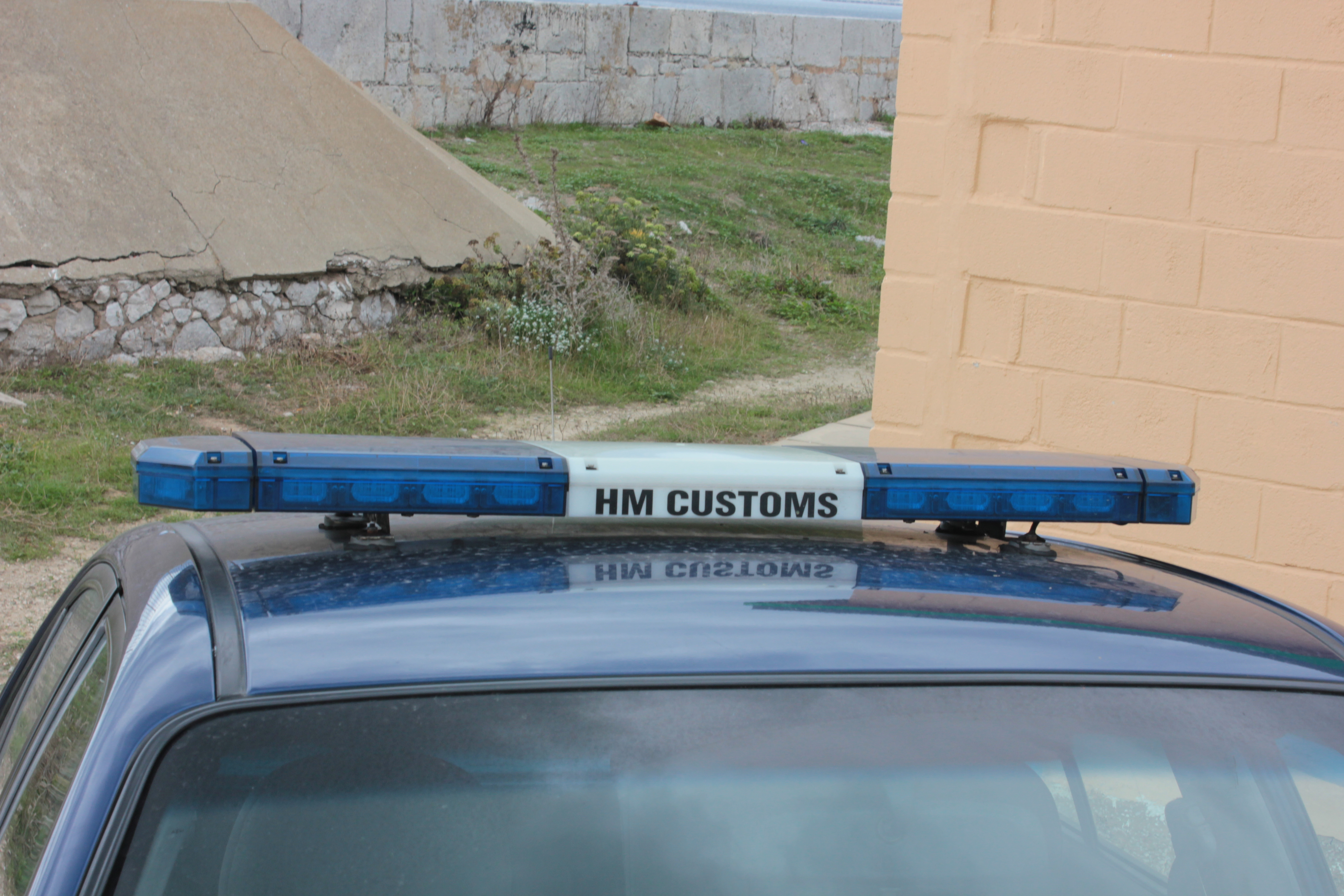
An example of the blue flashing light bar on a HM Gibraltar Customs Hyundai Accent

== See also ==
- Gibraltar Defence Police
- Royal Gibraltar Police
- Border and Coastguard Agency (Gibraltar)
- Law of Gibraltar
