= Ted Proud =

Ted Proud

Edward Wilfrid Baxby (Ted) Proud (18 April 1930 – 6 February 2017) was a British postal historian, philatelic writer, and philatelic dealer who signed the Roll of Distinguished Philatelists in 2008.

== Early life and family ==
Ted Proud was born on 18 April 1930. His birth was registered in the Willesden district of London. Baxby was his mother's maiden name.

Proud married twice, firstly to Doreen J. Dolley in Bromley, Kent, in 1951, and secondly to Karoline Ulrike Springer in Westminster, London, in 1966. He had seven children by his first marriage, and four by his second.

== Philately ==
Proud founded the Proud-Bailey Company Limited in 1961 through which he published handbooks covering the postal history of over eighty different British colonies and which illustrate more than 50,000 postal markings. Proud-Bailey became a major postal history dealer. He sold the firm to Stanley Gibbons in March 1987, as a result of which he became joint deputy-chairman of that firm. The consideration for the sale was £1.6m, satisfied by the issue of 13 million new ordinary 10p shares in Stanley Gibbons at 12.25p each.

He was a past president of the International Federation of Stamp Dealers Associations and was the founder of Postal History International magazine in 1972. He was on the council of the Philatelic Traders Society. He won a gold medal for his display of Aden at Espana 2004 and exhibited "India used in Malaya" in the Court of Honour at Singapore. In 2005, he won the Webb Cup from the Hong Kong Study Circle for his work The Postal History of Hong Kong 1841-1997.

In 2008, he was invited to sign the Roll of Distinguished Philatelists.

== Death and legacy ==
Proud died on 6 February 2017. He received an obituary from Patrick Pearson in The London Philatelist. The copyright to his books was owned by a charity known as the International Postal Museum which also owned the copyright to the works of Ronald Alcock, both of which were given to the Royal Philatelic Society London after Proud's death along with the stock of unsold books, his research information and the cash funds of the charity.

== Selected publications ==
Proud wrote and published handbooks in three principal series along with a selection of other works and one non-philatelic book on S.M.S.Emden. In some cases, he was the co-author.

=== Commonwealth Military Postal History Series ===
- History of the Australian Military Postal Services 1914-1950
- History of the New Zealand Military Postal Services 1845-1991

=== General Postal History Series ===
- British Post Offices in the Far East
- British Airmails
- British Maritime Mail (4 vols.)
- Postmarks of the Date Impression Books Post Office Records

=== Postal History of the British Colonies Series ===
- The Postal History of British Palestine, 1918-48, 1985. ISBN 1-872465-05-6
- The Postal History of British Borneo, 1987. ISBN 1-872465-01-3
- The Postal History of Kenya, 1992. ISBN 1-872465-12-9
- The Postal History of Nigeria, 1995. ISBN 1-872465-17-X
- The Postal History of Gold Coast, 1995. ISBN 1-872465-16-1
- The Postal History of Basutoland and Bechuanaland Protectorate, 1996. ISBN 1-872465-11-0
- The Postal History of Northern Rhodesia, 1997. ISBN 1-872465-21-8
- The Postal History of Southern Rhodesia, 1997. ISBN 1-872465-22-6
- The Postal History of British Honduras, 1999. ISBN 1-872465-27-7
- The Postal History of Malta, 1999. ISBN 1-872465-31-5
- The Postal History of British Guiana, 2000. ISBN 1-872465-26-9
- The Postal History of Ascension, St Helena and Tristan Da Cunha, 2005. ISBN 1-872465-33-1
- The Postal History of Aden and Somaliland Protectorate, new edition 2005. ISBN 1-872465-41-2
- The Postal History of Malaya Vol.1 Straits Settlements, 2nd edition 2000, ISBN 1-872465-35-8
- The Postal History of Malaya Vol.2 Federated Malay States, 2nd edition 2000, ISBN 1-872465-40-4

=== Other ===
- Penny Black Plates. Proud-Bailey, Heathfield, 1985.
- Triple Odyssey: The Story of S.M.S.Emden and Her Crew. Proud-Bailey, 2003. ISBN 978-1872465807
