= Royal Gibraltar Police =

Police force

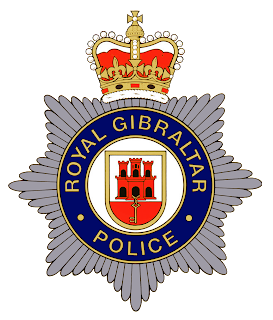
- Abbreviation: RGP

Agency overview
- Formed: 25 June 1830
- Preceding agency: Gibraltar Police
- Employees: 250 approx.

Jurisdictional structure
- Operations jurisdiction: Gibraltar
- Area: 6.8 km²
- Population: 34,000
- Legal jurisdiction: As per operations jurisdiction
- Governing body: Government of Gibraltar
- General nature: Civilian police

Operational structure
- Headquarters: New Mole House Police Station, Rosia Road, Gibraltar
- Royal appointee responsible: Lieutenant General Sir Ben Bathurst, Governor of Gibraltar
- Agency executives: Owain Richards, Commissioner; Mark Wyan, Assistant commissioner; Paul Chipolina, Superintendent - Head of Operations Division; Alex Enriles, Superintendent - Professionalism Division

Facilities
- Stations: 2: New Mole House, Rosia Road; Casemates square
- Prisons: His Majesty's Prison, Gibraltar
- Patrol cars: Yes
- Armed response vehicles: Yes
- Dogs: No

Website
- Royal Gibraltar Police

The Royal Gibraltar Police (RGP) is, along with His Majesty's Customs (Gibraltar), the principal civilian law enforcement agency in the British overseas territory of Gibraltar. It is the oldest police force in the Commonwealth of Nations outside the United Kingdom.

The Royal Gibraltar Police, previously the Gibraltar Police Force, was formed in 1830, only nine months after Sir Robert Peel founded the Metropolitan Police in London. It was Peel who sent one of his officers to Gibraltar to form the Gibraltar Police Force. The force was granted the "Royal" prefix by Queen Elizabeth II in 1992.

The force works with the Gibraltar Defence Police (GDP), His Majesty's Customs (Gibraltar), Border and Coastguard Agency (Gibraltar), His Majesty's Prison Service and the military Joint Provost and Security Unit. The force is accountable to the Gibraltar Police Authority, an independent body that is responsible for ensuring the efficiency and effectiveness of the force, and handles complaints made against officers of the force.

== Personnel strength and deployment ==
The force, referred to locally as the RGP, currently numbers around 250 officers. It is divided into a number of units, including CID, Drug Squad, Special Branch, Firearms Unit, Scene of Crime Examiners, Traffic Department, Marine Section and the Operations Division.

From its inception, up until 1999 when St. John Ambulance Brigade took over, the Gibraltar Police provided the territory's only emergency ambulance service, using officers seconded from the Operations Division. The RGP also acted as immigration officers at all entry points until the early 1990s.

The current headquarters is at New Mole House Police Station, Rosia Road. The Previous HQ used to be at 120 Irish Town. There are plans to turn this into a Police Museum. There is a sub-station at Casemates Square.

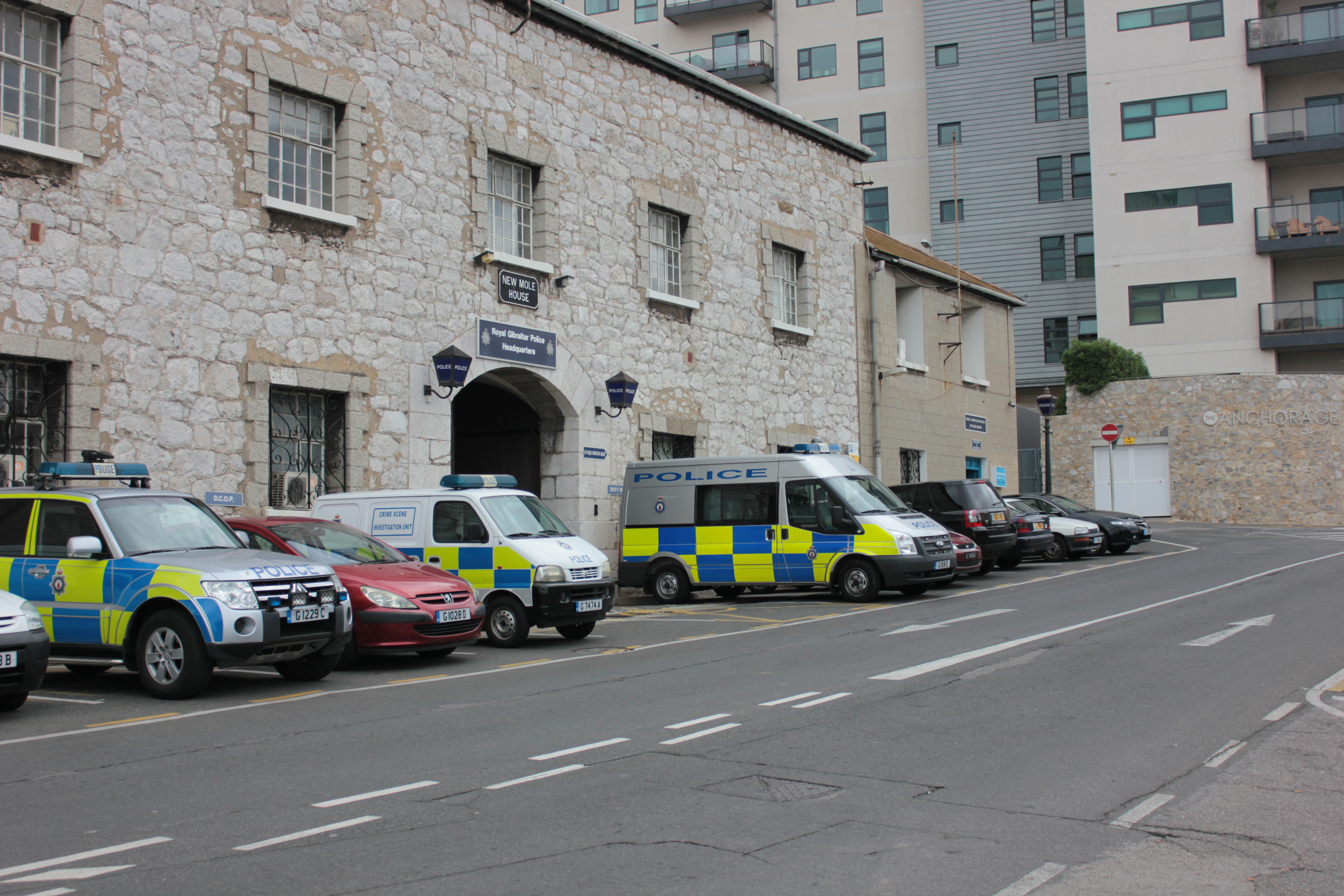
New Mole House, Royal Gibraltar Police headquarters

== Uniform ==
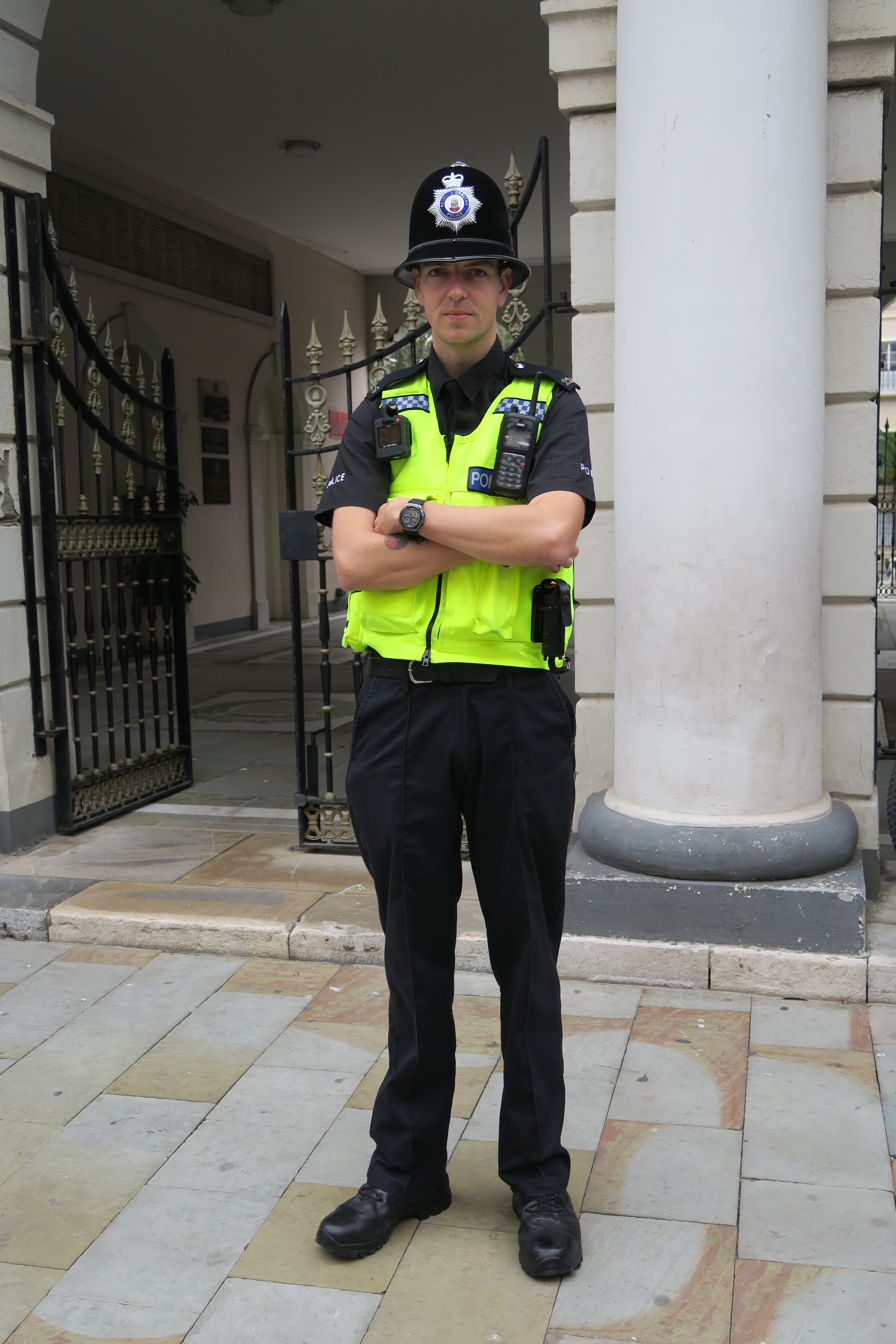
Officer with a custodian helmet

In general the uniformed officers of the Gibraltar force follow British police models in their dress. On foot patrol, male constables and sergeants, like their counterparts in England and Wales, Jersey, Guernsey, the Isle of Man and Bermuda, wear the traditional headgear of the "bobby on the beat", correctly known as the "custodian helmet", which is similar to some Army helmets and was adopted by the Metropolitan Police in London in 1863 to replace the top hat formerly worn, other forces then following suit. The helmet is traditionally made of cork covered outside by felt or serge-like material that matches the tunic.

As in many police forces in England and Wales, the Brunswick star is used as the basis for the force badge, with a central device representing Gibraltar. The badge appears also as the helmet plate.

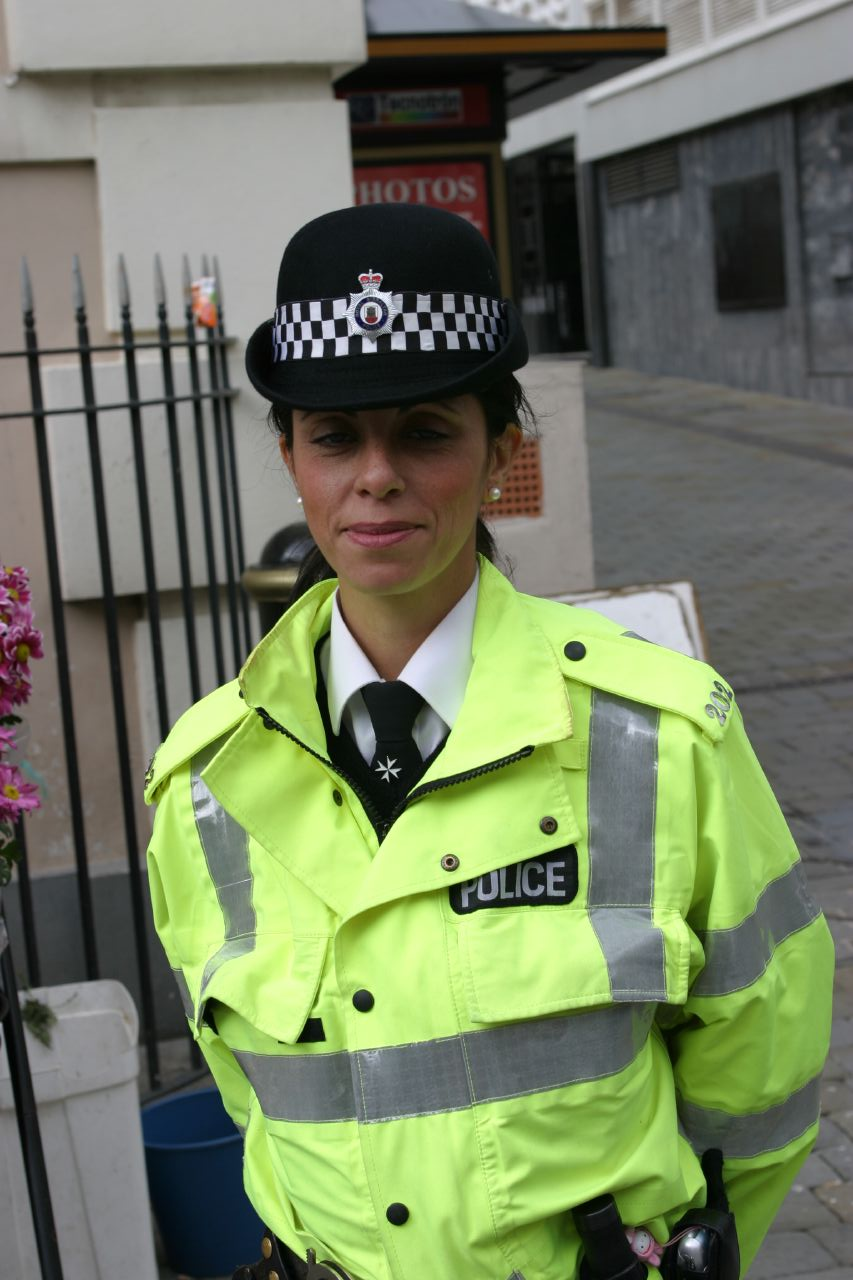
Female uniformed police officer

== Rank structure ==
The RGP rank structure follows the usual UK police pattern, but with fewer ranks. The chief police officer titled the Commissioner of Police. The RGP ranks consist of:

Royal Gibraltar Police ranks and insignia
Rank	Commissioner	Assistant commissioner	Superintendent	Chief inspector	Inspector	Crown Sergeant	Sergeant	Constable
Epaulette insignia								

The rank of Chief Superintendent was a rank introduced in 2014 replacing the rank of Assistant commissioner, which has acted as the deputy to the commissioner and as the force's second-in-command. This decision was reverted in 2018 by the force's new Commissioner Ian McGrail, who believed that the designation was not representative of the post’s position. The appointment of Senior Sergeant was introduced a month after the re-introduction of the rank of Assistant Commissioner. This appointment is held by leaders of the response teams in operational response, which the appointment came with additional responsibilities. Sergeants designated with the appointment are entitled to wear the insiginia of sergeant's chevrons with a crown on top. The rank title was later at some point replaced with Crown Sergeant.

== RGP Marine Section ==
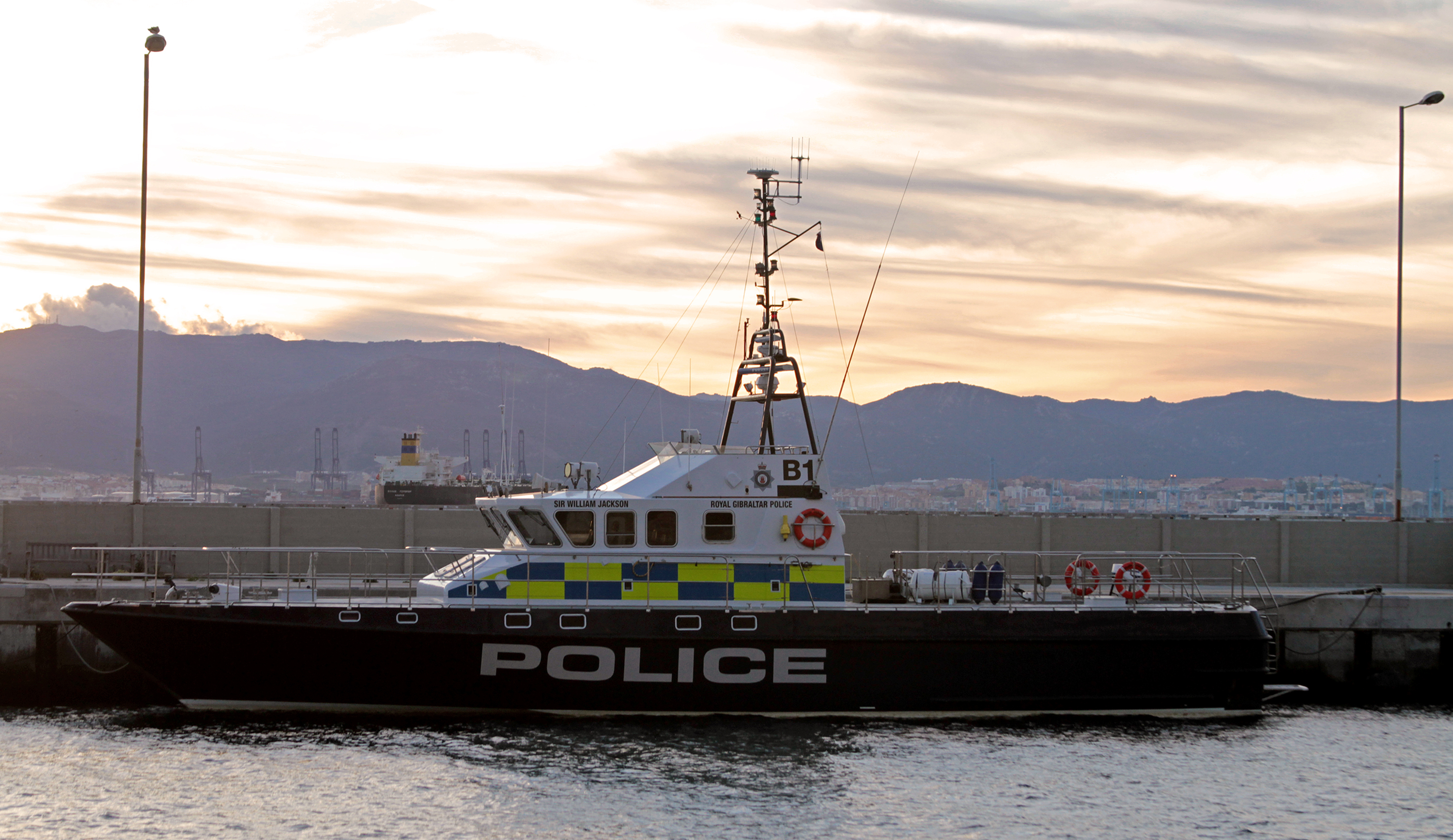
Vessel of the Royal Gibraltar Police Marine Section Sir William Jackson

The Royal Navy Base houses a facility which is jointly used by the marine sections of The Royal Gibraltar Police and the Gibraltar Defence Police. Since 2012 there have been many new additions to the unit including jet skis and larger vessels.

The role of the RGP Marine Section is to enforce the law in British Gibraltar Territorial Waters and this often includes co-operation with other local and international agencies. The RGP Marine Section plays a vital role in anti-drug smuggling operations for the local area.

Vessels of the Royal Gibraltar Police Marine Section:

- Sir Joshua Hassan
- Sir Francis Richards
- Sir John Chapple

== Chief of Police 1830 to 1937. As from 1937 Commissioner of Police ==
- 1830 H. Morgan
- 1859 C. Armstrong
- 1870 G.F. Stohelin
- 1875 S. Blair
- 1882 W.F. Cottrell
- 1883 W. Seed
- 1895 J.L. Bennet
- 1911 J. Cochrane
- 1927 W.S. Gulloch
- 1937 D.S. Gowing
- 1953 A.L. Abraham MVO.
- 1960 P.G. Owen
- 1962 L. Hannon MBE.
- 1968 J.D.O. Bird QPM.
- 1975 R.B. Gordon QPM.
- 1975 R.S. Williams
- 1980 M. Rowling
- 1984 Joseph C. Morello OBE CPM.
- 1987 Joseph L. Canepa CPM.
- 1997 Alan J. Castree QPM
- 2001 Joseph Ullger QPM CPM
- 2006 Louis Wink OBE CPM
- 2012 Edward Yome CPM
- 2018 Ian McGrail
- 2020 Richard Ullger
- 2025 Owain Richards

== Equipment ==
RGP officers employ a wide variety of equipment for police work, such as motor vehicles, sea vessels, arrest equipment and radios. Vehicles carry the UK police 'battenburg' style livery, with blue flashing lights and sirens. Unlike the UK, however, these are left hand drive vehicles, as traffic in Gibraltar drives on the right.

== Gallery ==
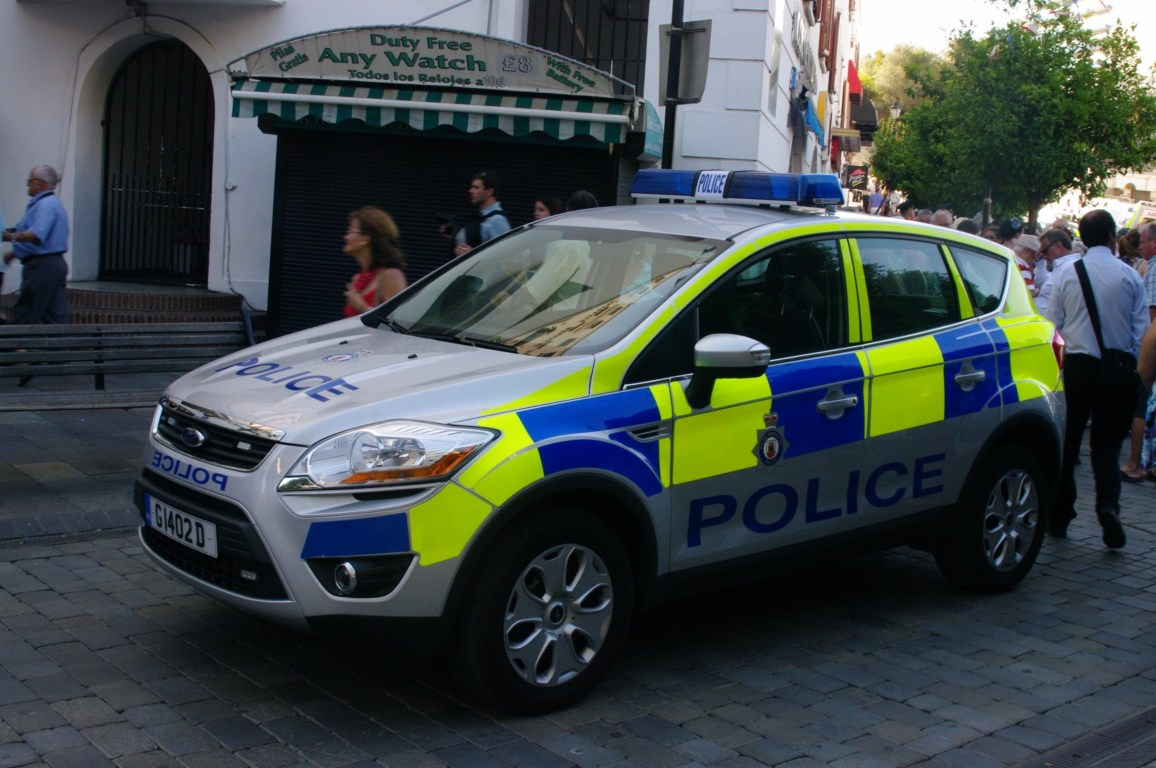
RGP Ford Kuga patrol car (2012)

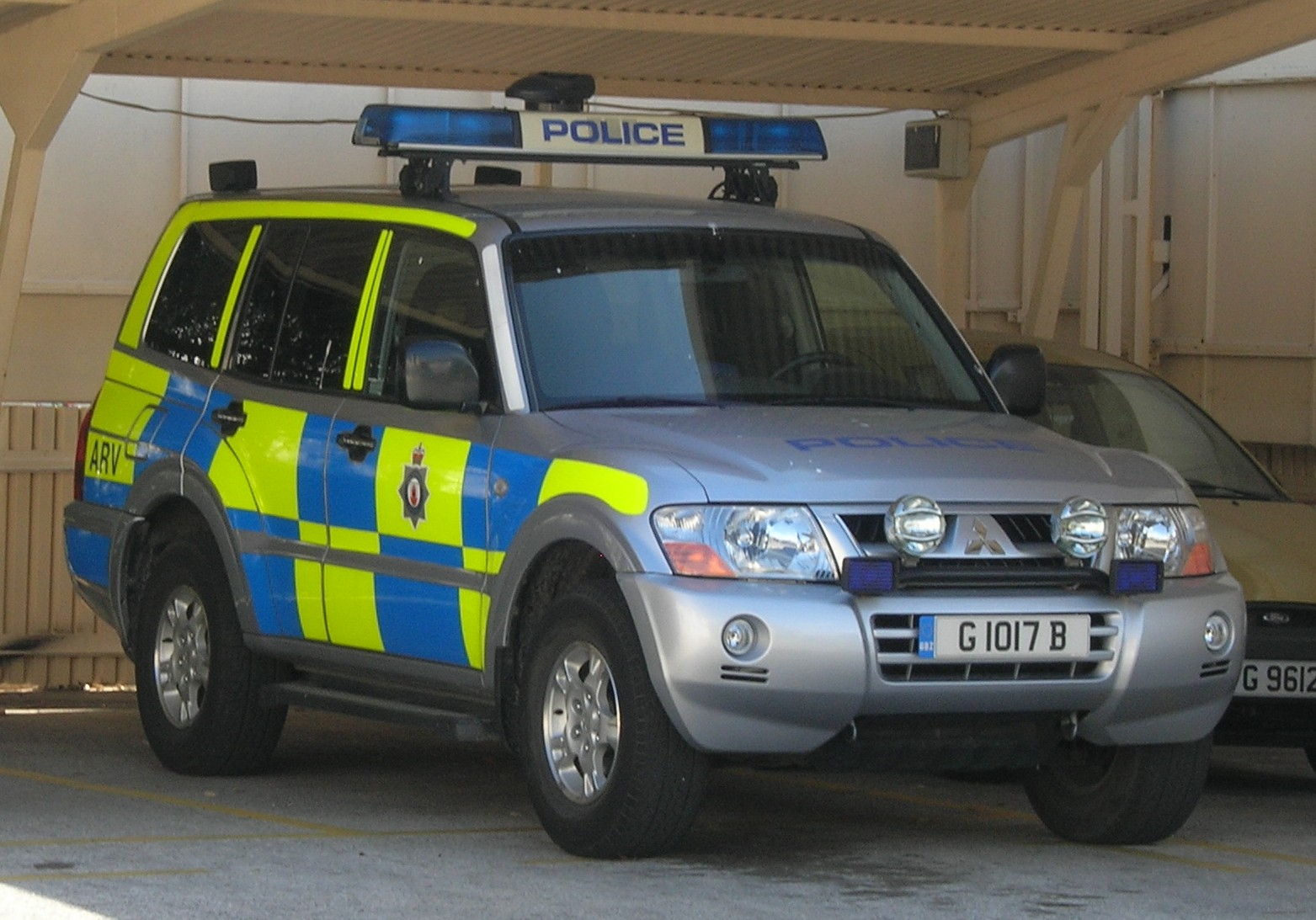
Armed Response Vehicle of the Royal Gibraltar Police (2008)

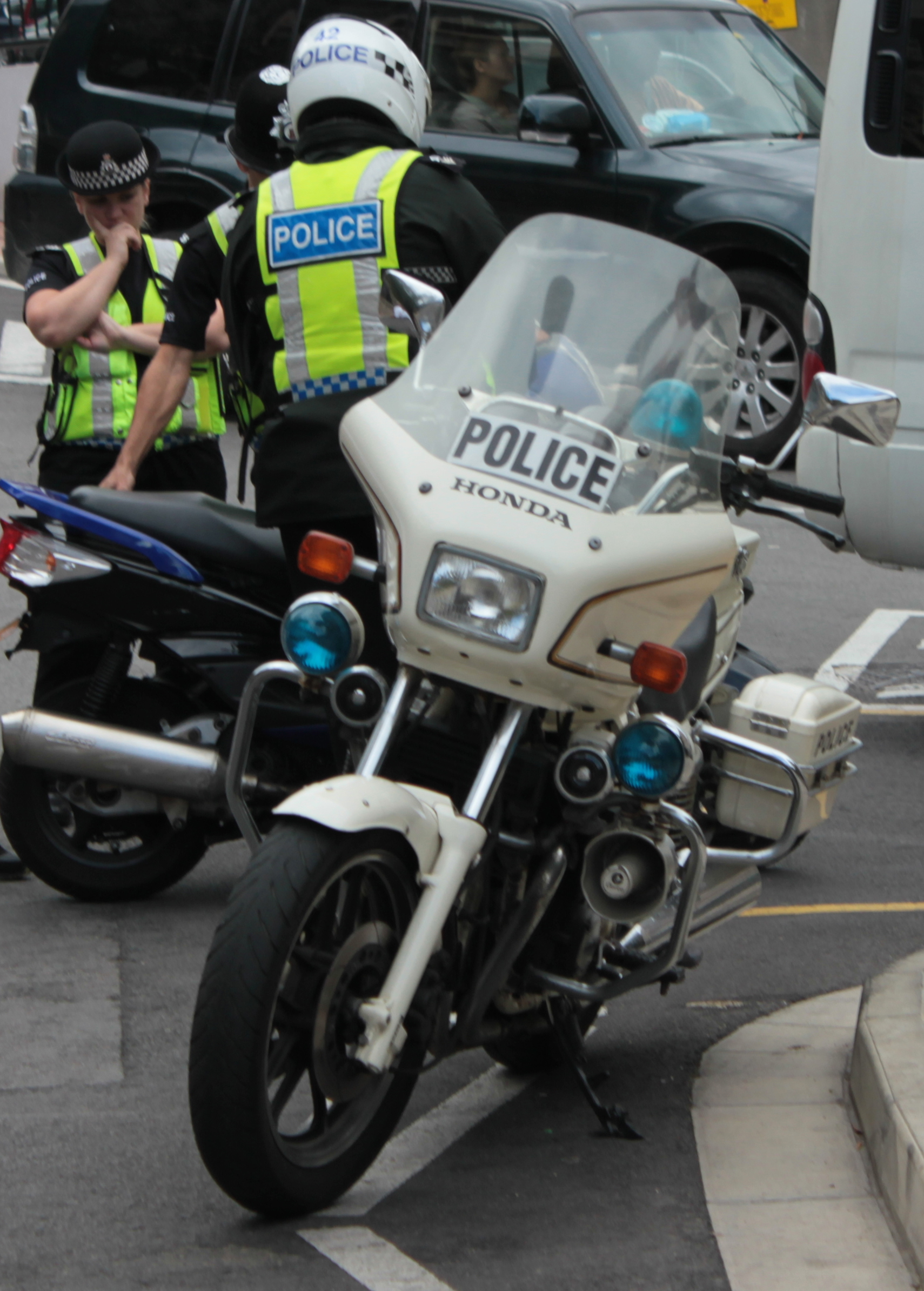
Royal Gibraltar Police Honda motorcycle (2011)

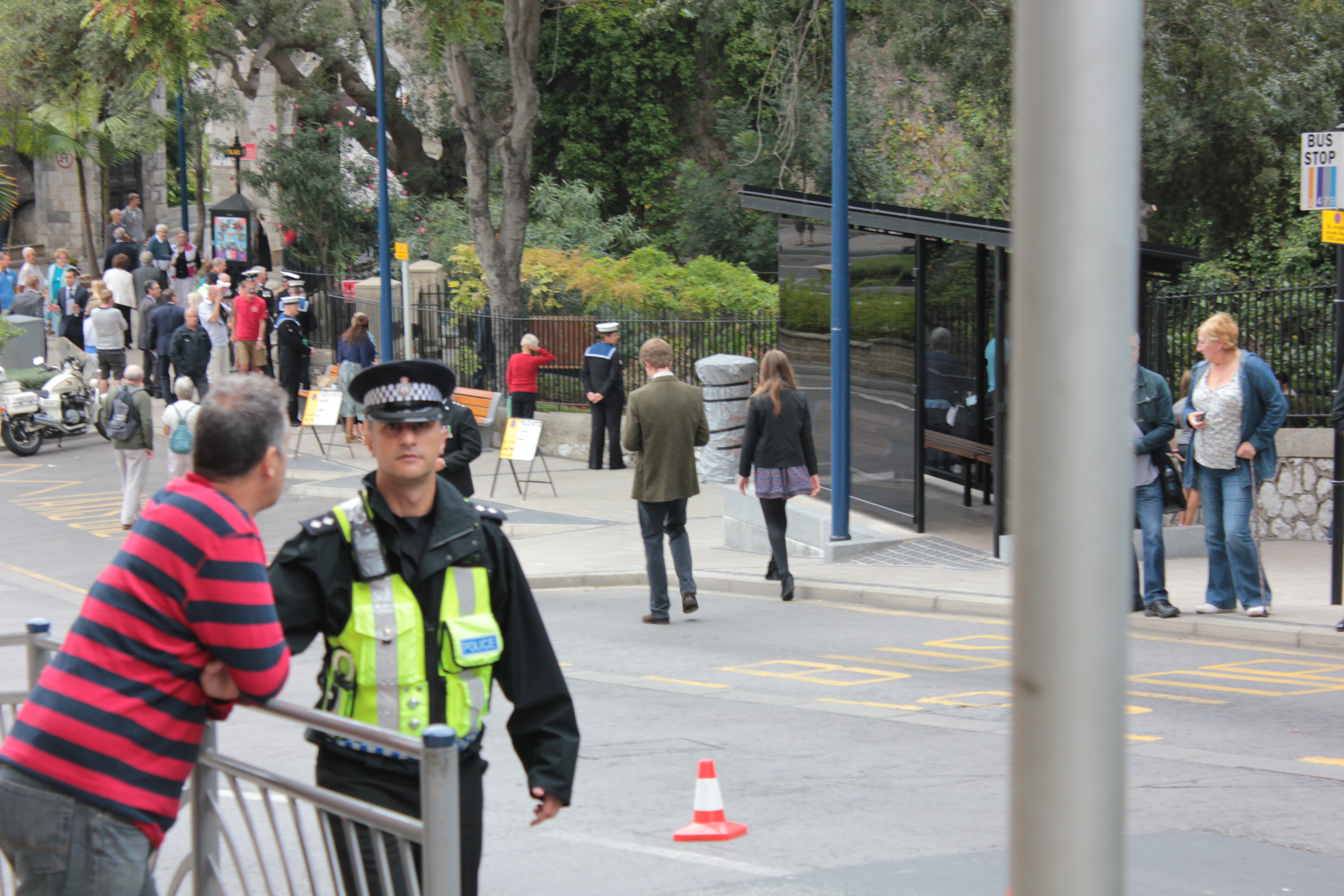
Royal Gibraltar Police Inspector in everyday uniform

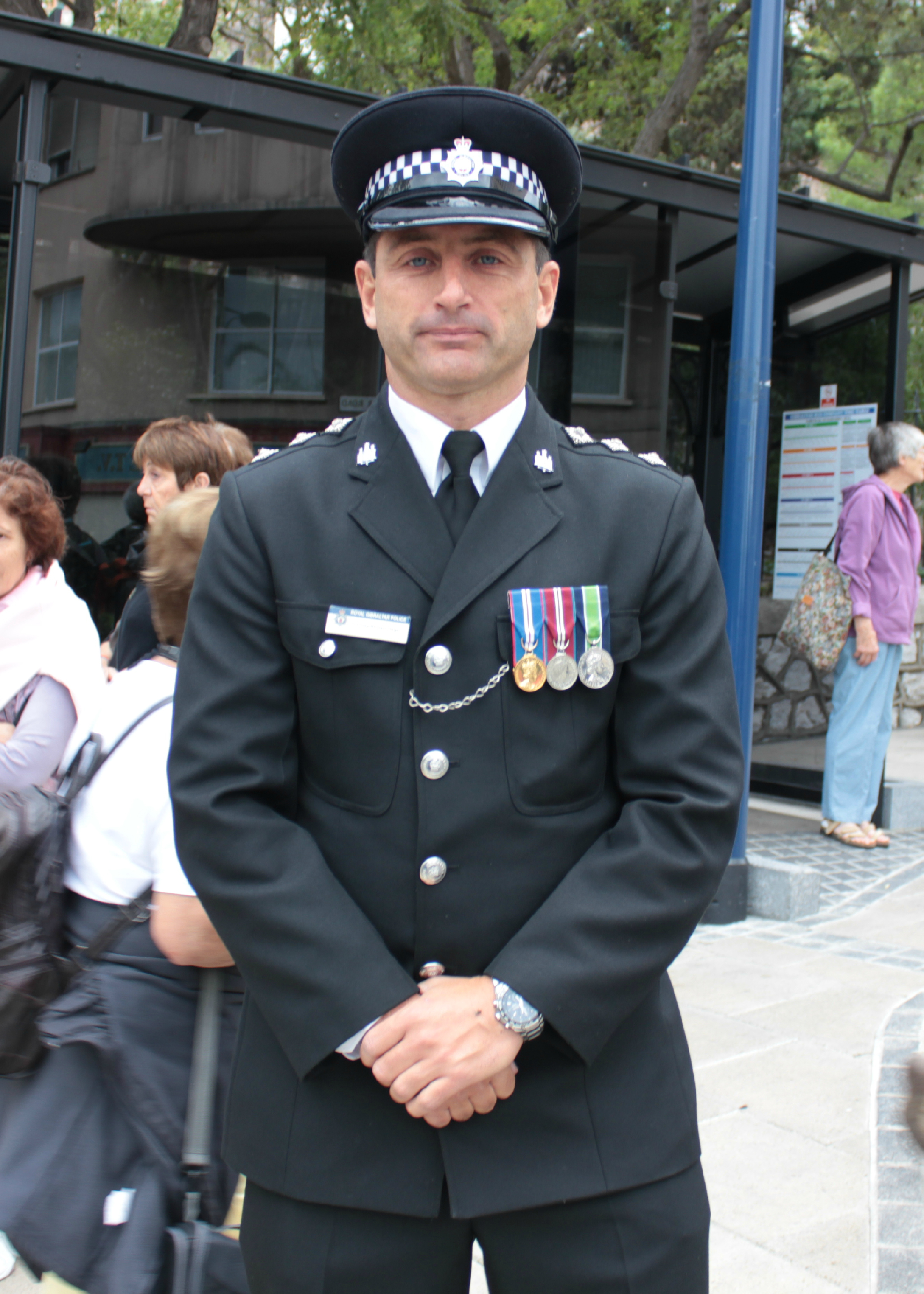
Chief Inspector in dress uniform

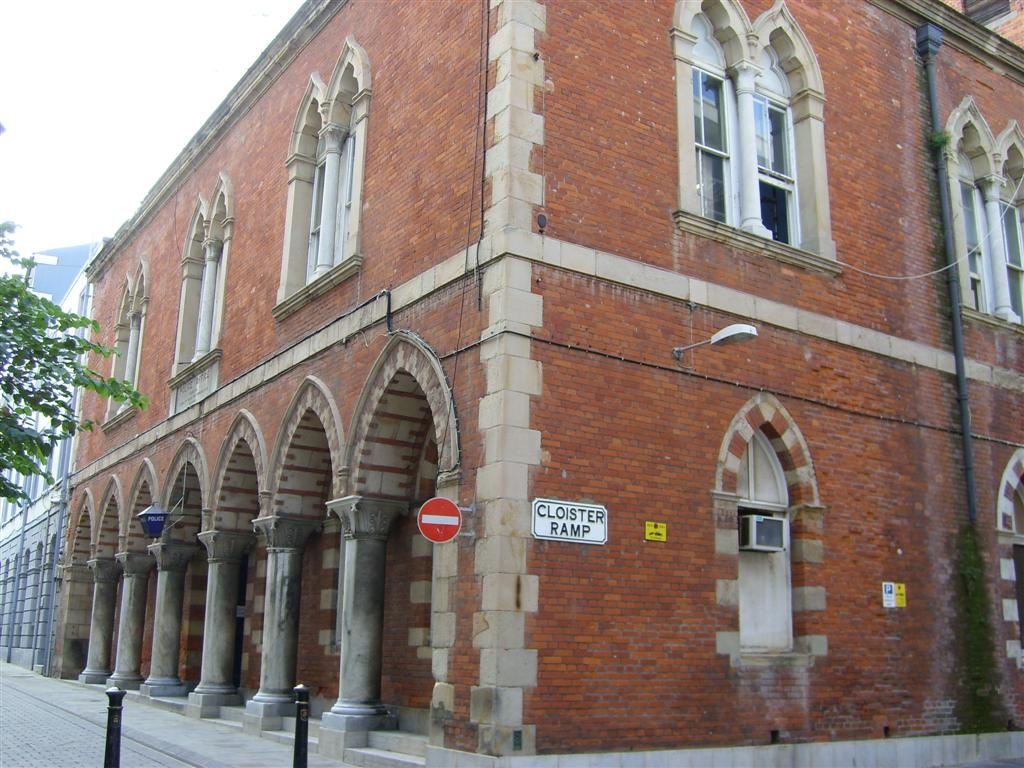
Central Police Station in Irish Town.

== See also ==
- Gibraltar Defence Police
- His Majesty's Customs (Gibraltar)
- Border and Coastguard Agency (Gibraltar)
- Law of Gibraltar
