= Borders and Coastguard Agency =

- the logo of the Borders and Coastguard Agency
- Motto: Keeping Gibraltar open for business!

Agency overview
- Formed: 1 November 2011

Jurisdictional structure
- Operations jurisdiction: Gibraltar, British Overseas Territories
- Constituting instrument: Borders & Coastguard Agency Act 2011
- Specialist jurisdictions: National border patrol, security, integrity; Coastal patrol, marine border protection, marine search and rescue

Operational structure
- Headquarters: 11 Winston Churchill Avenue

Website
- www.gibraltarborder.gi

The Borders and Coastguard Agency is the combined border guard and coast guard of Gibraltar. It was established as a statutory agency by an Act of the Gibraltar Parliament and has been operating since 1 November 2011. Customs duties are handled by His Majesty's Customs.

== Mission ==
The stated mission of the Borders and Coastguard Agency is: "to maintain a secure and fluid border and protect against criminal acts that threaten the security of travel, by enforcing the law and securing the confidence of travellers, in order to keep our homes safe and Gibraltar open for business".

== Role ==
Its role is to act as the main Gibraltar authority for aviation, maritime and land travel security and immigration. Gibraltar has an airport and a sea port, and shares a land border with Spain.

== Officers ==
The duties of the Borders and Coastguard Agency are carried out by uniformed officers.

== Uniform ==
Officers wear a typical British police-type agency uniform:

- Peaked cap (males) or bowler cap (females) with red and white chequered cap band
- White shirt
- Black tie
- Black trousers
- Long-sleeved or short-sleeved black jacket
- High-visibility kit vest
- Black T-shirt
- Black baseball cap

== See also ==
- List of law enforcement agencies in the United Kingdom, Crown Dependencies and British Overseas Territories
- Royal Gibraltar Police (RGP)
- Gibraltar Defence Police (GDP)
- His Majesty's Customs (Gibraltar)
