= George Alcock (footballer) =

English footballer (1902–1976)

Personal information
- Full name: George Leonard Alcock
- Date of birth: 15 August 1902
- Place of birth: Rusholme, England
- Date of death: 1976 (aged 73–74)
- Place of death: Bradford, England
- Height: 5 ft 10 in (1.78 m)
- Position: Forward

Senior career*
Years	Team	Apps	(Gls)
19??–1923	Wibsey		
1923	Liversedge		
1923–1924	Wombwell		
1924–1927	Bradford City	15	(9)
1927	Crewe Alexandra	3	(0)
1927–192?	Torquay United	0	(0)
1929–1930	Doncaster Rovers	3	(0)
- * Club domestic league appearances and goals

George Leonard Alcock (15 August 1902 – 1976) was an English professional footballer who played as a forward in the Football League for Bradford City, Crewe Alexandra and Doncaster Rovers. He served Yorkshire County Cricket Club as masseur and physiotherapist from 1953 to the 1970s.

== Life and career ==
Alcock was born in Rusholme, Lancashire, the son of Tom and Maud Mary Alcock. The 1911 Census records the family living in Shipley, in the West Riding of Yorkshire; Tom Alcock was employed as a clerk of works for a railway company, and George was the second of three living children. (Note: Joyce and ENFA list Alcock's birthplace as Chorlton, which is the registration district of his birth. That district covers part of what is now south Manchester, and is neither of the Cheshire Chorltons. The 1911 Census lists Alcock's place of birth specifically as Rusholme.)

In January 1923, Alcock, who was playing football for Wibsey in the West Riding County Amateur League, had a trial with Football League Second Division club Bradford City. According to the Leeds Mercury, he was "reputed to be one of the most talented centre-forwards in local junior football [and] has some remarkable goal scoring performances to his credit this season. In the second round of the West Riding Cup against Hopetown he registered five goals in succession, and in his last four matches he has found the net on ten occasions." He signed amateur forms with Bradford City, and represented their reserves from time to time while remaining a Wibsey player. He moved on to Liversedge, where an impressive performance in the FA Cup against Mexborough of the Midland League earned him a trial with another Midland League club, Wombwell. The trial proved successful, the "big bustling centre-forward" signed for Wombwell in October 1923, and went on to score 13 goals in what remained of the season and a further 11 in the next, before rejoining Bradford City, this time on professional terms, in December 1924.

Alcock made his Football League debut on 24 January 1925, standing in for the injured Reuben Butler in the Second Division match at home to Middlesbrough. Bradford City lost 1–0, and the Athletic News wrote that Alcock "proved a strong and forceful player, but both he and Rhodes were too much inclined to rely upon solo efforts." He played once more that season, and his next appearance was at the end of October 1925, when he scored in a draw with Wolverhampton Wanderers. He scored twice in the next fixture, a 3–1 win against South Shields, and contributed a goal in each of the next two matches, both wins, that took Bradford City up to seventh in the table. Against Stockport County on 12 December, he fell heavily during the first quarter of the game, damaging his leg so badly that he required knee surgery and was out for the rest of the season. Alcock returned to the league side "obviously lacking in confidence" for the first match of the new season, and scored, but was again injured, and did not resume until well into the new year. He finished the season with four goals from just seven matches as Bradford City were relegated, and was not included on their retained list.

After three Third Division North appearances without scoring for Crewe Alexandra did not lead to a permanent contract, Alcock tried his luck with Southern League club Torquay United in October 1927, but injury again intervened. He was operated on by orthopaedic specialist Sir Robert Jones, declared fit, and joined Doncaster Rovers in November 1929 on what was described as an extended trial. The Sheffield-based Sports Special wrote of Alcock as "one of those players who would have been a 'class' forward by now had misfortune not dogged his footsteps", and hoped for Doncaster's sake as well as his own that he would be a rare exception to the fact that "not many players who are thrown out of class football, as Alcock was, by cartilage trouble, ever return to their old form." In three appearances in the Third Division North and one in the FA Cup, he lacked speed, but performed well "without quite reproducing that form which caused many good judges to entertain high hopes of him", and was released by Doncaster in mid-January 1930.

Alcock qualified as a masseur, and set up in private practice in Bradford. He was appointed trainer to his former club, Bradford City, in the 1937 close season, and was succeeded a year later by his assistant, Harry Peel. The 1939 Register finds Alcock living in Marlborough Road, Bradford, with his wife, Cora née Busfield, and working as a manipulative masseur. Cora had herself followed the same occupation before their marriage. In November 1939, he was on duty at the local first-aid station while Cora slept downstairs at home. After a spark from the fire set light to her bedding, she woke to find the room full of smoke and managed to go upstairs and rescue their baby daughter. In 1953, Alcock became masseur to Yorkshire County Cricket Club, and the club extended his services to the touring Australians for that year's Headingley Test. He later became the county's physiotherapist, and retired from the role in the 1970s.

Alcock's death was registered in Bradford in the first quarter of 1976. He was 73.
