= Roger Dee =

American author (1914–2004)

- Dee c. 1953
- Born: Roger Dee Aycock; December 6, 1914; Floyd County, Georgia, United States
- Died: April 5, 2004 (aged 89); Rome, Georgia, United States
- Occupation: Author
- Writing career
- Pen name: Roger Dee
- Period: 1949-1971
- Genre: Science fiction

Roger Dee Aycock (December 6, 1914 – April 5, 2004) was an American author who wrote under the pseudonym Roger Dee. He primarily wrote science fiction. He contributed over fifty stories to magazines between 1949 and 1971.

== Bibliography ==
=== Novels ===
- An Earth Gone Mad (1954)
- Let the Sky Fall (non-science fiction, 1957)

=== Short stories ===
- The Wheel Is Death (1949)
- Ultimatum (1950)
- Unwelcome Tenant (1950)
- Slave of Eternity (1950)
- Last Return (1950)
- First Life (1951)
- Girl from Callisto (1951)
- The Watchers (1951)
- Palimpsest (1951)
- Grim Green World (1951) [only as by John Starr]
- Today Is Forever (1952)
- The Obligation (1952)
- The Reasonable People (1952)
- Wailing Wall (1952)
- The Star Dice (1952)
- The Persuasive Man (1952)
- Paradox Planet (1952)
- No Charge to the Membership (1953)
- Oh Mesmerist from Mimas! (1953)
- The Anglers of Arz (1953)
- Earthman's Choice (1953)
- Guest Artist (1953)
- The Minister Had To Wait (1953)
- The Enemy, Time (1953)
- The Springbird (1953)
- Problem on Balak (1953)
- Worlds Within Worlds (1953)
- Clean Break (1953)
- Pet Farm (1954)
- The Fresh Start (1954)
- Man Friday (1954)
- To Remember Charlie By (1954)
- Legacy (1954)
- The Frogs of Mars (1954)
- Tiger's Cage (1954)
- The Poundstone Paradox (1954)
- The Dog That Liked Carmen (1954)
- The Man Who Found Out (1954)
- The Interlopers (1954)
- Thank You, Member (1954)
- Assignment's End (1954)
- Wayfarer (1955)
- The Man Who Had Spiders (1956)
- The Voiceless Sentinels (1956)
- Travelogue (1956)
- First Landing (1957)
- Traders Risk (1958)
- Blue Monday (1958)
- Field Report (1958)
- Control Group (1960)
- The Feeling (1961)
- Inconstancy (1962)
- Rough Beast (1962)
- Perfect Match (1971)

== External links/References ==
- Works by Roger Dee at Project Gutenberg
- Works by or about Roger Dee at the Internet Archive
- Works by Roger Dee at LibriVox (public domain audiobooks)
- review of An Earth Gone Mad
- Roger Dee at the Internet Speculative Fiction Database
- IBList entry
- The 30th Golden Age of Science Fiction MEGAPACK®: Roger Dee

Specific
