= Dugan Aycock =

American golfer and golf course designer

Dugan "Doog" Aycock (April 8, 1908 – March 23, 2001) was an American professional golfer and golf course designer. Aycock was a member of the PGA of America for 68 years and served as the Carolinas Section President for more than 15 years and as National Vice President (now known as district director).

== Early life ==
Aycock was born in Charlotte, North Carolina.

== Professional career ==
In 1938, Aycock designed the Lexington Country Club and was its head professional there for 38 of the next 40 years.

During World War II, Aycock was the special services director of his Army unit. He smuggled golf equipment into Italy and North Africa in a shipment of kitchen fixtures, helped rebuild golf courses, and even organized an Army tournament. Among the players who participated were Tommy Bolt and Bobby Locke.

To raise money for the March of Dimes campaign against polio in 1947, Aycock came up with the idea of playing golf cross-country from Lexington, North Carolina to the ninth hole at Thomasville Golf Course; a distance of about 10 miles (16 km). Donors were asked to contribute and guess how many strokes it would take Aycock to complete the "hole". He teed off from a square in downtown Lexington and was allowed to tee the ball up on every shot except those that found water or ditches. He had to take penalty shots on those. It took Aycock a total of 114 strokes to go the entire 10 miles. Prior to starting, he wrote on a piece of paper sealed in an envelope that he thought it would take him 115 strokes. The event raised more than $5,000.

In addition to serving several terms as the PGA's vice president, he was a member of its executive committee, served on the PGA's Ryder Cup committee, and officiated at the Matches on multiple occasions.

== Awards and honors ==
- In 1957, Aycock was named national PGA Golf Professional of the Year
- In 1969, he was inducted into the North Carolina Sports Hall of Fame
- In 1981, he was inducted into the Carolinas PGA Hall of Fame
- In 1982, Aycock was earned entry into the Carolinas Golf Hall of Fame
- The Davidson County Amateur Champion is named in his honor
