= Edward Alcock (footballer) =

English footballer

Personal information
- Date of birth: 7 September 1913
- Place of birth: Congleton, England
- Date of death: 1981 (aged 67–68)
- Place of death: Stoke-on-Trent, England
- Height: 5 ft 7 1/2 in (1.71 m)
- Position: Outside left

Senior career*
Years	Team	Apps	(Gls)
1933–1935	Congleton Town	99	(24)
1935–1936	Tranmere Rovers	5	(1)
1936–1939	Congleton Town	138	(45)
- * Club domestic league appearances and goals

Edward Alcock (7 September 1913 – 1981) was a footballer who played as an outside left in the Football League for Tranmere Rovers. He also played for Congleton Town.
