= Dale Aycock =

American author

Dale Aycock is an American author of science fiction.

Aycock was born on August 1, 1935, in San Joaquin Valley, California. Her first two science fiction novels were Stardrifter and Starspinner, both space operas.

Aycock is a member of the South Bay Branch of the California Writers Club and the World Future Society. She lives in Los Gatos, California.

== Notable works ==
=== Stardrifter ===
Stardrifter, also referred to as Star Drifter, is a 1981 novel in which the owner of a interstellar trading company gets caught up in a conspiracy to rule the galaxy.

=== Starspinner ===
Starspinner is a 1981 novel in which space pilot Christopher Marlowe must stop his enemy from becoming dictator of Earth.

Greg Costikyan reviewed Starspinner in Ares Magazine #11 and commented that "Aycock's relentlessly fast-paces plot does not allow much time for character development or for depiction of the society in which the characters function. Nevertheless, the human conflict is dealt with in sufficient detail to prevent total loss of interest in the characters. Starspinner is an above-average science fiction novel; Aycock is a writer to watch." The book was also reviewed in Voice of Youth Advocates.

== Bibliography ==
- Stardrifter (1981)
- Starspinner (1981)
- Starspinner II: Last Man Standing (2007)
- Star's End (2015)
- Dark Minds (2016)
- Firewing (2019)
