= Nathan Alcock =

English physician

Nathan Alcock FRS
- Born: September 1707; Aston, Runcorn, Cheshire, England
- Died: 8 December 1779 (aged 72); Runcorn, England
- Education: Edinburgh University; Leiden University
- Occupation: Physician
- Title: Doctor

Nathan Alcock (September 1707 – 8 December 1779) was an English physician.

== Early life and education ==
Nathan Alcock was born at Aston, near Runcorn, Cheshire, England, the second son of David Alcock and his wife Mary née Breck. David Alcock was a descendant of Bishop John Alcock, the founder of Jesus College, Cambridge. He was educated initially by his parents and then at a local school but he left this school, probably because of his dislike of the schoolmaster. He promised his father that he would qualify in medicine in return for a small estate in Wirral, Cheshire, which was worth about £50 a year. He went to medical school at Edinburgh, and then to Leiden where he was taught by Boerhaave and his contemporaries, Gaubius, Albinus, and Gravesand. He graduated M.D. in 1737.

== Medical career ==
He returned to England and went to Oxford University. Here he found that one of the professors in the medical faculty gave no lectures and the other did not reside there. He therefore began to give unauthorised lectures in anatomy and chemistry. This led to opposition from the professors who argued that his theological opinions were unsound. However his lectures were popular with the students and he was supported by eminent people including William Blackstone and Robert Lowth (who was later Bishop of London). In 1741 he was granted the degree of M.A. and was incorporated from Jesus College. He graduated B.M. in 1744, and M.D. in 1749. Also in 1749 he was elected a Fellow of the Royal Society and in 1754 was made Fellow of the Royal College of Physicians, London.

He built up a large practice in Oxford and became very wealthy. However, possibly because of ill health, or following the death of a woman he intended to marry, he returned to Runcorn. Here he built up a practice as large as his practice had been in Oxford. He died from a stroke in Runcorn in 1779 and was buried in the parish church there.

Politically he was a whig and theologically he was a follower of Bishop Hoadly. His Leiden thesis was on pneumonia. He published nothing during his lifetime but his brother Thomas, vicar of Runcorn, edited and published his The Rise of Mahomet, Accounted for on Natural and Civil Principles in 1796. Also after Nathan's death, in 1780, Thomas Alcock published his biography entitled Some Memoirs of the Life of Dr. Nathan Alcock.
