= Dunleath Historical District =

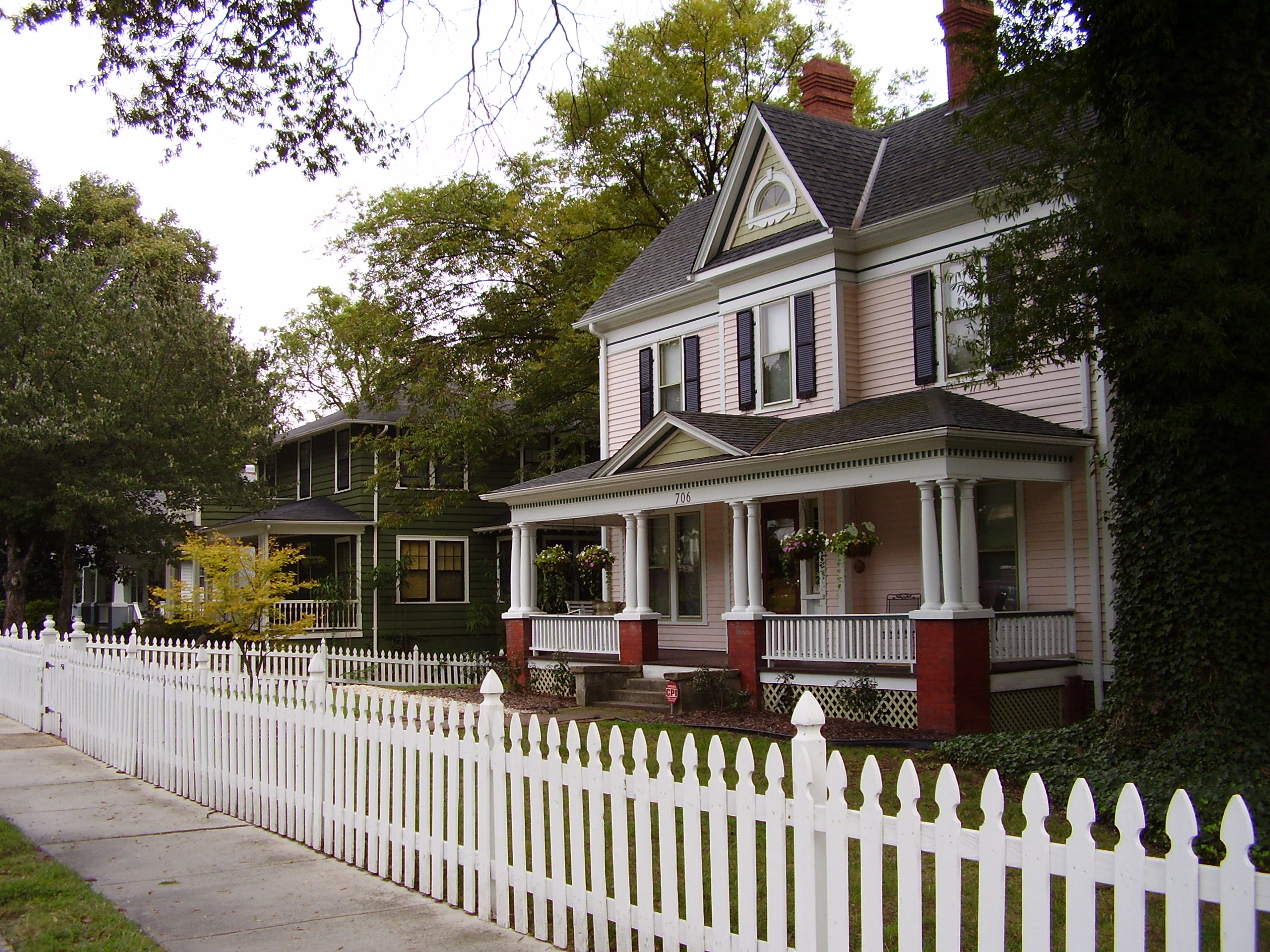
Dunleath Historic District

Dunleath Historic District is a neighborhood in the northeast section of the United States city of Greensboro, North Carolina. The Dunleath Historic District was named for the mansion, no longer existing, of Robert Dick, an early resident of the neighborhood. Dunleath consists of many late nineteenth and early twentieth century residences and composes one of three historic districts in Greensboro. Dunleath was formerly named the Charles B. Aycock Historic District, but the name was changed in 2017. The name of a middle school in Dunleath was changed from Aycock to Swann.

== Geography ==
=== Boundaries ===
Dunleath is bounded as follows:

- on the north by East Bessemer Avenue;
- on the west by the Southern Railway tracks;
- on the east by Lindsay Street; and
- on the south by the Murrow Boulevard.

=== ZIP code ===
The 27405 ZIP code corresponds entirely or almost entirely with Dunleath.

== History ==
The Dunleath neighborhood had its beginnings in 1895, when textile magnate Caesar Cone graded and paved Summit Avenue, a boulevard that connected downtown Greensboro to Cone's manufacturing facilities. The neighborhood's central location to downtown and the Cone mills made it a desirable location for city residents, who erected large homes in Queen Anne styles with turrets, porches laced with brackets and spindles, and elaborate window shapes. Later houses follow Colonial Revival and Craftsman influence, yet nearly all houses in the district share broad front porches, mature trees, and generous floor plans.

The neighborhood was rediscovered in the 1970s by artists and designers who sought spaces with large rooms and modest price tags. Dunleath is separated by railroad tracks from Fisher Park Historic District. Dunleath residents led citywide efforts to keep major league baseball in their neighborhood in 2003, and developed lofty goals in redevelopment of the Summit Avenue corridor. Residents of the Dunleath neighborhood point to plans for new construction in the form of businesses and residences on vacant land along the Avenue, and their work to reunite their corner of the city with Greensboro's downtown.

Points of interest include the World War Memorial Stadium at 510 Yanceyville Street, constructed as a tribute to veterans of the First World War, and later witness to such baseball players as Jackie Robinson, Mickey Mantle, Carl Yastrzemski, Roger Maris, and Derek Jeter. The Greensboro Farmers' Curb Market at 501 Yanceyville Street is open year-round and features fresh flowers, foods, and produce. Notable houses include the castle-like Vaught House at 519 Summit Avenue, the Mediterranean-inspired Sigmund Sternberger House at 712 Summit Avenue, and the Swann Middle School designed by New York firm Starrett and Van Vleck, located at 811 Cypress Street.

== Parks and public spaces ==
- Sterburger Park
- World War Memorial Stadium
- Greensboro Curb Market

== Notable architects and builders ==
- Harry Barton
- Starrett and Van Vleck (New York)
- William P. Rose

== On the National Register of Historic Places ==
Summit Avenue National Register Historic District, 1993
