= Thomas Alcock (adventurer) =

English traveller and adventurer

Thomas Alcock (died 1563) was an English traveller and adventurer and an agent or servant of the Muscovy Company from 1558 to 1563. According to one of his letters, preserved by Hakluyt, in 1558 he took his first journey overland from Moscow to Smolensk in Russia, and then through Poland towards Danzig. He was, however, prevented from proceeding further than Tirwill (probably Turovli on the Dvina), where he was imprisoned in irons for thirty-six days, probably at the instigation of rival traders and ambassadors from Danzig, Lübeck, and Hamburg, who, moreover, prevailed upon the king of Poland to stop all traffic through his dominions of the English trading to Muscovy. There is no further evidence as to the termination of this journey; but in all probability Alcock was allowed to depart for England by way of warning, with the loss of all the money and goods entrusted to him by the company.

His second and last journey on behalf of the company was in 1563. Leaving Jeraslaue (Jaroslav), in Russia, he sailed down the Volga to Astracan (Astrakhan); he then coasted the western shores of the Caspian Sea, and proceeded to Shammaki (Shamakha) in the Caucasus; from there he travelled overland to Casbin (Kasbin), in Persia. Upon his return he was murdered at a place named Levvacta, whose location is unknown but was described as being a day and a half's journey from Shamakha. It is probable that he met his death at the hands of a nobleman of the king of Hyrcania's court, with whom he was too earnest in demanding his debts. Another account says that 'he was slaine by false knaves (robbers) in riding from the court without companie.' Alcock was the second Englishman to sail across the Caspian Sea into Persia, Anthony Jenkinson being the first to lead the way in 1561. The narrative of Alcock's last voyage was written by his fellow traveller, Richard Chenie.
