= Ronald Alcock =

British stamp dealer and philatelic publisher (1905–1991)

Ronald Cecil Alcock
- Born: Ronald Cecil Alcock; 26 March 1905
- Died: 6 July 1991 (aged 86)
- Occupation: Stamp dealer

The logo of Alcock's firm.

Ronald Cecil Alcock (26 March 1905 – 6 July 1991) was a British stamp dealer and philatelic publisher notable for writing or publishing some of the key works in British philately. He collaborated with Captain Frank Holland in many of his works.

== Biography ==
A native of Cheltenham, Gloucestershire, Alcock was based at 11 Regent Street, where he became an expert on the early postmarks and stamps of Victorian Britain, and traded as R.C. Alcock Ltd.

In the 1970s, R.C. Alcock and Rose Titford carried on an associated business from 11 Regent Street under the name Colonial & Foreign Stamp Co. Ltd.

Alcock married Evelyn Beatrice Bird in 1932. He did in 1991.

== Author of ==
- The Alphabets of the British Line-engraved Stamps, 1936. Second edition 1937.
- The Postmarks of Great Britain and Ireland, Being a Survey of British Postmarks from 1660 to 1940, 1940. Five supplements. (With F.C. Holland)
- Reserve Plate 15. One Penny Rose-Red on White Paper. Alphabet II, 1947.
- Reserve Plate 16. One Penny Rose-Red on White Paper. Alphabet II, 1947.
- Hand-Engraved Plates 50 and 51, Alphabet IV, 1948. (With F.C. Holland)
- British Postage Stamp Varieties Illustrated. Queen Victoria surface-printed issues to King George VI, 1949 (With C.W. Meredith)
- British Postmarks, A Short History and Guide, 1960. (With F.C. Holland)
- Maltese Cross Cancellations of the United Kingdom, 1959. (With F.C. Holland) (Second edition 1970 ISBN 0-900039-09-4)

== Selected works published ==
- The Stamps of Great Britain: The line engraved issues; Archer plates: 1841 penny red die I. Alphabet I. Plates 92-101 by Clive Gardiner-Hill, 1950.
- The Stamps of Great Britain The Line-Engraved Issues 1841 Penny Red Die I Plates 102-131 by Clive Gardiner-Hill, 1951.
- The Repairs of The 1841 One Penny Plates 1-40 by J.W.M. Stone, 1973.
