= Thomas Alcock (priest) =

Anglican clergyman and author (1709–1798)

- Born: 1709; Aston, Runcorn, Cheshire, England
- Died: August 24, 1798 (aged 88–89); Runcorn, Cheshire, England
- Education: Warrington School; Brasenose College, Oxford
- Occupation: Clergyman
- Title: Reverend
- Spouse: Mary Harwood

Thomas Alcock (1709 – 24 August 1798) was a clergyman in the Church of England, a pluralist and an author.

== Early life ==
He was born at Aston, near Runcorn, Cheshire the third son of David Alcock and his wife Mary née Breck. David Alcock was a descendant of Bishop John Alcock, the founder of Jesus College, Cambridge. Thomas was educated at Boteler Grammar School Warrington, then matriculated from Brasenose College, Oxford in 1728, proceeded B.A. in 1731 and M.A. in 1741.

== Ministry ==
He was licensed as curate of Stonehouse, Plymouth in 1731. In November 1732 he began acting as the minister of the nearby parish of St Budeaux to which he was officially licensed the following year. He was also instituted as vicar of Runcorn in 1756 and ran this parish as a pluralist with the aid of curates. He was a Cheshire J.P. but continued to spend most of his time in Devon and only returned to Runcorn towards the end of his life.

He became popular locally, particularly when he omitted to collect tithes. He was also noted for his eccentric habits, his spartan lifestyle, and his kindness to the poor to whom he also acted as doctor and lawyer. In 1769 the living of St Andrew, Plymouth became vacant and Alcock expected to be elected to it. He was unsuccessful and refused to preach his regular sermon at the church or indeed to enter the church again.

In 1771 he helped to purchase land at Weston Peverel to provide a master for the St Budeaux charity school and to clothe the poor. In 1769 he was granted the freedom of the borough of Plymouth.

== Farmer and cidermaker ==
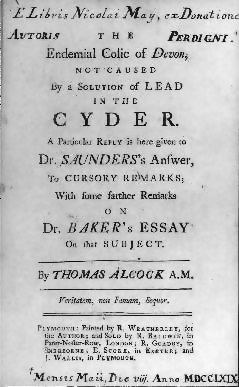
The Endemial Colic of Devon not Caused by a Solution of Lead in the Cyder

Thomas Alcock farmed at Ernesettle and described himself as ‘A Cydermaker’. He attacked the excise duty on cider and this was repealed in 1766. It had been suggested that a severe colic peculiar to Devon was the result of lead poisoning from the presses, pipework, and storage vessels of cider. This was refuted by Alcock who argued that the colic resulted only from the small shot used in bottle cleansing.

== Personal and family life ==
He married Mary Harwood of Ernesettle, Plymouth and through his marriage he obtained considerable property locally. The marriage was childless and Mary died in 1777. Alcock married again at the age of 78 and returned to Runcorn where he died in 1798. His estate included £20,000 in 3% consols as well as land and property in Runcorn.

After the death of his brother Nathan in 1779, Thomas produced Some Memoirs of the Life of Dr Nathan. In 1796 he also edited and arranged for the publication of Nathan's The Rise of Mahomet, Accounted for on Natural and Civil Principles.

== Publications ==
- Observations on the Defects of the Poor Laws (1752)
- Remarks on Two Bills for the Better Maintenance of the Poor (1752)
- Observations on that Part of the Late Act of Parliament which Lays an Additional Duty on Cider (1763)
- Cursory Remarks on Dr. Baker's Essay on the Endemial Colic in Devon (1767)
- The Endemial Colic of Devon not Caused by a Solution of Lead in the Cyder (1769)
