= Political development in modern Gibraltar =

Gibraltar is a British Overseas Territory located on the southern end of the Iberian Peninsula at the entrance of the Mediterranean Sea. During the early days of the British administration, Gibraltar was maintained primarily as a military outpost with limited attention paid to its role as a trading post. Initially long term settlement of Gibraltar was uncertain but as Spain's power waned it became established as an important base for the British Royal Navy. Throughout the 19th century there was conflict between the competing roles of military and trading posts, leading to tensions between the civilian population and the Governor of the day. Some Governors encouraged the development of the civilian role in government, while others regarded it as a nuisance. As a result, compared with other former British colonies, civilian Government in Gibraltar emerged largely in the 20th century as the needs of the civilian population were often considered by Governors as subordinate to the needs of the military. Since World War II, Gibraltarians have increasingly asserted their own individual identity. The Rock's relationship with Spain and the sovereignty dispute continues to affect the Politics of Gibraltar to this day.

== Background ==
The majority of the original Spanish population left Gibraltar following the Anglo-Dutch Capture of Gibraltar in 1704, taking with them the articles of the former Spanish administration. As a result, the current constitution and laws of Gibraltar reflect English common law and Acts of Parliament.

In the 18th and 19th centuries, the remnants of the Spanish population were augmented by a settler population established as the British maintained a trading post alongside the military garrison. As the number of inhabitants continued to grow, they found their political and legal standing became dependent on individual Governors and their commitment to the development of a civilian society.

Initially, long term settlement of Gibraltar was not contemplated and on several occasions in the 18th century the British considered returning Gibraltar to Spanish rule. In addition, several Spanish attempts to retake Gibraltar, most notably during the Great Siege of Gibraltar (1779–1783) meant that long term settlement was never inevitable. Gibraltar was unquestionably primarily a fortress and a colony second during the 18th century. During the 19th century, as Spain's power waned, the Napoleonic Wars reinforced the importance of Gibraltar as a fortress and Royal Navy base. It was officially declared a Crown colony in 1830.

== Early developments ==
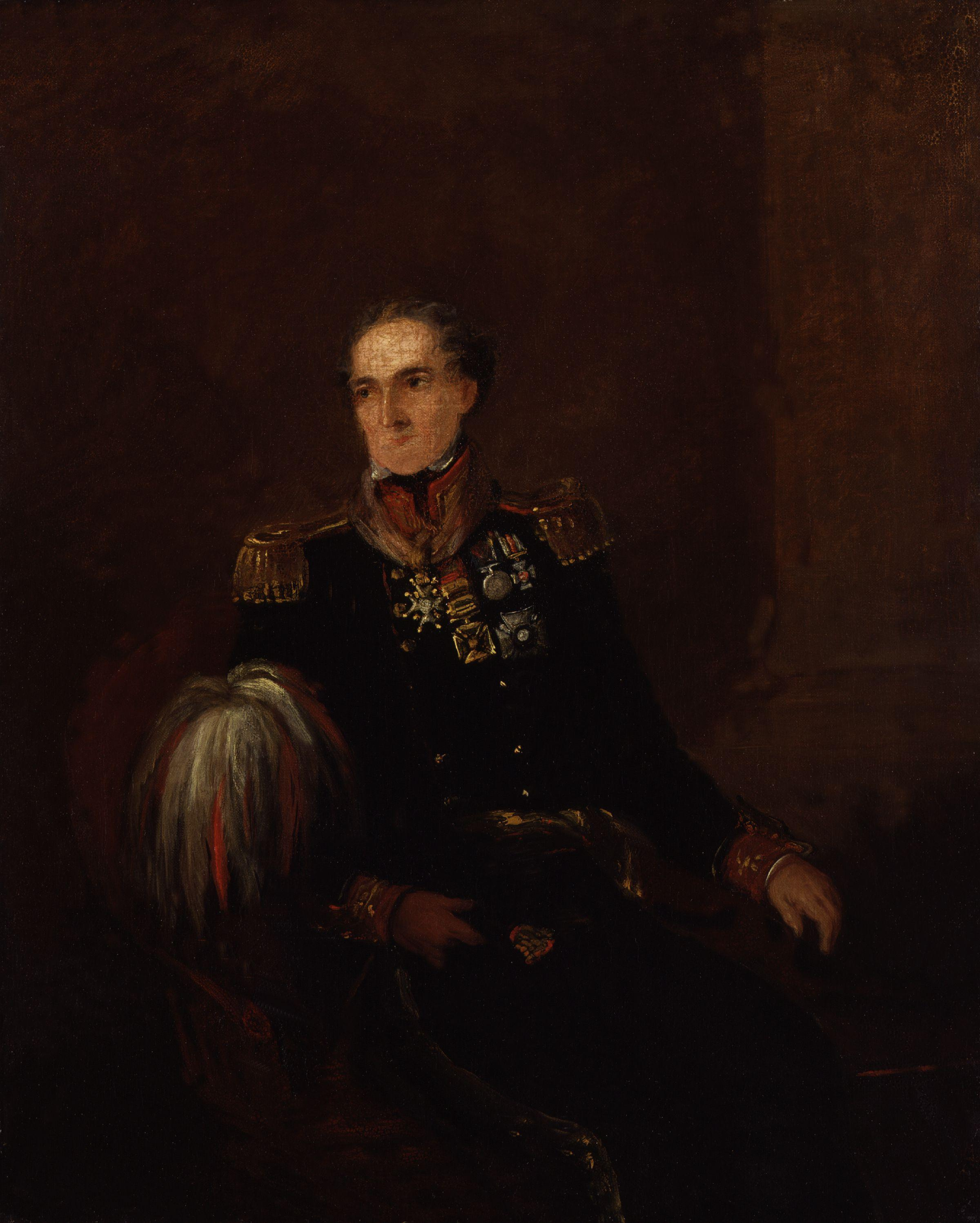
Sir Robert Gardiner's tenure as Governor of Gibraltar was shortened as a result of his antipathy towards the civilian population

The first civil judiciary was authorised in 1720, with a separate criminal and civil jurisdiction for Gibraltar created in 1739. However, there were no civilian courts and jurisdiction was exercised by the military under the authority of the Governor. Justices of the peace were first appointed in 1753 and a vice admiralty court established in 1793 to provide for the public auction of enemy ships captured by the Royal Navy.

The first political advances took place during the governorship of Sir George Don which started in 1814. An Exchange and Commercial Library was founded in 1817, with the Exchange Committee initially focused on furthering the interests of merchants based in the fortress. The Exchange Committee evolved into an organ that provided for a local voice in government, although of itself it had no real powers.

Upon declaring Gibraltar to be a Crown Colony in 1830, the 1830 Charter of Justice established an independent judiciary and a Supreme Court of Justice. This reflected the British colonial system, where individual colonies had their own, distinct governments, finances, and judicial systems. The Charter, however, fell short of explicitly providing for a local role in government, although responsibility for government of Gibraltar passed from the War Office to the newly created Colonial Office. The Gibraltar Police Force was also established following the model of the Metropolitan Police; the first British Overseas Territory to do so.

Although there was not an explicit role for the local population in government, Governor Sir George Don encouraged the development of the civilian administration. Following the establishment of the Exchange Committee by merchants and landowners, Don looked to the committee to provide a local voice. His successor Sir Robert Gardiner proved to be less keen, arguing that the needs of the civilian population were subordinate to the military garrison. Sir Robert suppressed a public petition from the Exchange Committee pressing for an enquiry into his administration in 1852 but was recalled to London in 1855 as unease in his administration grew.

The role of the civilian administration remained focused on law and order. Political development remained slow and largely limited by the role of Gibraltar as a fortress. An 1889 ordinance defined the rights to residency, highlighting the importance of native-born individuals. In 1910, the new governor Sir Archibald Hunter sought to administer Gibraltar primarily as a fortess, regarding the civilian population as something of a nuisance. Following disquiet in the civilian population, Sir Archibald was also recalled before his term of office ended.

It was not until 1921 that the first elections for a City Council in Gibraltar were held.

== Development of the modern Government of Gibraltar ==
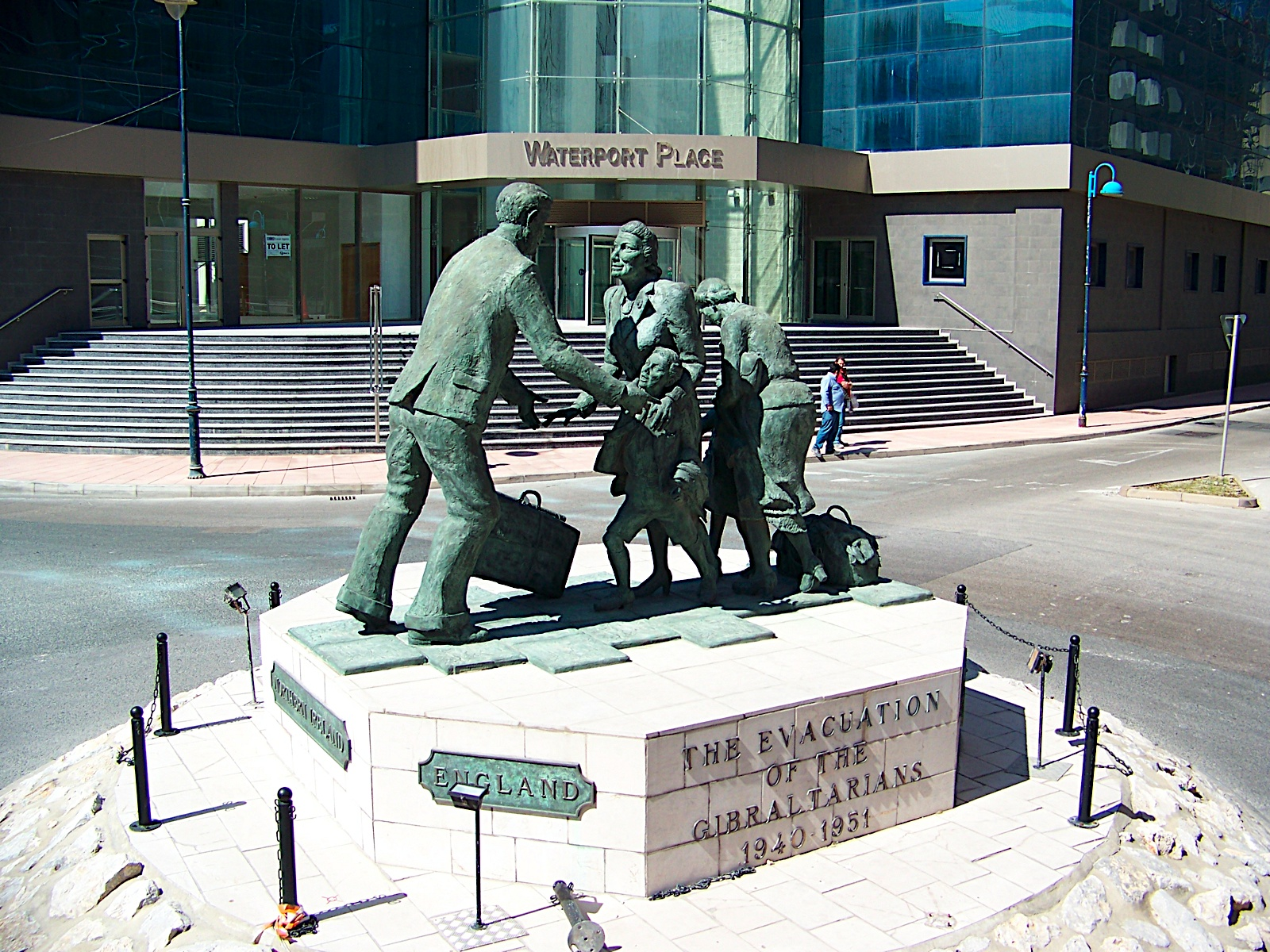
The evacuation of the Gibraltarian civilian population during World War II is commemorated in a monument at Waterport Road, Gibraltar

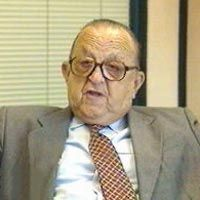
Sir Joshua Hassan, longest running leader of the AACR and Chief Minister of Gibraltar for 18 years.

The outbreak of World War II in 1939 put an early end to the beginnings of self-government in Gibraltar. Gibraltar's strategic geographical position and the threat of bombing raids by the Axis powers led to the evacuation of most of the civilian population. Many were evacuated first to Morocco and later to the United Kingdom, others were taken to the Portuguese island of Madeira or the British colony of Jamaica. The evacuation led to conflicting emotions; on the one hand the experience of the Blitz strengthened British ties, while prejudice and racism encountered in the United Kingdom reinforced the sense of Gibraltarian identity. Spanish neutrality ensured Gibraltar was never the subject of a serious military threat but it led to the suspicion among evacuees that a deal had been done with the Fascist Dictator General Franco to return Gibraltar to Spain after the conflict.

=== Foundation of the Association for the Advancement of Civil Rights ===
The situation led to the founding of the Association for the Advancement of Civil Rights (AACR) in Gibraltar in December 1942. Led by Albert Risso the AACR was intended to represent and protect the rights of Gibraltarians. Joshua Hassan was instrumental in making the AACR a civil rights-based organisation inspired by an anti-colonial ideology. During the war the AACR received support from the then Governor General Mason-MacFarlane who encouraged the AACR to fulfil the representative role that the Committee of the Exchange and the Commercial Library used to fill. In 1945, the Colonial Office had offered a City Council with the same number of elected and nominated members. The AACR, along with the rest of representative bodies of Gibraltar declined the offer and asked for a majority of elected members. In April, the British authorities eventually gave way and a council where elected members outnumbered those nominated for the first time was established. In the elections held for City Council in July 1945 the AACR won all seven contested seats, with Joshua Hassan being elected the first post-war Chairman of the City Council.

=== Gibraltar Constitution order, 1950 ===
In 1950, the Gibraltar Constitution Order and Gibraltar Election Rules ended the Governor's monopoly of legislative authority, with the formation of a Legislative Council. Subsequent amendments allowed for a majority of elected members in the assembly.

=== Gibraltar Constitution order, 1964 ===
Early in 1964 a Constitutional Conference was held in Gibraltar, which recommended increasing the number of elected members from seven to eleven seats and abolishing the nominated members of the Legislative Council. These recommendations were accepted and implemented in time for the 1964 elections.

=== Decolonisation agenda in the United Nations ===
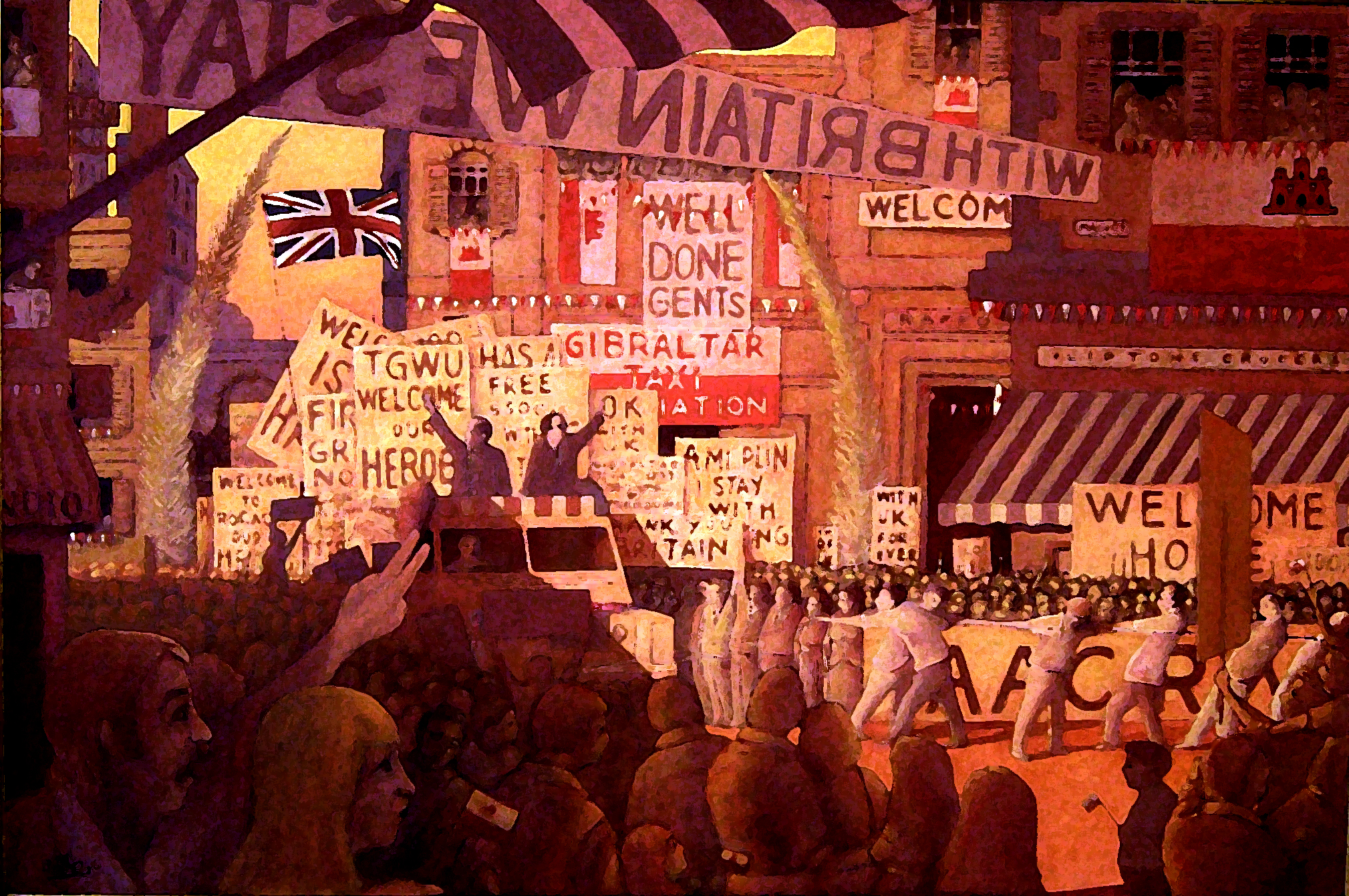
Painting by Ambrose Avellano depicting the welcome received by Joshua Hassan and Peter Isola following their representations at the United Nations

In the 1960s, the United Nations push for decolonisation meant that the issue of Gibraltar was raised at the UN. Spain successfully lobbied to have the situation with Gibraltar raised at the Special Committee on Decolonization. Gibraltar was represented at the UN by Joshua Hassan and Peter Isola who denied that Gibraltar was an oppressed society and emphasised that Gibraltarians wanted to retain a connection with the United Kingdom:

Nothing could be further from the truth than to suggest that the people of Gibraltar are subjugated or exploited by a foreign power.

— Sir Joshua Hassan

The British Government developed a two-pronged approach to the decolonisation of dependent territories that were then still part of the British Empire. It encouraged the development of self-government with the aim of granting independence to any territory that wanted it. For those territories that wished to continue an association with the United Kingdom it would work with the democratically elected representatives to define arrangements that would permit it. In the opinion of the British Government, the position with regard to Gibraltar was complicated by provisions in the 1713 Treaty of Utrecht that required the British to offer the territory to the Spanish crown if Britain were to relinquish it, which limited the options for independence. The Government of Gibraltar does not share this opinion but so far has opted to retain the link with the United Kingdom.

=== Sovereignty Referendum, 1967 ===
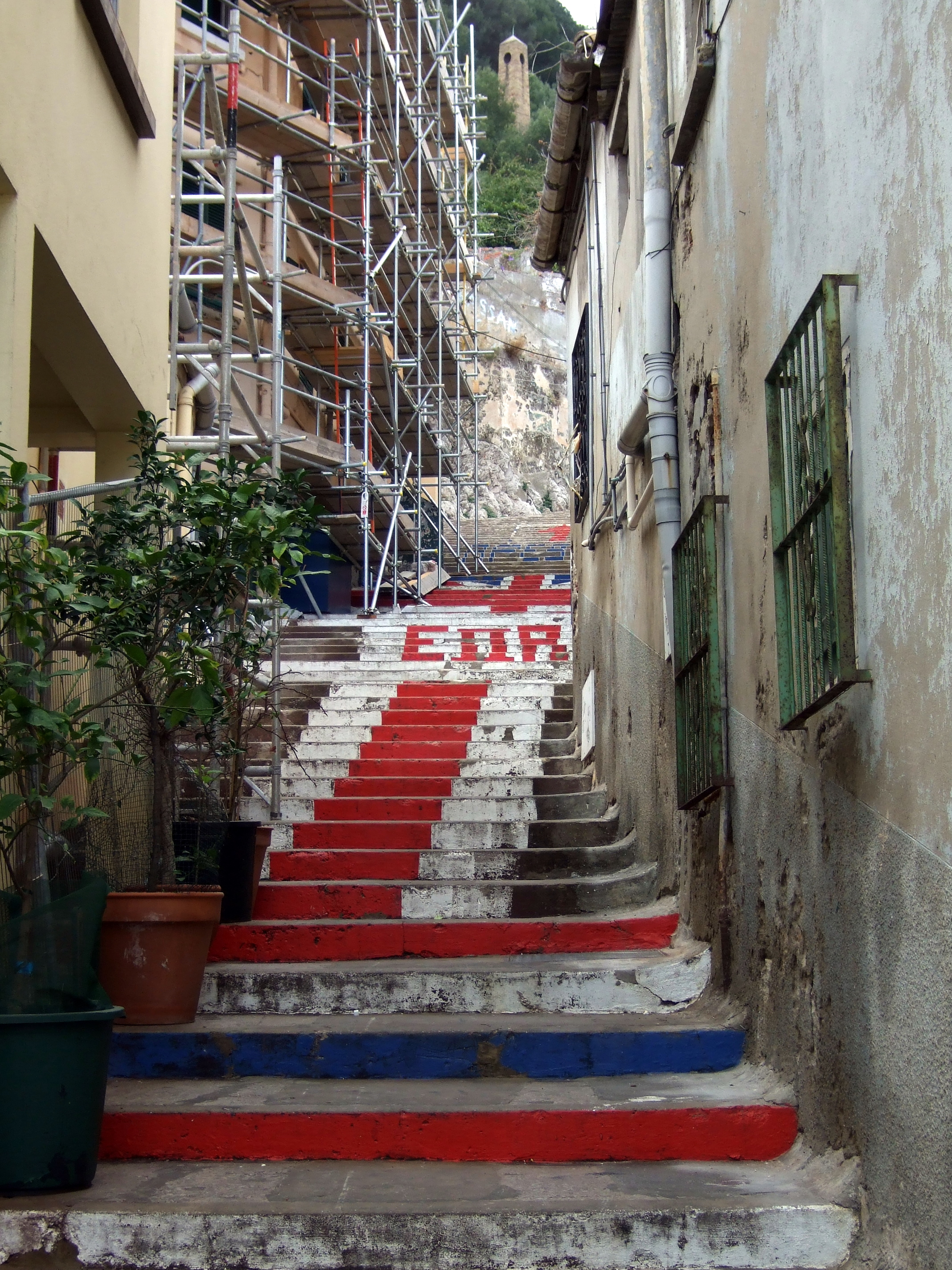
Devil's Gap Road in Gibraltar's Upper Town. The steps have been painted with the Union Flag ever since the referendum.

In response to continued pressure from Spain at the UN and a 1966 proposal from Spain on the transfer of sovereignty, a referendum on sovereignty was held in 1967. The referendum presented the following choices:

(a) To pass under Spanish sovereignty in accordance with the terms proposed by the Spanish Government to Her Majesty's Government on 18 May 1966; or
(b) Voluntarily to retain their link with Britain, with democratic local institutions and with Britain retaining its present responsibilities.

Although Spain was given the opportunity to explain its proposals it declined to do so. Nevertheless, it was widely covered in the Spanish media (available in Gibraltar), so the proposals were well known. The Special Committee on Decolonization was informed in advance of the referendum and invited to observe. The invitation was declined and instead the UN General Assembly passed Resolution 2353, which requested that the United Kingdom enter negotiations with Spain (then under the dictatorship of General Franco) and criticised the United Kingdom for holding a referendum. Resolution 2353 (XXII) was supported by seventy-three countries (mainly Latin American, Arab, African and Eastern European countries), rejected by nineteen (United Kingdom and the countries of the Commonwealth of Nations), while twenty-seven countries abstained (Western Europe and the United States).

The results of the referendum were emphatic, with a turnout of 95.67% Gibraltarians voted by 12,138 (99.64%) to 44 (0.36%) to remain under British sovereignty. The referendum is commemorated by Gibraltar National Day, celebrated annually on 10 September.

=== Gibraltar Constitution, 1969 ===
As a response to the 1967 sovereignty referendum, the British Government moved to increase democracy in Gibraltar with a new constitution. Some in Gibraltar pushed for even closer integration, pressing for Gibraltar to be formally integrated with the United Kingdom. However, the British Government declined that option, seeking to avoid "innovations which might make the development of a more favourable Spanish attitude to Gibraltar less likely". There was also opposition in Gibraltar as full integration would have resulted in a reduced role for the Government of Gibraltar.

The crucial feature of the 1969 Constitution for the Gibraltarians was the preamble to the Order in Council promulgating the Constitution, in its final form began:

Whereas Gibraltar is part of Her Majesty's dominions and Her Majesty's Government have given assurances to the people of Gibraltar that Gibraltar will remain part of Her Majesty's dominions unless and until an Act of Parliament otherwise provides, and furthermore that Her Majesty's Government will never enter into arrangements under which the people of Gibraltar would pass under the sovereignty of another state against their freely and democratically expressed wishes.

It has been pointed out that this preamble has been the "single most significant statement made on the sovereignty of Gibraltar since the signing of the Treaty of Utrecht". The 1969 Constitution remains the founding document for the Government of Gibraltar, it was modified in 2006 by the Gibraltar Constitution Order 2006.

=== Lisbon Agreement, 1980 ===
The 1969 Constitution made it clear that the British Government would not impose a solution on the Gibraltarians and acknowledged their right to self-determination in their own political future. Franco continued to insist that Gibraltar was territorially integral to Spain and "in a fit of diplomatic pique" ordered the closure of the Gibraltar–Spain border in 1969. For the next 16 years Gibraltar was primarily reliant on an air-link with the United Kingdom for formal access to the outside world. Gibraltarians visiting nearby Spanish relatives had first to take a ferry to Tangier, Morocco and then another to Algeciras, Spain.

It is also ironic that the actions taken by Francisco Franco and Spain completely destroyed any potential for winning over the population and gaining support in either Britain or Gibraltar for transfer of sovereignty to Spain... This natural tendency of the two populations to interact demonstrated the artificial division that had been created and continued to exist so long as Britain retained possession of Gibraltar. Instead, he demanded the immediate return of Gibraltar, initiated a newspaper campaign in which the entire population was characterised as criminals and individual of dubious moral character, and imposed border restrictions that caused real hardship on the inhabitants.

A diplomatic stalemate persisted until, following the death of Franco, Margaret Thatcher's government initiated a new political process that resulted in the Lisbon Agreement. This was a joint statement by the Spanish Foreign Minister Marcelino Oreja and the British Foreign Secretary Lord Carrington signed in Lisbon on 10 April 1980. The preamble stated:

The British and Spanish Governments desiring to strengthen their bilateral relations and thus to contribute to Western solidarity, intend, in accordance with the relevant United Nations Resolutions, to resolve, in a spirit of friendship, the Gibraltar problem.

=== Brussels Agreement, 1984 ===
The Brussels Agreement was concluded in November 1984 and implemented in February 1985. Spain's application to join the European Economic Community proved to be the key factor, as the United Kingdom linked Spain's membership with the opening of the border and threatened to veto the application. The agreement clarified and reactivated the earlier Lisbon Agreement, which had been subject to widely differing interpretation that had complicated Anglo-Spanish relations and delayed the full opening of the border. Under the Agreement, the United Kingdom and Spain would hold talks over Gibraltar, with the British prepared to negotiate on sovereignty. The Agreement was signed by the Foreign and Commonwealth Secretary, Rt. Hon. Sir Geoffrey Howe, and the Spanish Foreign Minister, His Excellency Sr. Don Fernando Morán López.

The Agreement was vocally criticised in Gibraltar as although the Government of Gibraltar was invited to participate, it was only as part of the United Kingdom delegation. Another major deficiency from the Gibraltar perspective was that it did not allow for the discussion of differences between Gibraltar and Spain. The Agreement was also criticised by Gibraltarian politicians as the Gibraltar delegation was expected to form part of:

the delegation of the colonising power from which it seeks in its own decolonisation.

— The Honourable Joe Bossano

In the key 1988 election, the Gibraltar Socialist Labour Party (GSLP) called for self-determination, expressed its opposition to the negotiations over the sovereignty and future of Gibraltar between Spain and the United Kingdom, and opposed to any transfer of sovereignty to Spain. It also asked for the withdrawal of the negotiations on the Brussels Declaration and opposed to the Airport Agreement. The GSLP got won 8 seats with a 58.2% of the popular vote.

The key points of the Brussels Agreement were:

- Provision of equality and reciprocity of rights for Spaniards in Gibraltar and Gibraltarians in Spain.
- The establishment of the free movement of persons, vehicles and goods between Gibraltar and the neighbouring territory.
- The establishment of a negotiating process aimed at overcoming all the differences between Spain and the United Kingdom over Gibraltar.

=== Evolving relationship with the United Kingdom ===
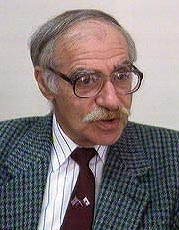
The Honourable Joe Bossano advocated a hard line stance on any negotiations with Spain over Gibraltar

The relationship between the United Kingdom and Gibraltar had always revolved around the need for Gibraltar as a British military base in the Mediterranean. In the 1980s, the United Kingdom continued to reduce its military commitments overseas and the military base in Gibraltar began to be downsized. Whereas previously 60% of the economy of Gibraltar depended upon the military base, this had reduced to less than 10% by 2004. The economy diversified into financial services and tourism and as dependence on the United Kingdom decreased, the Government of Gibraltar felt more able to demand a stake in negotiations on its future.

The 1980s and 1990s were a political and cultural watershed for Gibraltar. The idea of a loyal Gibraltar just waiting to see what its imperial master decided with regard to internal policies and external relations was well and truly relegated to the past.

While the full lifting of border restrictions in 1985 was significant and Spain transformed itself from a fascist state to a democracy, the legacy of Gibraltar's isolation by Franco continued to cast a shadow. Gibraltarian politicians and general public continued to distrust Spanish intentions, particularly while Spain refused to recognise the Government of Gibraltar as a competent authority and continued to pursue confrontational policies. Politicians such as Joe Bossano and Peter Caruana continued to demand that no political concessions be made to Spain.

== Developments in the 21st century ==
The British Government has continued with its policy of increasingly devolving governance to its Overseas Territories.

The UK Government's policy towards its Overseas Territories rests on the basis that it is the people of each territory who determine whether they wish to stay linked to the United Kingdom. The established policy of successive UK governments has been to give every help and encouragement to those territories which wish to proceed to independence, where it is an option.

=== White Paper, 1999 ===
British Overseas Territories or BOTs are not constitutionally part of the United Kingdom, rather they have separate constitutions set out in Orders in Council. While the constitutions promote self-government through elected Governments the United Kingdom has retained certain reserve powers. Previously constitutions were largely driven by the British Government, in 1999 the Government set out a White Paper to continue modernising the relationship with the United Kingdom and its Overseas Territories. The White Paper:

set out a "new partnership" between Britain and its Overseas Territories, based on four principles:

- self-determination, with Britain willingly granting independence where it is requested and is an option;
- responsibilities on both sides, with Britain pledged to defend the Overseas Territories, to encourage their sustainable development and to look after their interests internationally, and in return expecting the highest standards of probity, law and order, good government and observance of Britain’s international commitments;
- the Overseas Territories exercising the greatest possible autonomy; and
- Britain providing continued financial help to the Overseas Territories that need it.

As part of the White Paper, the British Government invited the British Dependent Territories (which in 2002 were renamed British Overseas Territories to mark the changing relationship) to provide proposals for constitutional reform.

=== Gibraltar sovereignty referendum, 2002 ===
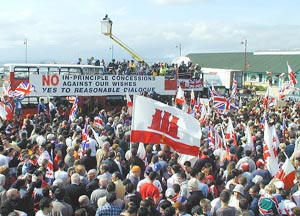
Demonstration of Gibraltarians against the joint-sovereignty proposals in 2002

While proposing constitutional reform, the British Government conducted secret talks with their Spanish counterparts under the framework established by the 1984 Brussels Agreement. These culminated in 2002 with an announcement by the then Secretary of State for Foreign and Commonwealth Affairs Jack Straw in the Houses of Parliament that both countries had agreed to share sovereignty over Gibraltar, provided that the Gibraltarians consented. The proposals received a hostile reception on the Rock and were resoundingly rejected in a second sovereignty referendum. The referendum asked Gibraltarians the following question:

On the 12th July 2002 the Foreign Secretary, Jack Straw, in a formal statement in the House of Commons, said that after twelve months of negotiation the British Government and Spain are in broad agreement on many of the principles that should underpin a lasting settlement of Spain's sovereignty claim, which included the principle that Britain and Spain should share sovereignty over Gibraltar.
Do you approve of the principle that Britain and Spain should share sovereignty over Gibraltar?

To deflect any potential criticism of the referendum, the Government of Gibraltar invited a panel of distinguished observers headed up by Gerald Kaufman, MP. Their published report confirmed that:

The observers were extremely impressed with the organisation of the referendum and particularly welcome that the role of the observers was integral to the process, as distinct from the more passive role of observers in other elections. The meticulous way in which votes were counted exceeded requirements and went beyond requirements adopted for UK elections

Nevertheless, the referendum was roundly condemned in Spain. For his part Jack Straw described the decision of the Government of Gibraltar to hold its own referendum on the prospect of shared sovereignty with Spain as "eccentric". With a turnout of 87.9%, Gibraltarians voted by 17,900 (98.48%) votes to 187 (1.03%) to reject shared sovereignty and there has been no further discussion on the subject. In his evidence to the Parliament of the United Kingdom Foreign Affairs Committee in 2008, Jim Murphy MP, Minister of State for Europe, stated:

The UK Government will never — "never" is a seldom-used word in politics – enter into an agreement on sovereignty without the agreement of the Government of Gibraltar and their people. In fact, we will never even enter into a process without that agreement. The word "never" sends a substantial and clear commitment and has been used for a purpose. We have delivered that message with confidence to the peoples and the Governments of Gibraltar and Spain. It is a sign of the maturity of our relationship now that that is accepted as the UK's position.

=== Gibraltar Constitution Order, 2006 ===
To examine proposals for constitutional reform stemming from the 1999 White Paper, a cross-party committee of the Gibraltar House of Assembly was set up to consult with interested parties and in January 2002 produced a report, which was subsequently debated and negotiated with the United Kingdom. The proposals for the reform were accepted by the Foreign and Commonwealth Office in March 2006 and unanimously approved in the Gibraltar House of Assembly in October.

The proposed constitution had been negotiated with the British Government by a delegation representing Gibraltar, comprising inter alia its Government, and Opposition.

Among changes introduced by the new constitution were:

- Renaming the House of Assembly to the Gibraltar Parliament.
- Renaming "Members of the House of Assembly" to "Members of Parliament" (MPs).
- Removal of the two remaining unelected members of the House of Assembly.
- Increasing the number of elected representatives from 15 to 17, with the parliament able to legislate to increase this number.
- Decreasing the Governor's powers, and transferring some of these to elected officials.
- Modernisation of the relationship between Gibraltar and the United Kingdom, without affecting the issue of sovereignty.
- A bill of "fundamental rights and freedoms" enshrined in the constitution.

A referendum on the proposed new constitution order was held on 30 November 2006. The motion proposed and approved was:

In exercise of your right to self-determination, do you approve and accept the proposed new Constitution for Gibraltar? YES NO

Turnout was 60.4% which was much lower than that the 87.9% achieved for the previous referendum on the shared sovereignty proposals but comparable to the 57.5% for the 2004 European Parliament election. 60.24% of votes cast were For the order and 37.75% of votes were Against. Although the proposed constitution had the support of all political parties a significant "No" movement emerged. Although reasons were diverse there were two aspects to objections; firstly the commitment to retaining British sovereignty was seen to not be sufficiently secure, secondly the new constitution was deemed not advanced enough in allowing the exercise of the right to self-determination. Joe Bossano, Leader of the Opposition, criticised the failure to phrase the preamble in a way that supported the maximum possible level of self-government.

As a result, the Gibraltar Constitution Order 2006 was approved, given effect by an Order in Council on 14 December 2006, and came into force on 2 January 2007. According to the British Government, it aimed to provide a modern and mature relationship not based on colonialism between Gibraltar and the United Kingdom.

=== Cordoba Agreement, 2006 ===
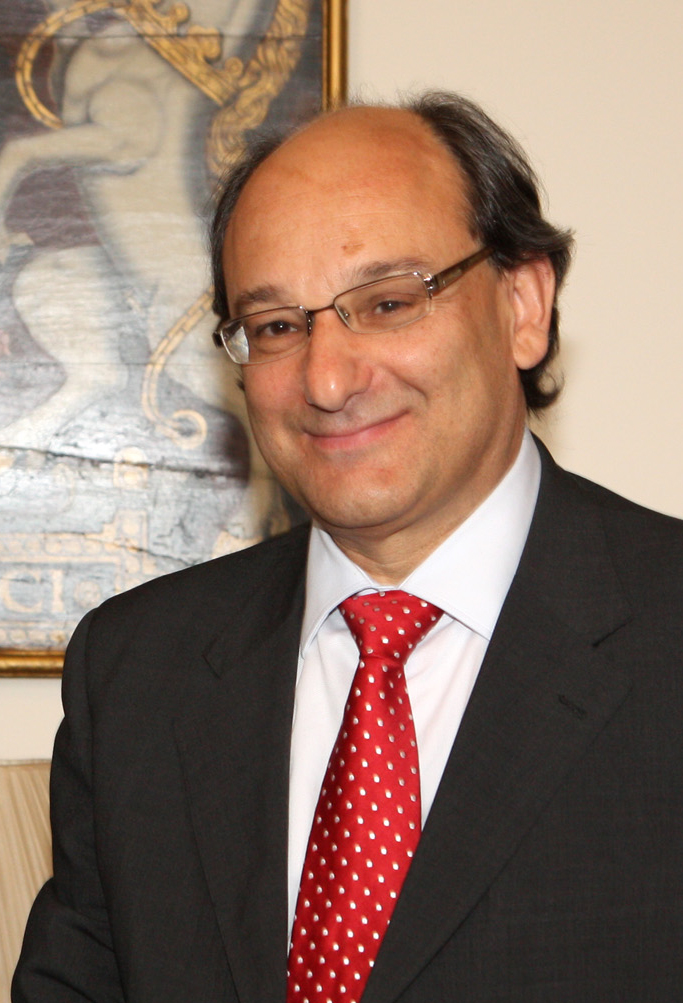
Sir Peter Caruana was Chief Minister of Gibraltar for over 15 years (1996–2011) and advocated for dialogue between the UK, Spain and Gibraltar while respecting each party's red lines

Also in 2006, after nearly two years of talks the Governments of Spain, the United Kingdom and Gibraltar signed a historic tripartite agreement, giving a voice to Gibraltar in talks between the United Kingdom and Spain for the first time. The Cordoba Agreement (also known as the Cordoba Accord or the Tripartite Agreement) stemmed from an initiative by the incoming Spanish socialist Government in 2004, which proposed a "Forum of Dialogue", in which for the first time Gibraltar would take part as an independent third party. The Agreement was signed by Spanish Foreign Minister Miguel Ángel Moratinos, British Minister for Europe Geoff Hoon and Gibraltar's Chief Minister Peter Caruana. The key agreements were:

- Flights between Spain and Gibraltar
- More phone lines into Gibraltar
- Lifting of limits on dialling Gibraltar from Spain and mobile roaming in Spain for Gibraltar mobile phones
- Dispute over pension payments to Spaniards who once worked in Gibraltar resolved
- Spain promised to reduce its border controls and ease movement across the frontier

The Agreement also established the "Tripartite Forum", with regular dialogue between the three parties. In July 2009, Moratinos attended talks in Gibraltar, making it the first time a Spanish Minister had ever done so. The Agreement has not been without criticism. Spanish newspaper El Mundo reported it as "a shameful moment in Spain's history" and Gibraltar's Panorama criticised the talks due to Moratino's role in the controversy of Gibraltar's territorial waters. The forum was designed to facilitate dialogue on a number of issues, putting the sovereignty issue to one side. An independent appraisal by Peter Gold concluded that "given the fundamental differences in the ultimate objectives of the Forum participants and in particular Spain's sensitivity to Gibraltar's status, the agreements may only prove to be a means of managing the Gibraltar 'problem' rather than resolving it." Spain has continued to insist it will only discuss sovereignty with the United Kingdom and not as part of the Tripartite Forum.

== Current Government of Gibraltar ==
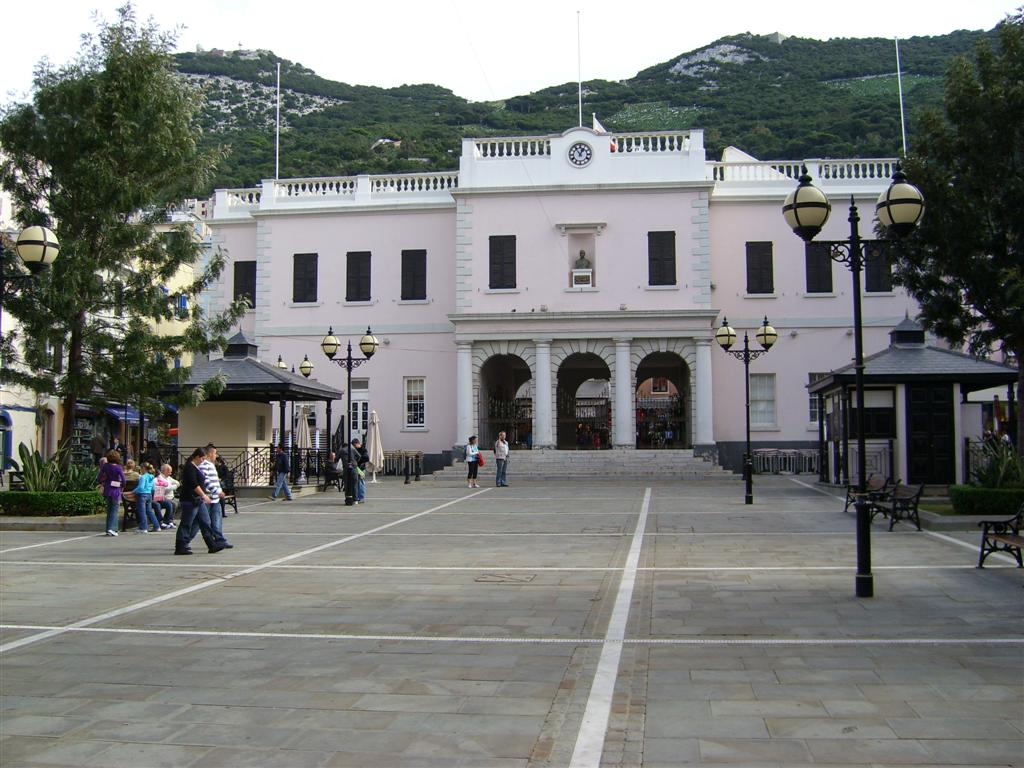
Gibraltar Parliament (formerly the House of Assembly)

The home of the Government of Gibraltar is the Gibraltar Parliament which was previously known as the Gibraltar House of Assembly between 1969 and 2006. This unicameral body consists of seventeen members elected by vote of the Gibraltar electorate and the Speaker. The Speaker is the only non-elected member and is appointed by a simple majority of the Members of Parliaments and presented by the Chief Minister after consulting with the Leader of the Opposition. The Speaker does not have a vote and vacates the position when Parliament is dissolved. The Chief Minister is the Elected Member who leads the political party with the largest majority and is formally appointed by the Governor.

Gibraltar is organised as a single constituency. Individual voters have up to 10 votes for their choice from all the candidates standing for election. Members are elected by popular vote to serve 4-year terms.

The role of the Governor of Gibraltar is mainly symbolic as the representative of the head of state, King Charles III. With each successive constitution the role of the Governor has been reduced. Under the current constitution, the Government of Gibraltar is responsible for all matters except defence, foreign policy, internal security and the judiciary. Formally defence, foreign policy and internal security are the responsibility of the Governor; judicial and other appointments are also made by the Governor on behalf of the King in consultation with the Chief Minister.

The Gibraltar Police Authority is responsible for internal security and policing in Gibraltar. It is independent of the Parliament and is composed of a chairman and seven members acting on the advice of the Specified Appointments Commission, together with one member appointed by each of the Governor and Chief Minister. Reflecting English Common Law and Acts, Gibraltar has had an independent judiciary and Supreme Court of Justice since the 1830 Charter of Justice. Gibraltar remains dependent upon the United Kingdom for foreign relations and defence.

The political development of modern Gibraltar has often been hampered by its role as a fortress and the relationship between the United Kingdom and Spain but from the 1960s onward there has been an important change in the political and cultural profile of Gibraltar. While the connection with the United Kingdom remains significant, Gibraltar has attained a highly developed but unquestionably differentiated political voice.
