= Executive Council of Gibraltar =

Former executive body of colonial Gibraltar (1922–2007)

Executive Council of Gibraltar Gibraltar Council (since 1964)

Overview
- Established: 1922
- Dissolved: 2 January 2007
- Polity: Gibraltar
- Leader: President
- Leader Name: The Governor
- Appointed by: The Crown
- Main organ: Council of Ministers
- Responsible to: Legislative Council

The Executive Council of Gibraltar was the principal executive and advisory body of the British colonial administration of Gibraltar for much of the twentieth century. First established in 1922, it advised the Governor in the exercise of his executive authority. Over four decades it developed from a largely official, Governor-dominated body into one that gave elected Gibraltarians a growing share in the conduct of their own internal affairs. Under the constitutional reforms of 1964 it was renamed the Gibraltar Council, the name under which the executive body continued to function thereafter. It survived the Gibraltar Constitution Order 1969 in that form, and was finally abolished by the Gibraltar Constitution Order 2006, which came into force on 2 January 2007; its executive role passed to the Government of Gibraltar: the Crown, represented by the Governor, together with the Council of Ministers.

== Origins ==
Gibraltar had been a British possession since its capture in 1704 and was declared a Crown Colony in 1830, but for most of that period executive and legislative power rested almost entirely with the Governor, who was also Commander-in-Chief of the fortress. Civilian political life developed slowly and was consistently constrained by Gibraltar's overriding strategic role as a military stronghold.

The push for civilian representation grew out of the merchant community, whose Exchange Committee (founded in 1817) had long pressed for a voice in the colony's administration. The end of the First World War, in which Gibraltar had served as a vital assembly point for Allied convoys, created both goodwill towards the Gibraltarians and a desire in London to modernise the colony. This produced two connected reforms: the creation of an elected City Council in 1921 to handle municipal affairs, and the establishment of the Executive Council in 1922 to advise the Governor on the government of the colony.

During the Second World War the machinery of civil government was set aside. In 1941 the Governor assumed the full powers of the City Council and the Executive Council was suspended, while the great majority of the civilian population was evacuated to Britain, Madeira, Jamaica and elsewhere. The restoration of civilian institutions after the war, and the return of the evacuees, gave fresh impetus to Gibraltarian political consciousness and to demands for a more representative form of government.

== Under the 1950 Constitution ==
The restoration of civilian government proceeded in stages. Under a 1944 constitution the City Council was enlarged and an Advisory Council was created (comprising the whole City Council together with the Colonial Secretary and the Attorney-General) as an interim consultative body. The framework for a new Legislative Council and a revived Executive Council was then set out in a letter from the Colonial Secretary to the Governor on 4 August 1949, and given effect by Gibraltar's first written Constitution in 1950, the colony remaining a Crown Colony. The new Legislative Council, in which legislative power was vested for the first time, was inaugurated by the Duke of Edinburgh on 23 November 1950.

Alongside the Legislative Council, the Executive Council was revived as the colony's executive organ, advising the Governor. At its post-war establishment it was to be largely responsible for framing the colony's legislative programme, and comprised three unofficial members, at least one of whom was to be drawn from the Legislative Council. Presided over by the Governor as President, the Council combined official and elected members: by the early 1960s its ex officio members were the Deputy Fortress Commander, the Permanent Secretary, the Attorney-General and the Financial Secretary, together with four elected members drawn from the Legislative Council. Executive authority remained legally vested in the Governor, who in practice acted on the advice of the Council in most matters of internal government while retaining reserved powers over defence, security and other matters of imperial concern. The composition deliberately preserved an official majority, reflecting the continuing priority given to Gibraltar's fortress status.

=== The Council of Members ===
Operating alongside the formal Executive Council was an arrangement known as the Council of Members. In 1962 the British Government agreed to its establishment, allowing much of the Executive Council's work to be transferred to a body made up of the elected members who had by then become associated with different areas of administration. This marked the beginning of a system under which executive power was divided between two councils, moving away from the classic colonial model of a single Executive Council. In practice the arrangement let those elected members who also sat on the Executive Council discuss domestic questions referred to them by the Governor before formal consideration and ratification by the full Executive Council; combined with the convention by which members were "associated" with individual departments, it gave Gibraltarian politicians practical experience of executive responsibility before such roles were placed on a statutory footing. Reflecting this trend, the Governor observed in a 1962 despatch to the Secretary of State for the Colonies that, unlike most fortresses, Gibraltar's population already had a large say in its government through parliamentary institutions, and that practice went further than the constitutional instruments alone suggested.

== Transformation into the Gibraltar Council (1964) ==
A revised Constitution came into force in August 1964, the product of talks held in Gibraltar in April of that year between Lord Lansdowne, the Minister of State for Colonial Affairs, and the unofficial members of the Legislative Council. It was given legal effect by the Gibraltar Constitution Order 1964, published in the Gibraltar Gazette on 7 August 1964, which revoked the earlier Letters Patent and orders (beginning with the Gibraltar Letters Patent 1950) that had introduced the Legislative Council. The declared purpose of the changes was to enable the people of Gibraltar to enjoy fuller control of their internal affairs, achieved by reshaping both the legislative and the executive branches.

The reform transformed the executive machinery in three connected ways:

- The Executive Council was renamed the Gibraltar Council. Under sections 12–13 of the 1964 Constitution the body, presided over by the Governor, was composed of the Deputy Fortress Commander, the Permanent Secretary to the Government of Gibraltar (the post formerly styled Chief Secretary, and before 1963, Colonial Secretary), the Attorney-General and the Financial Secretary, together with five elected members of the Legislative Council. Raising the number of elected members from four to five meant that, for the first time, elected members outnumbered the appointed officials on the Council, creating an unofficial majority.
- The office of Chief Minister was created. The post previously styled Chief Member was renamed Chief Minister. Of the five elected members, the Chief Minister was the one who, in the Governor's judgment, was most likely to command the greatest measure of confidence among the other elected members; the remaining elected members of the Council were appointed by the Governor after consultation with the Chief Minister, who also became Leader of the House and was vested with the direction of government business.
- The Council of Members became the Council of Ministers. The old Council of Members was formally converted into a Council of Ministers, presided over by the Chief Minister. Elected members associated with departments now became responsible Ministers. Under section 14(3) of the 1964 Constitution the Council of Ministers existed to make recommendations to the Gibraltar Council on any matter for which a Minister was responsible and on any other matter referred to it by the Gibraltar Council. The accompanying despatch from the Foreign Secretary explained that, while the Governor in Council could refer any matter to the Council of Ministers, business within Ministers' responsibility would normally go direct to it, and its recommendations on purely domestic matters would as a general rule be endorsed by the Governor in Council.

Following the first elections held under the new Constitution in September 1964, a Council of Ministers consisting of the Chief Minister and five other Ministers was formed. While Ministers were collectively responsible to the Legislative Council for the matters with which they were charged, the general direction and control of the government were vested in the Gibraltar Council. The Gibraltar Council was thus, in effect, the "Government of Gibraltar".

== Functions and character ==
Throughout its existence the Executive Council, and its successor the Gibraltar Council, served as the body through which the Governor exercised executive authority. It was consultative and collective in character: the Governor was normally expected to seek its advice, but he retained wide reserved powers, particularly over defence and internal security, and could act against the Council's advice provided he reported the fact to the Secretary of State. The Governor was not obliged to consult the Council on matters affecting his reserved powers, or on matters of minor importance, and he retained a veto over legislation.

This dual arrangement, combining an executive body headed by the Governor with a Council of Ministers led by an elected Chief Minister and responsible for domestic affairs, established the essential shape of Gibraltar's internal self-government, balancing growing Gibraltarian control over civil administration against the Crown's continuing responsibility for the security of the fortress.

== The Gibraltar Council under the 1969 Constitution ==
A further round of constitutional talks in July 1968, chaired by Lord Shepherd, led, after Gibraltar's vote to remain British in the referendum of 10 September 1967, to the Gibraltar Constitution Order 1969, made on 2 May 1969, under which a new constitution was introduced on 11 August 1969 to build upon and replace that of 1964. It merged the Legislative Council and the City Council into a single House of Assembly and reorganised the colony's institutions, but retained the Gibraltar Council as the body through which the Governor exercised executive authority.

Under the 1969 Order, executive authority was vested in the Governor on behalf of the Sovereign and was to be exercised by them either directly or through subordinate officers. The Gibraltar Council remained a body composed of ex officio senior officials and nominated Ministers. The Governor was required to consult the Gibraltar Council in the formulation of policy and in the exercise of powers conferred on him, though this obligation did not extend to domestic matters, and in any case he could act alone if he judged it necessary; they were separately required to consult the Council of Ministers, and was not absolutely bound by the advice of either body. By the early 1970s the Council's ex officio side comprised the Deputy Governor, the Deputy Fortress Commander, the Attorney-General and the Financial and Development Secretary, alongside the Chief Minister and four other elected Ministers appointed by the Governor after consultation with the Chief Minister.

In practice, successive Governors allowed Gibraltarians as much discretion as possible, and the Gibraltar Council met on very few occasions. Day-to-day domestic government was instead conducted by the Council of Ministers, which met regularly under the chairmanship of the Chief Minister, who was required to keep the Governor informed of its work. The Gibraltar Council thus became, over time, a largely formal survival of the older executive machinery rather than an active organ of government.

As head of the executive the Governor administered Gibraltar acting generally on the advice of the Gibraltar Council, though in exceptional circumstances they retained special powers to refuse advice that, in his view, was not in the interests of maintaining financial and economic stability. As late as April 2004, shortly before the Council's abolition, it remained constituted on this basis: presided over by the Governor (then Sir Francis Richards), with the Deputy Governor, the Land Forces Commander, the Attorney-General and the Financial and Development Secretary as ex officio members, together with the Chief Minister and four other elected Ministers designated by the Governor after consultation with the Chief Minister.

== Abolition ==
By the turn of the century Gibraltar sought to shed its remaining colonial characteristics and to be removed from the United Nations list of Non-Self-Governing Territories. An all-party Select Committee on Constitutional Reform was established to review the 1969 Order, and it reported on 23 January 2002. Among its recommendations were that the Government of Gibraltar should be defined as the Council of Ministers and that the Gibraltar Council should be abolished; it also proposed that the office of Financial and Development Secretary should cease to be a constitutional office.

These recommendations were substantially carried into the Gibraltar Constitution Order 2006, which came into force on 2 January 2007 and replaced the constitution of 1969. The 2006 Constitution makes no provision for a Gibraltar Council: executive authority instead vests in the Crown and may be exercised by the Government of Gibraltar, which consists of the Crown (represented in Gibraltar by the Governor) together with the Council of Ministers, comprising the Chief Minister and at least four other Ministers. With this reform the Gibraltar Council, the direct descendant of the Executive Council established in 1922, ceased to exist.

== See also ==
- Government of Gibraltar
- Gibraltar Legislative Council
- City Council of Gibraltar
- Governor of Gibraltar
- Constitution of Gibraltar
- Gibraltar Parliament
- Politics of Gibraltar
- Crown colony
