= 1959 Gibraltar general election =

- 24 September 1959
- 7 seats in the Legislative Council; 4 seats needed for a majority
Party	Leader	Vote %	Seats	+/–
AACR	Joshua Hassan	41.95	3	−1
TGWU		11.50	1	New
Independents	–	46.55	3	+1
This lists parties that won seats. See the complete results below.
Speaker of the Legislative Council before	Speaker of the Legislative Council after
Joseph Patron; Independent	Joseph Patron; Independent

General elections were held in Gibraltar on 23 September 1959. The Association for the Advancement of Civil Rights remained the largest party in the legislature, winning three of the seven elected seats.

== Electoral system ==
The legislature was elected by single transferable vote.

== Campaign ==
A total of 13 candidates contested the elections; four for the Association for the Advancement of Civil Rights, four representing the Transport and General Workers' Union and five independents.

== Results ==
Party	Votes	%	Seats	+/–
Association for the Advancement of Civil Rights	3,583	41.95	3	–1
Transport and General Workers' Union	982	11.50	1	New
Independents	3,976	46.55	3	+1
Total	8,541	100.00	7	0
Source: Garcia, Parliament

=== Elected members ===
Member	Party
Anthony Baldorino Jnr	Transport and General Workers' Union
Dorothy Ellicott	Independent
Joshua Hassan	Association for the Advancement of Civil Rights
Peter Isola	Independent
Albert Risso	Association for the Advancement of Civil Rights
Abraham Serfaty	Association for the Advancement of Civil Rights
Solomon Seruya	Independent
Source: Garcia, Parliament
