= 1964 Gibraltar general election =

- 11 September 1964
- 11 seats in the Legislative Council; 6 seats needed for a majority
- Turnout: 76.25%
| Party | Leader | Seats | +/– |
|---|---|---|---|
| AACR | Joshua Hassan | 5 | +2 |
| Independents | – | 6 | +3 |
This lists parties that won seats. See the complete results below.
| Chief Minister before | Chief Minister after |
|---|---|
| Joshua Hassan; AACR | Joshua Hassan; AACR |

General elections were held in Gibraltar on 11 September 1964. (Note: The poll date is given as 11 September 1964 by the Parliament of Gibraltar's published results, but as 9 September 1964 by the 1967 Gibraltar: Report and as 10 September 1964 by Garcia.) The Association for the Advancement of Civil Rights (AACR) remained the largest party in the legislature, winning five of the eleven seats.

== Background ==
Gibraltar was a British colony whose status was increasingly contested at the United Nations, where from 1957 Spain recorded an annual reservation asserting that the territory formed an integral part of Spain. The Special Committee on Decolonization considered Gibraltar for the first time in 1963, holding hearings from 11 September at which Spain relied on the principle of territorial integrity in Resolution 1514, while Gibraltar's elected representatives argued for self-determination and continued association with Britain. Gibraltar was represented by the Chief Member and leader of the Association for the Advancement of Civil Rights, Joshua Hassan, together with the independent member Peter Isola; although opponents in local politics, the two took a common position on the territory's future.

The Gibraltar Constitution Order 1964, announced on 10 April 1964 and brought into force that August, advanced the devolution of internal powers, enlarged the elected membership of the Legislative Council and replaced the office of Chief Member with that of Chief Minister. The election held that September was therefore the first at which Gibraltarians elected a government exercising internal self-rule rather than representatives to scrutinise a British-run administration, and it produced a record turnout. Weeks after the poll, on 16 October 1964, the Special Committee adopted a consensus inviting the United Kingdom and Spain to begin negotiations over the territory.

== Electoral system ==
The eleven elected members were returned from a single territory-wide constituency by the single transferable vote. The Legislative Council had first been established in 1950 with five elected members, a total that was subsequently increased to seven. Under the Gibraltar Constitution Order 1964, which granted the territory a wider measure of internal self-government, the number of elected members was increased to eleven. Alongside the elected members, the reconstituted council comprised a Speaker and two ex officio members, the Attorney-General and the Financial Secretary, while the office of Chief Member was retitled Chief Minister. Under the single transferable vote the Association for the Advancement of Civil Rights habitually nominated only as many candidates as it expected to win, so as not to split its own vote; at the 1953 election, for example, it put forward three candidates for the five seats then available.

== Results ==
| Party | Votes | % | Seats | +/– |
|---|---|---|---|---|
| Association for the Advancement of Civil Rights | | | 5 | +2 |
| Independents | | | 6 | +3 |
| **Total** | | | **11** | **+4** |
| Valid votes | 10,106 | 97.72 | | |
| Invalid/blank votes | 236 | 2.28 | | |
| Total votes | **10,342** | **100.00** | | |
| Registered voters/turnout | 13,564 | 76.25 | | |
Source: McHale, Gibraltar: Report

=== By candidate ===
A total of 10,106 valid votes were cast and the quota for election was 843 votes. Four candidates (Hassan, Isola, Seruya and Russo) exceeded the quota on the first count, and their surpluses were distributed over the following counts. The eleven elected candidates and the vote total at which each reached the quota are shown in bold, with the order in which they were declared elected given in brackets. The returning officer's sheet recorded only names and votes; the party affiliations shown below largely follow Garcia, and those of three candidates (Triay, Chiappe and Mor) have not been identified.

| Candidate | Party | First preferences | | Subsequent counts | | | | | | | | | | |
| Candidate | Party | First preferences | | 2 | 3 | 4 | 5 | 6 | 7 | 8 | 9 | 10 | 11 | 12 |
|---|---|---|---|---|---|---|---|---|---|---|---|---|---|---|
| J. A. Hassan (1) | AACR | 4,603 | 45.55 | 843 | 843 | 843 | 843 | 843 | 843 | 843 | 843 | 843 | 843 | 843 |
| P. J. Isola (2) | Independent | 1,822 | 18.03 | 1,822 | 843 | 843 | 843 | 843 | 843 | 843 | 843 | 843 | 843 | 843 |
| S. A. Seruya (3) | Independent | 916 | 9.06 | 916 | 916 | 843 | 843 | 843 | 843 | 843 | 843 | 843 | 843 | 843 |
| P. G. Russo (4) | Independent | 878 | 8.69 | 878 | 878 | 878 | 843 | 843 | 843 | 843 | 843 | 843 | 843 | 843 |
| A. J. Risso (5) | AACR | 52 | 0.51 | 2,602 | 2,602 | 2,602 | 2,602 | 843 | 843 | 843 | 843 | 843 | 843 | 843 |
| L. W. Triay (6) | | 366 | 3.62 | 568 | 849 | 849 | 849 | 849 | 843 | 843 | 843 | 843 | 843 | 843 |
| A. J. Baldorino (7) | Independent | 507 | 5.02 | 660 | 789 | 810 | 815 | 834 | 835 | 900 | 843 | 843 | 843 | 843 |
| A. V. Stagnetto (8) | Independent | 327 | 3.24 | 421 | 625 | 646 | 660 | 686 | 689 | 726 | 734 | 868 | 843 | 843 |
| A. W. Serfaty (9) | AACR | 35 | 0.35 | 181 | 215 | 219 | 221 | 693 | 693 | 709 | 710 | 734 | 736 | 1,099 |
| A. P. Montegriffo (10) | AACR | 38 | 0.38 | 218 | 246 | 247 | 248 | 716 | 716 | 730 | 732 | 755 | 757 | 809 |
| M. E. Chiappe (11) | | 52 | 0.51 | 183 | 206 | 208 | 210 | 543 | 543 | 557 | 566 | 622 | 625 | 700 |
| Peralta | Independent | 196 | 1.94 | 286 | 377 | 388 | 392 | 410 | 411 | 446 | 463 | 531 | 548 | 563 |
| Mor | | 18 | 0.18 | 102 | 114 | 115 | 115 | 514 | 514 | 522 | 524 | 546 | 547 | |
| D. M. Ellicott (Note: Ellicott contested the election as an independent, having left the AACR in the early 1950s.) | Independent | 145 | 1.43 | 235 | 369 | 377 | 382 | 401 | 402 | 438 | 452 | | | |
| Chamberland (Note: Chamberland had been one of the original members of the AACR but resigned from the party in January 1963.) | Independent | 151 | 1.49 | 191 | 234 | 238 | 240 | 245 | 245 | | | | | |
| **Total** | | **10,106** | **100.00** | **10,106** | **10,106** | **10,106** | **10,106** | **10,106** | **10,106** | **10,086** | **10,082** | **9,957** | **9,957** | **9,915** |
| Valid votes | | 10,106 | 97.72 | | | | | | | | | | | |
| Invalid votes | | 236 | 2.28 | | | | | | | | | | | |
| Total votes | | **10,342** | **100.00** | | | | | | | | | | | |
| Registered voters/turnout | | 13,564 | 76.25 | | | | | | | | | | | |
Source: Gibraltar: Report
