= Gibraltar Constitution Order 1950 =

1950 constitution of Gibraltar

King George VI in Council
- Long title: An Order providing for the constitution of a Legislative Council for Gibraltar
- Territorial extent: Gibraltar
- Enacted by: King George VI in Council
- Commenced: 3 February 1950

Amended by
- Gibraltar (Legislative Council) (Amendment) Order in Council 1956; Gibraltar (Legislative Council) (Amendment No. 2) Order in Council 1956

Repealed by
- superseded by later constitutional instruments (see Legacy)

Related legislation
- Parliament Act (Act No. 1950-15); Gibraltar Election Rules
- Status: Repealed

The Gibraltar Constitution Order 1950, formally the Gibraltar (Legislative Council) Order in Council, was the constitutional instrument that established the first Legislative Council in the British colony of Gibraltar. It came into effect on 3 February 1950. Together with the accompanying Gibraltar Election Rules, it ended the Governor's monopoly of legislative authority and, for the first time, introduced directly elected members into the law-making of the territory. The new Legislative Council was inaugurated by the Duke of Edinburgh on 23 November 1950.

It was Gibraltar's first written constitution. The Governor nonetheless retained wide reserved powers, reflecting Gibraltar's status as a fortress as well as a colony, and the elected members formed only a minority of the Council. The constitutional arrangements introduced in 1950 were subsequently re-enacted and consolidated by a Gibraltar (Constitution) Order in Council, cited in later instruments as S.I. 1952/2031, and were amended repeatedly before the Legislative Council was eventually replaced under the Gibraltar Constitution Order 1969.

The Order provided the constitutional framework only; the detailed electoral machinery — the franchise, the conduct of elections and election offences — was contained in ordinary legislation that survives, much amended, as the Parliament Act (Act No. 1950-15), and in the accompanying Election Rules.

== Naming ==
The instrument is commonly referred to as the "Gibraltar Constitution Order 1950" and is listed as such among Gibraltar's constitutions, but its formal title was the Gibraltar (Legislative Council) Order in Council; the descriptive "Constitution Order" style is more strictly associated with the later 1969 and 2006 instruments. (Note: The exact Statutory Instrument number of the 1950 Order has not been confirmed for this article. A later consolidating instrument is cited in the notes to the 2006 Constitution as S.I. 1952/2031, amended by S.I. 1956/731, 1963/88, 1964/267 and others.)

== Background ==
Civilian political life in Gibraltar developed rapidly during and after the Second World War evacuation of the civilian population. The Association for the Advancement of Civil Rights (AACR), founded in 1942 and led by Joshua Hassan, harnessed the Gibraltarian working class and in 1945 secured a City Council with an elected majority. The Association then pressed for a colony-wide legislature.

The British government was cautious. When Attlee's Cabinet considered constitutional reform for Gibraltar in the late 1940s, opinion in Whitehall was largely opposed to conceding a legislature, and officials argued that any elected element would have to be balanced by an official presence and by reserved powers for the Governor, given the importance of the fortress to imperial defence. A draft constitution circulated for consultation in 1949 was criticised by the AACR, the Chamber of Commerce and others, chiefly over the composition of the proposed Council, restrictions on the introduction of money bills, and the adoption of proportional representation. The reforms were also entangled with a contemporaneous dispute over the introduction of a Trades Tax.

== Provisions ==
The Order established a Legislative Council chaired by the Governor and made up of ex officio (official) members, nominated members and five members directly elected by proportional representation using the single transferable vote. The Governor retained the power to legislate and a range of reserved powers over matters such as defence and the strategic use of the fortress. An Executive Council advised the Governor, with provision for unofficial members, some of whom could be drawn from the Legislative Council.

Since the elected members were a minority whose competence was limited, the AACR regarded the settlement as falling short of the fully elected legislature it ultimately sought; the Association reminded voters that they were electing representatives to a council with restricted powers rather than choosing a government.

== First election and inauguration ==
The first elections to the Legislative Council were held in November 1950, with nine candidates contesting the five elected seats. Contrary to expectations, the independent conservative Albert Isola topped the poll, followed by Francis Panayotti, Albert Risso and Joshua Hassan of the AACR, and Major Joseph Patron; turnout was about 53%. The elections were the first of any kind in Gibraltar in which women could vote. The Governor, General Kenneth Anderson, subsequently named two nominated members, and the elected members Isola and Risso, together with the nominated member Henry Coelho, were appointed to the Executive Council.

The Legislative Council was officially inaugurated by the Duke of Edinburgh on 23 November 1950 and held its first sitting on 15 December 1950. Its creation was regarded as a significant achievement for a fortress-colony and marked the point from which Gibraltar's elected representatives began to share in the government of the territory.

== Amendments ==
The 1950 framework was amended several times in the mid-1950s. The amending instruments were not statutory instruments and were printed in the appendix of instruments not registered as S.I. in the annual volume of Statutory Instruments.

The Gibraltar (Legislative Council) (Amendment) Order in Council 1956, made on 23 February 1956, inserted a new section 17A allowing the privileges, immunities and powers of the Council and its members to be determined by law, subject to the limit that they could not exceed those of the House of Commons, and requiring the Governor to reserve any such bill for the signification of Her Majesty's pleasure unless authorised to assent.

The Gibraltar (Legislative Council) (Amendment No. 2) Order in Council 1956, made on 3 August 1956 and brought into operation on 10 August 1956, substantially reshaped the Council. It replaced the provision on composition so that the Council consisted of the Governor as President, a Speaker (if appointed), three ex officio members, two nominated members, seven elected members and any temporary members, increasing the elected element from five to seven. It also created the office of Speaker and revised the rules on presiding and voting in the Council.

Two related instruments adjusted the wider constitutional structure. The Gibraltar (Amendment) Letters Patent 1955, published in Gibraltar on 10 February 1956, provided for the appointment of a successor to the Governor, or to another office-holder, who was on leave of absence pending relinquishment of office. Additional Instructions to the Governor dated 23 August 1956 reconstituted the Executive Council to comprise four ex officio members—the Deputy Fortress Commander, the Colonial Secretary, the Attorney-General and the Financial Secretary—together with four unofficial members and any temporary members.

== Legacy ==
The 1950 constitution provided the base from which Gibraltar's constitutional development proceeded over the following two decades. The arrangements were consolidated by a Gibraltar (Constitution) Order in Council of 1952 (S.I. 1952/2031) and amended through the 1950s and 1960s. Constitutional changes taking effect in 1964 increased the elected membership, abolished the nominated members and introduced a ministerial system with a Chief Minister and a Council of Ministers. The Legislative Council was in turn merged with the City Council to form the House of Assembly under the Gibraltar Constitution Order 1969, which superseded the earlier framework.

== See also ==
- Constitution of Gibraltar
- Parliament Act
- Gibraltar Constitution Order 1964
- Gibraltar Constitution Order 1969
- Gibraltar Constitution Order 2006
- History of Gibraltar
- Politics of Gibraltar
