= Solomon Seruya =

Israeli diplomat

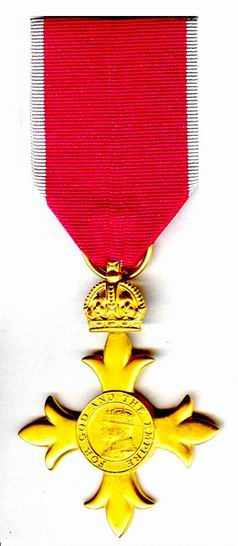
OBE decoration

Solomon Abraham Seruya (Hebrew: סולומון סרויה; 1926 – 2015) was a Gibraltarian-Israeli politician, diplomat and businessman.

== Life ==
Scion of Italian Sephardic Jews, Seruya was educated at Talmud Torah Hebrew School in Gibraltar, St Andrews and Madrid (UCL international student).

Seruya was elected to the Gibraltar Legislative Council in 1956, when ten candidates contested seven seats: those elected being Joshua Hassan, Abraham Serfaty, John Alcantara and Albert Risso, all of the Association for the Advancement of Civil Rights, one Commonwealth Party candidate, Joseph Triay, and two Independents, Peter Isola and Seruya.

Solomon Seruya went on to serve as Tourism and Ports Minister of Gibraltar from 1965 until 1969.

In 1969 Seruya immigrated to Israel living in Jerusalem until 1983, and served on the United Israel Appeal as well as Israeli Ambassador to the Philippines (1976–78).

Returning to Gibraltar in 1981 to take over the family business, Seruya maintained a home in Jerusalem where one of his daughters lives.

His granddaughter, Sarah Sackman MP for Finchley and Golders Green, is the eldest daughter of Donna Seruya-Sackman.

== Honours ==
- : OBE for "public services in Gibraltar" (1991);
- : OMC for "la voluntad de diálogo y de entendimiento" over 50 years in politics (2008).

== See also ==
- Gibraltar House of Assembly
