= Gibraltar Constitution Order 1964 =

1964 constitution of Gibraltar

Gibraltar (Constitution) Order 1964

Queen-in-Council
- Long title: An Order providing a new constitution for Gibraltar
- Territorial extent: Gibraltar
- Enacted by: Queen Elizabeth II in Council
- Commenced: 1 August 1964

Repealed by
- Gibraltar Constitution Order 1969
- Status: Repealed

The Gibraltar Constitution Order 1964, formally the Gibraltar (Constitution) Order 1964, was an Order in Council that provided a new constitution for the British colony of Gibraltar. It came into force on 1 August 1964 and introduced ministerial government to the territory, replacing the Chief Member of the legislature with a Chief Minister and creating a Council of Ministers whose members were placed in charge of government departments. The Order gave Gibraltar a substantial measure of internal self-government, while the Governor retained reserved powers over defence, external affairs and internal security.

Because it enlarged Gibraltar's autonomy, the new constitution was strongly opposed by Spain, which raised the matter before the United Nations Special Committee on Decolonization. The Order was superseded five years later by the Gibraltar Constitution Order 1969, which followed the 1967 sovereignty referendum.

== Background ==
Gibraltar's modern constitutional development began with the establishment of an elected Legislative Council in 1950. Over the following decade the Association for the Advancement of Civil Rights (AACR), the colony's dominant political movement led by Sir Joshua Hassan, pressed for the introduction of a ministerial system based on the Westminster model of government and opposition. The AACR had set out this demand in a memorandum submitted to the Secretary of State for the Colonies, Alan Lennox-Boyd, in October 1955, and successive incremental reforms during the late 1950s and early 1960s gradually enlarged the role of elected members in the administration of the territory.

The question of Gibraltar's status acquired an international dimension in September 1963, when the sovereignty dispute with Spain and the future of the colony were brought before the United Nations Committee of 24 on decolonisation. Spain, which had renewed its claim to Gibraltar annually since joining the UN in 1956, argued that the territory was a piece of Spanish soil under British administration rather than a colonised people entitled to self-determination. It was against this background that the drive for further internal constitutional reform continued.

== Constitutional conference ==
On 30 January 1964 the British government announced that the Secretary of State, Duncan Sandys, had studied proposals for constitutional change submitted by the AACR and by independent members of the legislature, and that Lord Lansdowne, Minister of State for Colonial Affairs, would travel to Gibraltar in April to take the matter forward.

The reforms again drew a Spanish protest. On 5 March 1964 Britain informed Madrid that it did not accept that Spain had any rights over Gibraltar, since all rights had been ceded under the Treaty of Utrecht, but acknowledged that Spain had an "interest" in the colony and accordingly notified it of the planned changes, describing them as intended only to improve the efficiency of Gibraltar's institutions rather than to increase their powers. Spain replied on 6 April, before the conference opened, opposing the reforms and asking Britain to hold them back pending the resumption of the UN's examination of the Gibraltar question later that year. Britain proceeded regardless.

At the end of a short conference with the members of the legislature, Lord Lansdowne announced agreement on ten points.

== Provisions ==
The principal changes introduced by the Order were:

- The number of elected members of the Legislative Council was increased from seven to eleven.
- No further nominated unofficial members would sit in the legislature; only the Financial Secretary and the Attorney General remained as ex officio members, a ratio of two appointees to eleven elected members.
- The number of elected members sitting in the Executive Council was increased from four to five, and that body was renamed the Gibraltar Council.
- The office of Chief Member was renamed Chief Minister, and the Council of Members became the Council of Ministers.
- Ministers, appointed by the Governor after consultation with the Chief Minister, became fully responsible for government departments, and were placed under collective responsibility for decisions of the Council of Ministers and the Gibraltar Council.
- The Chief Minister became Leader of the House, charged with the direction of government business.
- The Chief Secretary ceased to be a member of the legislature and was retitled Permanent Secretary, remaining head of the civil service but losing his former central role in the legislature.
- The Governor retained reserved powers over matters such as defence and external affairs, together with a power to withhold assent to bills — a caveat common to colonial constitutions of the period.
- The future of the City Council was deferred, to be decided early in the life of the next legislature.

Commentators have described the settlement as a clear victory for the AACR, which secured most of the reforms it had sought since 1955 while deferring those it opposed. The reforms gave the Gibraltarians complete internal self-government, with elected ministers in control of government departments and local leaders, rather than expatriate heads of department, setting domestic policy.

== Implementation and first general election ==
The new constitution was promulgated in July 1964 and came into effect on 1 August 1964; its text was published in the Gibraltar Gazette on 7 August 1964.

Elections to the eleven seats in the reconstituted Legislative Council were held on 11 September 1964. With the United Nations due to consider Gibraltar again later that month, political interest was high and turnout reached 76%, the first occasion on which Gibraltarians had voted to elect a government rather than merely to choose representatives to scrutinise British officials. Of the fifteen candidates contesting the eleven seats, five AACR members and six independents were returned. Since the result was produced by proportional representation, the AACR could not govern alone; after several days of negotiation the independent Peter Russo joined forces with the Association, allowing Sir Joshua Hassan to become Gibraltar's first Chief Minister, with Peter Isola as Leader of the Opposition.

== International reaction ==
The extension of Gibraltar's internal self-government prompted renewed Spanish objections. At Spain's request the constitutional changes were examined by the UN Special Committee on Decolonization (the Committee of 24) during its consideration of Gibraltar in 1963 and 1964. Spain disputed the identity of the Gibraltarians, presenting petitioners from the neighbouring town of San Roque who described themselves as descendants of the inhabitants who had left the Rock after its capture in 1704 and characterised the modern population as an artificial community implanted by Britain to serve its military base. Hassan and Isola, appearing as petitioners, rejected these arguments and appealed for recognition of the Gibraltarians' right to self-determination. The Committee reached no conclusion in 1963 and, in 1964, called for a negotiated solution in conformity with Resolution 1514 (XV) while bearing in mind the interests of the people of the territory.

== Legacy ==
The 1964 constitution remained in force until it was replaced by the Gibraltar Constitution Order 1969. That later constitution, published on 30 May 1969, followed the 1967 Gibraltar sovereignty referendum, in which Gibraltarians voted overwhelmingly to retain their link with Britain, and the constitutional conference of 1968 chaired by Lord Shepherd. The House of Commons Library has described the 1969 Order as amending the 1964 Order in Council. Whereas the ministerial reforms of 1964 were the outcome of a long domestic campaign and had little to do with the dispute with Spain, the 1969 changes were largely a direct response to the escalating conflict with Madrid. In turn, the 1969 constitution was superseded by the Gibraltar Constitution Order 2006.

== See also ==
- Constitution of Gibraltar
- Gibraltar Constitution Order 1950
- Gibraltar Constitution Order 1969
- Gibraltar Constitution Order 2006
- History of Gibraltar
- Politics of Gibraltar
