= Gibraltar Legislative Council =

Legislature of Gibraltar from 1950 to 1969

- Coat of arms of Gibraltar

Type
- Type: Unicameral

History
- Established: 3 February 1950
- Disbanded: 30 May 1969
- Preceded by: Governor-in-Council
- Succeeded by: Gibraltar House of Assembly

Leadership
- Presiding officer: Governor (as President, 1950–1958); Speaker (from 1958)
- Seats: 5 elected and 5 unelected (1950–1953); 7 elected and 5 unelected (1956–1959); 11 elected and 2 unelected (1964) (Note: The figures exclude the presiding officer—the Governor, sitting as President, until 1958 and the Speaker thereafter.)

Elections
- Voting system: Single transferable vote

Meeting place
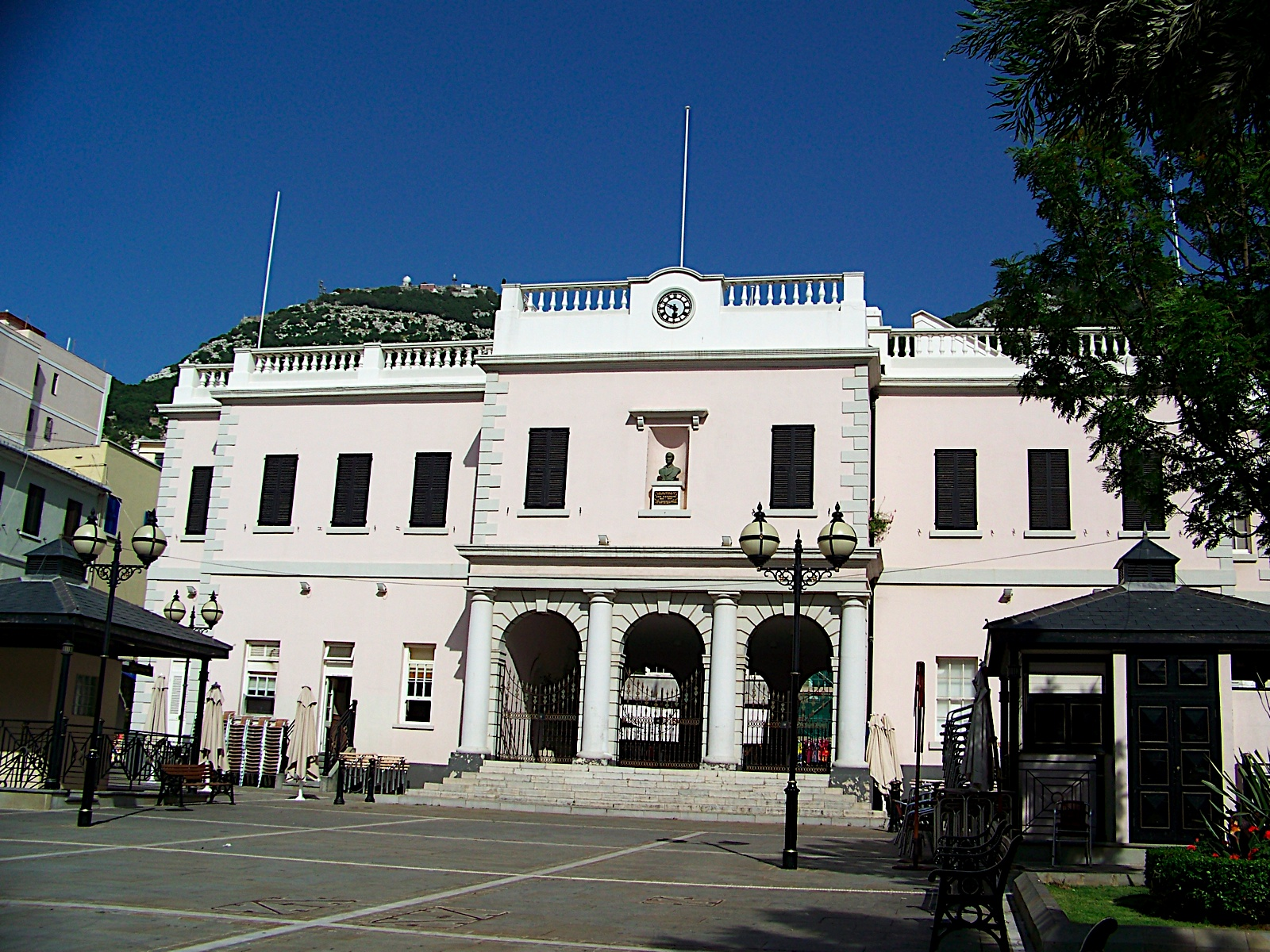
- Legislative Council Building, John Mackintosh Square, Gibraltar

The Gibraltar Legislative Council was the legislature of Gibraltar from 1950 until 1969, when it was replaced by the Gibraltar House of Assembly. Its creation marked the beginning of representative government in the then Crown colony, and successive reforms to its membership and powers formed the main stages in Gibraltar's move towards internal self-government during the 1950s and 1960s.

== Background and establishment ==
Before 1950 legislative power in Gibraltar rested with the Governor-in-Council, and there was no elected body responsible for law-making. Civilian representation had previously been confined to local matters through the City Council.

The Legislative Council was established in 1950, giving Gibraltarians a directly elected voice in the government of the territory for the first time. It was constituted by the Gibraltar (Legislative Council) Order in Council, which came into force on 3 February 1950, following a 1948 visit to the Rock by the Minister of State for Colonial Affairs, Lord Listowel. It was formally inaugurated by the Duke of Edinburgh on 23 November 1950, and held its first business meeting on 16 December 1950. The creation of an elected legislature in Gibraltar also prompted renewed objections from Spain, marking the start of the post-war tensions over the territory's disputed status. The Chief Minister Sir Joshua Hassan later described the creation of the first Legislative Council in 1950 as the point at which the process of decolonisation began in Gibraltar.

The Council sat in the building overlooking Main Street and John Mackintosh Square that had been erected by public subscription in 1817 and had formerly housed the Exchange and Commercial Library. The building was refurbished in 1951 to accommodate the Legislative Council, and it remained the home of the legislature until the merger of 1969; it continues to house the Gibraltar Parliament.

== Composition and reform ==
As originally constituted in 1950, the Council comprised the Governor as President; three ex officio members (the Colonial Secretary, the Attorney-General and the Financial Secretary); two members nominated by the Governor, at least one of whom had to be unofficial; and five elected unofficial members, returned by single transferable vote, a form of proportional representation. The Governor could also summon any official to sit as a non-voting Extraordinary Member, and nominated and elected members normally held their seats until the Council was dissolved, which took place at least every three years. Policy-making authority rested not with the legislature but with a separate Executive Council—composed of four ex officio and three unofficial members appointed by the Governor—on which the Governor retained control; the first appointments to it were announced on 12 December 1950, all three unofficial members being Gibraltarian members of the Council. The number of elected members was increased to seven for the 1956 election and to eleven for the 1964 election, progressively giving the elected members a majority in the chamber.

The "member system", begun in 1954 and extended after 1957, associated the unofficial members with the running of government departments but gave them no executive control, leaving them with departmental responsibilities but little real power. On 27 June 1958 Sir Joseph Patron was sworn in as the legislature's first Speaker, replacing the Governor as presiding officer. Provision for a Chief Member—the leader of the unofficial members and a forerunner of the office of Chief Minister—was made in 1959, the post first being held by Joshua Hassan following that year's election.

Under the Gibraltar (Constitution) Order in Council 1964, the territory was granted a wide measure of internal self-government, and control over the civil service and over domestic policy was vested for the first time in an elected Government of Gibraltar. The reforms followed a conference held in April 1964 with the Minister of State for Colonial Affairs, Lord Lansdowne, at which agreement was reached on ten points of constitutional change. The Council was reconstituted to consist of a Speaker, two ex officio members (the Attorney-General and the Financial Secretary) and eleven elected members, the nominated members being abolished. The Chief Member was restyled Chief Minister and Leader of the House, responsible for the management of government business, and elected members holding departmental responsibilities became known as ministers, each carrying full responsibility for his department. Sir Joshua Hassan became the territory's first Chief Minister on 11 August 1964.

The former Executive Council was enlarged—its elected membership rising from four to five—and re-designated the Gibraltar Council, comprising four ex officio members (the Deputy Fortress Commander, the Permanent Secretary to the Government, the Attorney-General and the Financial Secretary) together with five elected members of the Legislative Council appointed by the Governor after consultation with the Chief Minister. The Council of Members, an inner body set up in 1962 to handle much of the day-to-day work of the Executive Council, was likewise renamed the Council of Ministers; chaired by the Chief Minister, it dealt with matters within the responsibility of the elected ministers, and on matters of purely domestic concern the Governor normally acted on its advice. The principle of collective responsibility applied to both bodies, while the British Government retained responsibility for defence and external affairs.

The move towards full internal self-government was reinforced by the 1967 Gibraltar sovereignty referendum, in which Gibraltarians voted overwhelmingly to retain their link with Britain, and by the Constitutional Conference of 1968 chaired by Lord Shepherd, whose recommendations led to the 1969 constitution.

== Powers and franchise ==
The Council could consider and dispose of any Bill or motion relating to the "peace, order and good government" of the colony, but no measure creating a charge on public funds or affecting taxation could proceed without the Governor's consent. The Governor held reserved powers to enact any measure without the Council's agreement where he judged it expedient in the interests of public order, public faith or good government, any such exercise being reported to the Secretary of State for the Colonies. All legislation required the Governor's assent and remained subject to disallowance by the Crown, and Bills of certain classes could not be assented to without the Crown's prior concurrence.

Elections and the franchise were governed by the Elections Ordinance 1950 (No. 15 of 1950). The franchise was held by adult British subjects and citizens of the Republic of Ireland who had been ordinarily resident in Gibraltar for at least twelve months, with provision for electors who had spent part of the qualifying period in neighbouring Spanish territory; members of the Armed Forces not domiciled in Gibraltar were excluded. Voting was by proportional representation using the single transferable vote, although this system was not used for City Council elections.

== Elections ==
Elections were initially held every three years; in 1959 the term of the Council was extended from three to five years, so that the Council elected in 1959 sat until the general election of 1964. Voting used the single transferable vote, a form of proportional representation. Throughout the Council's existence the Association for the Advancement of Civil Rights (AACR), led by Joshua Hassan, was the largest party.

General elections to the Gibraltar Legislative Council
Election	Elected seats (Note: The bars show the elected members as a proportion of the Council's ordinary membership. The remaining seats were held by ex officio members and, until they were abolished in 1964, by members nominated by the Governor; the totals exclude the presiding officer. The figures for 1956 and 1959 assume the numbers of official and nominated members were unchanged from 1950.)	Largest party
1950	5 / 10	AACR (3 seats)
1953	5 / 10	AACR (3 seats)
1956	7 / 12	AACR (4 seats)
1959	7 / 12	AACR (3 seats)
1964	11 / 13	AACR (5 seats)

Source: Gibraltar Parliament, Parliamentary Election Results.

At the first elections, held on 8 November 1950, (Note: The Gibraltar Parliament's records give the dates on which results were declared, generally a day or two after polling: it records 9 November 1950 for the first election against the polling date of 8 November given by T. J. Finlayson and the Colonial Office, and likewise 21 September 1956 (poll 19 September) and 24 September 1959 (poll 23 September). The 1953 election shows a larger discrepancy: Finlayson and other historians place it in September 1953, whereas the Parliament's records give 17 November 1953.) nine candidates contested the five elective seats; 7,214 votes were cast from an electorate of 13,564, a turnout of about 53%. The poll was topped by the Independent barrister A. R. Isola.

The election of 21 September 1956 was the first in which elected members formed a majority of the Council. Ten candidates contested the seven elected seats on a turnout of 58.2 per cent. The winners were Joshua Hassan, Abraham Serfaty, J. E. Alcantara and Albert Risso, all of the AACR; two Independents, Solomon Seruya and Peter Isola; and one Commonwealth Party candidate, Joseph Triay.

== 1955 constitutional crisis ==
A constitutional crisis arose in 1955 over the introduction of import duties. On 27 July the Financial Secretary proposed a 10% ad valorem duty on a range of goods, which the Council rejected by six votes to four, one of the nominated members siding with the five elected members. The Governor, Sir Harold Redman, nonetheless used his reserved powers to bring the duties into force. In protest the five elected members resigned in September; the Secretary of State for the Colonies, Sir Alan Lennox-Boyd, visited Gibraltar and, while upholding the Governor's action, agreed that the Standing Finance Committee should have greater say in revenue matters. The five members were returned unopposed at the ensuing by-election.

== Demise ==
The Legislative Council was responsible for overall affairs, while local issues were dealt with by the City Council of Gibraltar. Amid pressure at the United Nations, the British government merged the Legislative Council and the City Council into a single House of Assembly under the Gibraltar Constitution Order 1969, which came into force on 30 May 1969, giving Gibraltar wider domestic powers over its own affairs while reducing the Governor's role in day-to-day government. The House of Assembly first met following the general election of 30 July 1969.

== Members ==
The head of the legislature was initially the Governor, sitting as President. From 1958 the Governor was replaced as presiding officer by a Speaker drawn from the membership of the Council. The leader of the elected majority was known as the Chief Member and, from 1964, as the Chief Minister. Both the office of President and that of Speaker were held by British appointees who were not Gibraltarians.

=== Presidents ===
Name	Start term	End term	Notes
General Sir Kenneth Anderson, KCB, MC	1950	1952	First President; Governor and Commander-in-Chief
Lieutenant General Sir Gordon MacMillan, KCB, CBE, DSO, MC	1952	1955	Governor and Commander-in-Chief
General Sir Harold Redman, KCB, CBE	1955	1958	Last President; Governor and Commander-in-Chief

=== Speakers of the Legislative Council ===
Name	Start term	End term	Notes
Major Sir Joseph Patron, OBE, MC, JP	1958	1964	
Colonel William Thompson, OBE, JP	1964	1969	

=== Clerks of the Legislative Council ===
- E.H. Davis Esq. OBE, 1950–1961
- J.L. Pitaluga Esq. MBE, 1961–1969

=== Elected members ===
The elected members of the Council were returned by single transferable vote. Notable members included the AACR leader and later Chief Minister Sir Joshua Hassan; Peter Isola; Albert Risso; Abraham Serfaty; Solomon Seruya; and Luis Francis Bruzon. Dorothy Ellicott became the first woman to be elected to the Legislative Council when she won a seat in 1959; she had earlier become the first woman elected to the City Council, in 1947.

== See also ==
- City Council of Gibraltar
- Executive Council of Gibraltar
- Gibraltar Parliament
- Elections in Gibraltar
- Politics of Gibraltar
