= Sarah Sackman =

British barrister and politician (born 1984)

Sarah Sackman KC MP
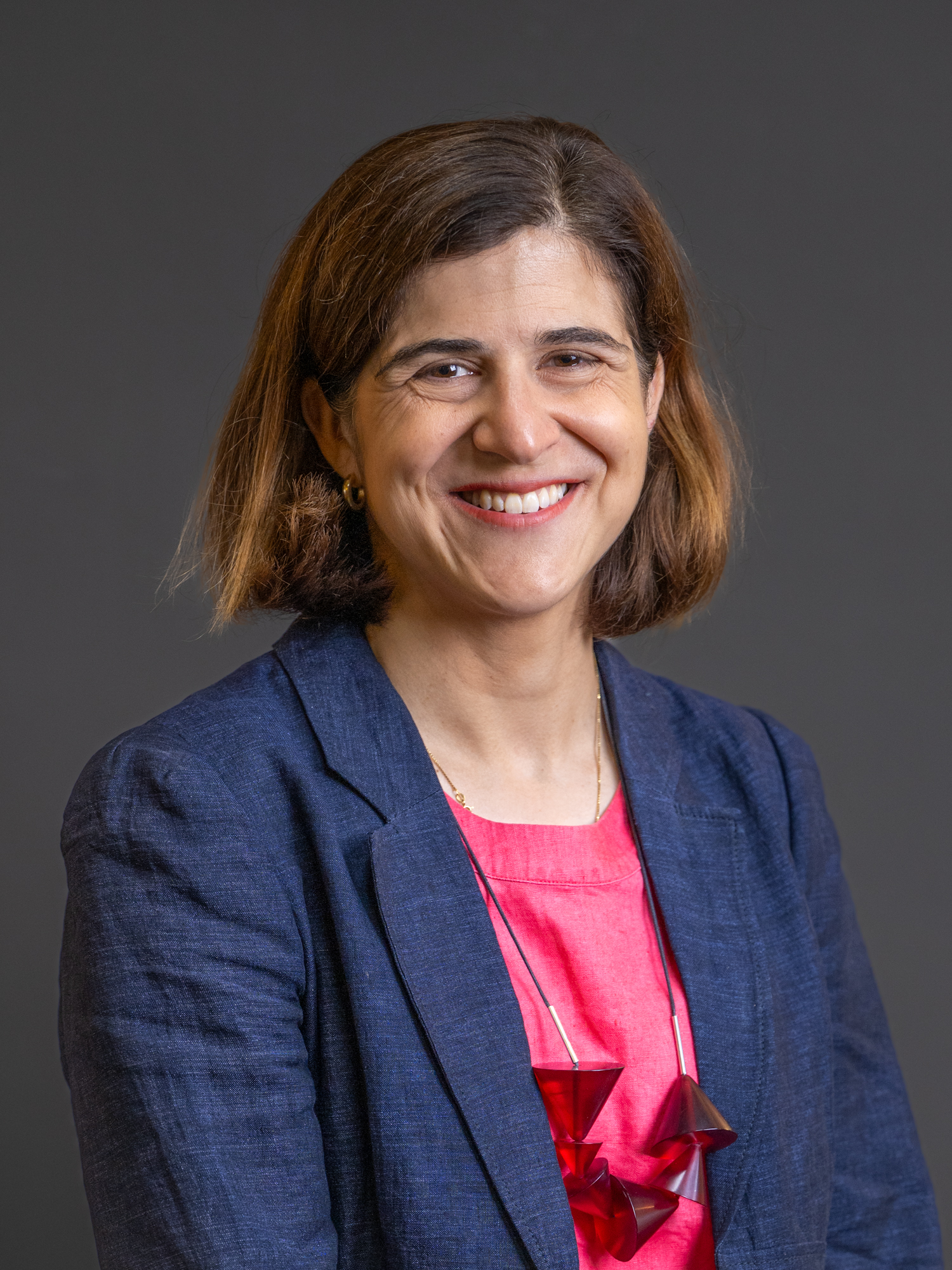
- Official portrait, 2025

Minister of State for Courts and Legal Services
- Incumbent
- Assumed office 2 December 2024
- Prime Minister: Keir Starmer; Andy Burnham
- Preceded by: Heidi Alexander

Solicitor General for England and Wales
- In office 9 July 2024 – 2 December 2024
- Prime Minister: Keir Starmer
- Preceded by: Robert Courts
- Succeeded by: Lucy Rigby

Member of Parliament for Finchley and Golders Green
- Incumbent
- Assumed office 4 July 2024
- Preceded by: Mike Freer
- Majority: 4,581 (9.2%)

Personal details
- Born: Sarah Rebecca Sackman; October 1984 (age 41–42) London, England
- Party: Labour
- Spouse: Dan Squires
- Relations: Solomon Seruya (grandfather); Simon Sackman (father)
- Children: 2
- Education: Queens' College, Cambridge (MA); Harvard University (LLM)
- Website: sarahsackman.com

Sarah Rebecca Sackman KC MP (born October, 1984), is a British Labour politician and barrister. She has served as Member of Parliament (MP) for Finchley and Golders Green since July 2024, and as the Minister of State for Courts and Legal Services since December 2024. She was HM Solicitor General for England and Wales from July until December 2024.

== Early life and education ==
Sarah Rebecca Sackman was born in 1984, and raised at East Finchley, London. Her father, Simon Sackman, a partner in City solicitors Norton Rose Fulbright, is of Eastern European Jewish descent who settled in East London, now living at Hampstead Garden Suburb in North London with his wife, Donna Seruya-Sackman. The eldest daughter of former Minister for Economic Development of Gibraltar and independent MHA the Hon. Solomon Seruya, her mother's Sephardic Jewish family had moved from Tarragona in Spain via Italy and Morocco to Gibraltar, where they own a 150-year old perfumery.

Sackman was privately educated at South Hampstead High School, becoming head girl. She went up to Queens' College, Cambridge to read history, graduating with a first-class degree in 2006 (BA, proceeding MA). Then pursuing postgraduate legal studies, Sackman received a Graduate Diploma in Law with distinction from City University (2007), then LLM from Harvard Law School (2011) specialising in cities, housing, local government and poverty law.

== Legal career (2008–2024) ==
Sackman was awarded a judicial clerk scholarship at the Supreme Court of Israel in Jerusalem, being called to the Bar at the Inner Temple in November 2008. From October 2008 Sackman practised as a junior barrister and housing expert at Francis Taylor Building, chambers specialising in planning law.

In 2013, Sackman received human rights training from the British Council in Yangon, Burma. In 2017 the Markaz El-Tathgheef El-Eslami group (MTE) bought Golders Green Hippodrome with the intention of converting it into a mosque. There were a number of objections from residents who cited concerns such as parking and congestion but some opposed the move on the grounds of an Islamic centre being located in an area (Golders Green) with a large Jewish population. Sackman, acting for MTE, said it was hard to see how it had "not been treated differently to other religious groups who have previously used the building." In 2021 Hillsong Church purchased the venue.

Sackman contributed a chapter to Community-Led Generation – A Toolkit for Residents and Planners by Professor Pablo Sendra and Dr Daniel Fitzpatrick on using the law to challenge redevelopment through the courts; the book was published in 2020.

Between September 2021 and 2024 Sackman practised as a barrister at Matrix Chambers alongside Richard Hermer (now Lord Hermer, who served as Attorney General for England and Wales between July 2024 and July 2026). There she worked on a number of cases mainly focused on public and environmental law.

In 2022 Sackman worked on the appellant team in R (on the application of Coughlan) v Minister for the Cabinet Office against HMG Voter ID trials, arguing that this pilot scheme was unlawful under the Representation of the People Act (2000); the appeal was dismissed by the Supreme Court on the grounds that Section 10 enabled pilot schemes subject to Government encouragement of voter turnout where reduction in voter fraud increased voter confidence.

== Early political career ==
=== 2015 general election ===
At the 2015 general election, Sackman stood as the Labour parliamentary candidate for Finchley and Golders Green, being selected ahead of Alon Or-Bach and Cate Tuitt MBE. Sackman unsuccessfully contested the seat losing to the Conservative Party incumbent Mike Freer, who was returned as MP with a majority of 5,662 votes.

Vice-Chair of the Jewish Labour Movement between 2015 and 2024, Sackman delivered a speech in 2016 on the battle of Cable Street's 80th anniversary.

=== 2024 general election ===
At the 2024 election, Sackman was reselected as the Labour Party candidate for Finchley and Golders Green, ahead of Councillor Arjun Mittra, standing on a platform of supporting economic growth particularly for small businesses by: cutting business rates and freezing energy prices; investing in skills and grants to provide work for unemployed young people; giving more money in the NHS, including a new system for caring for the elderly; and getting more police back on the streets. She held that a Labour Government would continue to regard British ties with Israel as important but must advocate a negotiated peace with the Palestinians and "for democratic values".

Backed by a number of Labour grandees including former Prime Minister Gordon Brown, future Prime Minister Keir Starmer and Chancellor Rachel Reeves, Sackman was elected to parliament with a majority of 4,581 votes defeating the Conservative candidate, Alex Deane.

In her victory speech on July 5 at the RAF Museum in Hendon, Sackman said community would "triumph over hate" with Labour's anti-Semitism record under the spotlight, and declared she would help to build: "a society where nurses aren't forced to visit foodbanks; where women and girls aren't afraid to walk home at night; where we act when we see the planet on fire, and where we welcome rather than demonise those, like my ancestors, who come to this country fleeing persecution."

== Member of Parliament (2024–present) ==
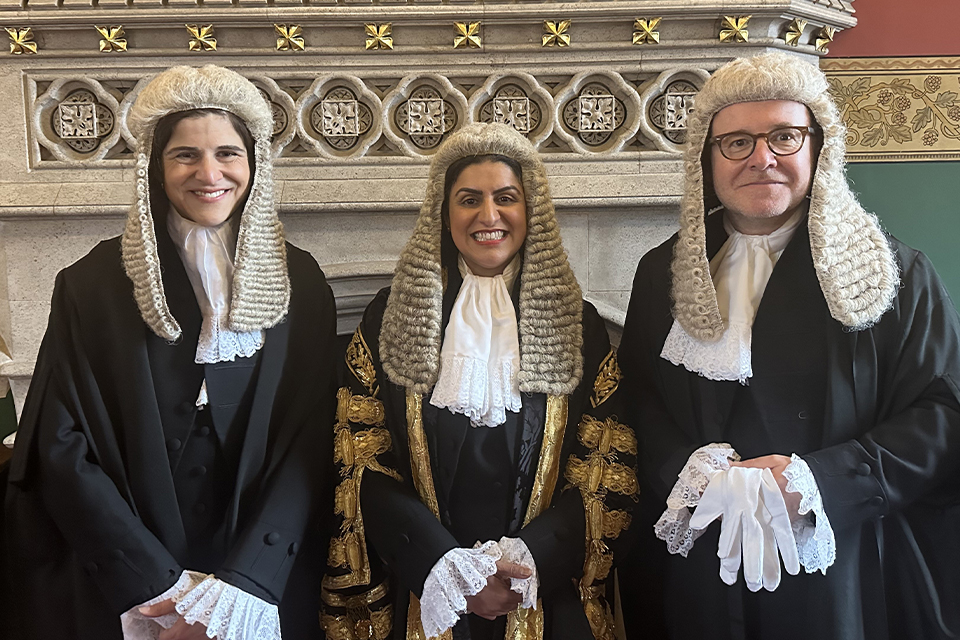
Sackman (left) being sworn in as Solicitor General, alongside Lord Chancellor Shabana Mahmood and Attorney General Richard Hermer, on 15 July 2024

Inside Housing listed Sackman among eight newly-elected MPs who would be advocates for social housing in the new Labour Government due to her experience in planning and environmental law and her work with the charity Shelter.

Appointed Solicitor General for England and Wales on 9 July 2024, Sackman swore the Oath of Allegiance on a Hebrew Bible, being informed that her preferred Hertz Chumash was not held in the House of Commons Library, and the 1743 edition of the Hebrew Bible was too delicate to take out from its collection.

In her maiden speech on 22 July 2024, Sackman paid tribute to her predecessor MP Mike Freer, and compared herself to another of her predecessors, Lady Thatcher, saying that, unlike Margaret Thatcher, she fundamentally believed in the existence and value of society. Sackman noted that, in recent times, some politicians have chosen to use "North Londoner" as an insult, but she and her constituents wear it as a badge of pride. Sackman promised to "tirelessly call out anti-Semitism and Islamophobia", and voiced support for the Bills in the 2024 King's Speech as a vehicle to restore British public services.

In response to the 2024 United Kingdom riots when Red Flare leaked messages from far-right wing Telegram groups naming North Finchley as a possible gathering place outside immigration law specialists, Sackman called such targeting "disgusting" and on the day of the planned riot convened a meeting of unity with Jewish and Muslim leaders to deepen community cohesion.

Securing additional funding in the 2024 UK Budget, for the Crown Prosecution Service to support Rape and Serious Sexual Offences (RASSO) teams, on 2 December 2024, after 146 days in office as Solicitor-General, Sackman was appointed Minister of State for Courts and Legal Services at the Ministry of Justice, following Louise Haigh's resignation from HM Cabinet with Heidi Alexander being promoted as Secretary of State for Transport.

In July 2026, she was reappointed to the new government in the Ministry of Justice by Andy Burnham.

=== Politics ===
==== Assisted-dying views ====
Sackman supported Kim Leadbeater's Private Member's Bill introducing assisted suicide into law and sat on the House of Commons Committee examining the legislation.

Publishing an open letter to her constituents on 28 November 2024 in support of the Terminally Ill Adults (End of Life) Bill, Sackman stated her central reason for supporting this Bill was respect for individual autonomy and she was struck by that in dying we have no control. Quoting Rabbi Jonathan Romain that the Bill is about shortening death, not shortening life – in her own words: "the right to choose is an expression of the liberty which is, in essence, what makes life so precious".

== Personal life ==
Sackman married, at Bevis Marks in the City, Deputy Judge Dan Squires, having two children.

A member of New North London Synagogue, Sackman served for four years as a parochial school governor in Camden and has also volunteered at the Toynbee Hall Free Legal Advice Centre.

=== Appointments ===
Elected a Visiting Fellow, in 2018 Sackman taught public law and urban politics at LSE Cities.

On 30 August 2024, upon being appointed as Solicitor-General, Sackman took silk, being appointed a King's Counsel (KC).

== See also ==
- Ministry of Justice

Parliament of the United Kingdom
Preceded by Mike Freer	Member of Parliament for Finchley and Golders Green; 2024–present	Incumbent
Legal offices
Preceded by Robert Courts	Solicitor General for England and Wales; 2024–2024	Succeeded by Lucy Rigby
