= Constitution of Gibraltar =

Fundamental law of Gibraltar

Gibraltar Constitution

Overview
- Jurisdiction: Gibraltar
- Subordinate to: United Kingdom
- Ratified: 14 December 2006
- Date effective: 2 January 2007
- System: Devolved parliamentary dependency under a constitutional monarchy

Government structure
- Branches: Three (executive, legislature, judiciary)
- Chambers: One (Gibraltar Parliament)
- Executive: Chief Minister and Council of Ministers
- Judiciary: Supreme Court and Court of Appeal; final appeal to the Judicial Committee of the Privy Council
- Supersedes: Gibraltar Constitution Order 1969

The Gibraltar Constitution is a predominantly codified constitution documented primarily within the Gibraltar Constitution Order 2006, an Order in Council of the United Kingdom. The constitution, in its present form, was made on 14 December 2006 by Queen Elizabeth II in a meeting of the Privy Council at Buckingham Palace, having first been approved by the people of Gibraltar in a referendum held on 30 November 2006. It came into force on 2 January 2007, replacing the 1969 constitution.

According to the British government, the 2006 constitution was intended to establish a modern and mature relationship between Gibraltar and the United Kingdom that is not based on colonialism, while giving the people of Gibraltar the degree of self-government compatible with British sovereignty over the territory and with the United Kingdom remaining responsible for Gibraltar's external relations.

== History ==
Gibraltar was declared a Crown colony in 1830, and in 1921 a City Council was established to deal with municipal matters. In response to local demands for a greater say in government, Gibraltar's first Legislative Council was established in 1950 under the Gibraltar Constitution Order 1950, giving the civilian population a measure of representation; prior to this the Governor-in-Council had retained legislative power.

The move towards a legislature gathered pace after the Second World War. An announcement on 30 December 1944 proposed the creation of an Advisory Council, but this was set aside after representative bodies pressed instead for a legislative council; on 5 November 1945 the government announced that the Secretary of State was prepared to establish a Legislative Council as soon as circumstances permitted, though—given Gibraltar's status as a fortress—with an official majority over non-official members. After discussions continued through 1947, the Minister of State for Colonial Affairs, Lord Listowel, visited Gibraltar in September 1948, and in November 1948 the British government approved the establishment of a legislature, to comprise the Governor as president, three ex-officio members, two nominated members and five elected members. The constitutional instruments were prepared over the following year and a despatch setting out their principal features was published for public comment. The new constitution took the form of the Gibraltar (Legislative Council) Order in Council 1950, dated 3 February 1950, together with Letters Patent and Royal Instructions of 28 February 1950. The first elections, for the five elected seats, were held on 8 November 1950 under the Elections Ordinance 1950, which extended the franchise to all adult British subjects and citizens of the Republic of Ireland resident in Gibraltar for at least twelve months and provided for voting by proportional representation; the Legislative Council was inaugurated on 23 November 1950 by the Duke of Edinburgh.

The working of the 1950 constitution was tested in 1955, in what is regarded as the territory's first constitutional crisis. The Governor, General Sir Harold Redman, used his reserve powers to bring into force a 10% ad valorem import duty that the Legislative Council had rejected, prompting the five elected members to resign their seats in protest on 27 July 1955. The Secretary of State for the Colonies, Alan Lennox-Boyd, visited Gibraltar in October 1955 and, while upholding the Governor's decision, agreed that the legislature's finance committee would in future be consulted on revenue and that reserve powers would not be exercised again without prior reference to London. The five members were returned unopposed at a by-election in November 1955. No Governor has used the reserve powers since, and the episode gave impetus to the constitutional reforms of the following years.

The Gibraltar Constitution Order 1964 introduced a further measure of domestic self-government. Amid Spanish pressure for the "decolonisation" of Gibraltar, a sovereignty referendum was held in 1967 in which residents voted overwhelmingly to retain their link with Britain rather than pass under Spanish sovereignty.

Following that vote, the Gibraltar Constitution Order 1969 established the House of Assembly, which superseded the Legislative Council, together with a Council of Ministers headed by a Chief Minister. Under the 1969 constitution the House of Assembly consisted of a Speaker appointed by the Governor, fifteen elected members, and two ex officio members, including the Attorney-General. In 1981 Gibraltarians were granted full British citizenship under the British Nationality Act 1981.

In 1999 the United Kingdom invited its dependent territories to bring forward proposals for constitutional reform. A cross-party committee of the House of Assembly was established to consult interested parties, and in January 2002 it produced a report that was subsequently debated in Gibraltar and negotiated with the United Kingdom. A separate proposal for shared sovereignty between Britain and Spain was rejected by Gibraltarian voters in a referendum in 2002.

On 30 November 2006 the people of Gibraltar approved the proposed new constitution in a referendum, with about 60% voting in favour. The Gibraltar Constitution Order 2006 was made by Order in Council on 14 December 2006 and came into force on 2 January 2007, replacing the 1969 version. The new constitution renamed the House of Assembly as the Gibraltar Parliament and increased the number of its members to seventeen, reduced the powers of the Governor, and set out an updated framework of fundamental rights.

== Structure ==
The 2006 constitution is arranged into nine chapters, and gives effect to the separation of powers between the legislature, the executive and the judiciary. Gibraltar does not have a separate constitutional court; a legal challenge based on the constitution is ordinarily brought by way of a Notice of Constitutional Motion before the Supreme Court.

=== Chapter 1: Protection of Fundamental Rights and Freedoms ===
The first chapter, made up of sections 1 to 18, sets out a Bill of Rights guaranteeing the fundamental rights and freedoms of the individual, including the protection of the right to life and protection from the deprivation of property. Its provisions are broadly in line with the European Convention on Human Rights.

=== Chapter 2: The Governor ===
The second chapter, made up of sections 19 to 23, establishes the office of the Governor as the representative of the monarch in Gibraltar, and sets out the Governor's powers and duties.

=== Chapter 3: The Legislature ===
The third chapter, made up of sections 24 to 43, provides for the legislature, which consists of the monarch and the elected Gibraltar Parliament. It is divided into two parts: Part I (sections 24 to 31) establishes the Gibraltar Parliament and deals with its composition, membership and elections, while Part II (sections 32 to 43) governs legislation and procedure, including the making of laws and the power of the Governor to grant royal assent to bills, to withhold assent, or to reserve a bill for the signification of the monarch's pleasure.

=== Chapter 4: The Executive ===
The fourth chapter, made up of sections 44 to 53, concerns the executive, providing for a Chief Minister and a Council of Ministers appointed from among the elected members of the Parliament. The Governor generally acts on the advice of the Chief Minister, but may act contrary to, or in the absence of, that advice where he considers that the good government of Gibraltar requires it.

=== Chapter 5: The Public Service, Including Judicial and Specified Appointments ===
The fifth chapter, made up of sections 54 to 59, deals with the public service and establishes a Public Service Commission, a Specified Appointments Commission and a Judicial Service Commission, each exercising executive powers subject only to an exceptional power of veto by the Governor.

=== Chapter 6: The Judicature ===
The sixth chapter, made up of sections 60 to 66, defines the jurisdiction of the Supreme Court and the Court of Appeal, provides for the appointment and tenure of the judiciary, and guarantees the right of appeal from the Supreme Court to the Court of Appeal and, ultimately, to the Judicial Committee of the Privy Council in London.

=== Chapter 7: Finance ===
The seventh chapter, made up of sections 67 to 74, deals with public finance and establishes a Consolidated Fund for the holding of public money.

=== Chapter 8: Land ===
The eighth chapter, consisting of section 75, makes provision regarding Crown lands in Gibraltar.

=== Chapter 9: Miscellaneous ===
The ninth and final chapter, made up of sections 76 to 84, contains miscellaneous provisions, including the power of clemency vested in the Governor to grant pardons and to commute sentences, the establishment of a Gibraltar Police Authority, provision for an elected Mayor, and an interpretative section defining terms used in the constitution.

=== Schedule and annexes ===
A Schedule to the constitution sets out the oaths mandated by the text, namely the oath of allegiance, the oath for the due execution of the office of Governor, the oath for a member of the Council of Ministers, and the judicial oath. Annexes to the Order deal with transitional and other provisions, including the continuation of existing laws, offices and legal proceedings, and retain for the monarch full power to make laws for the "peace, order, and good government" of Gibraltar.

== See also ==
- Politics of Gibraltar
- 2006 Gibraltarian constitutional referendum
- Gibraltar Constitution Order 1950
- Gibraltar Constitution Order 1964
- Gibraltar Constitution Order 1969
- Gibraltar Constitution Order 2006
