= Minister of State for Courts and Legal Services =

UK government position in the Ministry of Justice

- Royal Arms of His Majesty's Government

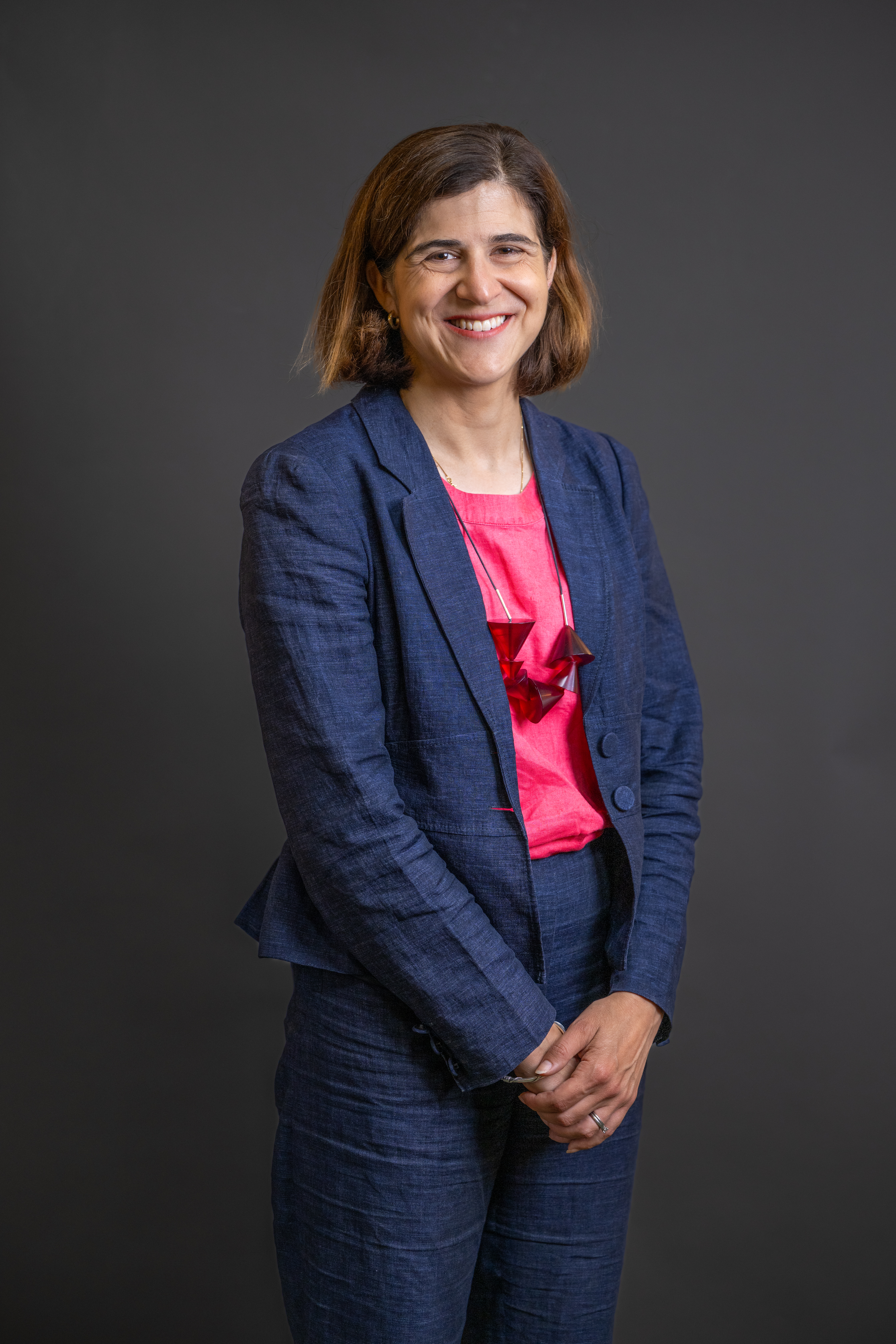
- Incumbent; Sarah Sackman since 2 December 2024
- Ministry of Justice
- Seat: Westminster, London
- Appointer: The Monarch; on the advice of the prime minister
- Term length: At His Majesty's pleasure
- Website: www.gov.uk/government/ministers/minister-of-state--180

The Minister of State for Courts and Legal Services is a ministerial office in the United Kingdom's Ministry of Justice.

== Responsibilities ==
The minister currently has responsibility of the following policy areas:

- Criminal courts policy
- Legal Aid
- Legal Aid Agency administration
- Civil Justice
- Legal Support and Dispute Resolution
- Legal Services
- His Majesty’s Courts and Tribunals *Service administration
- Magistrates Policy
- Open Justice
- Tribunals Policy (including fees)
- Irregular Migration
- Judicial Review
- MOJ Mission lead for Kickstart economic growth

== List of ministers of state ==
Name	Portrait	Took office	Left office	Political party	Ministry	Lord Chancellor
Minister of State for Criminal Justice and Courts
Harriet Harman; MP for Camberwell and Peckham		10 May 2005	8 May 2007	Labour	Blair III	Lord Falconer of Thoroton
Minister of State for Justice
Michael Wills; MP for North Swindon		2 July 2007	6 May 2010	Labour	Brown	Jack Straw
Parliamentary Under-Secretary of State for Courts and Legal Aid
Jonathan Djanogly; MP for Huntingdon		11 May 2010	4 September 2012	Conservative	Cameron–Clegg	Kenneth Clarke
Parliamentary Under-Secretary of State for Courts and Victims
Helen Grant; MP for Maidstone and The Weald		4 September 2012	7 October 2013	Conservative	Cameron–Clegg	Chris Grayling
Parliamentary Under-Secretary of State for Courts and Legal Aid
Shailesh Vara; MP for North West Cambridgeshire		7 October 2013	17 July 2016	Conservative	Cameron–Clegg; Cameron II	Chris Grayling; Michael Gove
Parliamentary Under-Secretary of State for Civil Liberties and Human Rights
Dominic Raab; MP for Esher and Walton		12 May 2015	16 July 2016	Conservative	Cameron II	Michael Gove
Minister of State for Courts and Justice
Oliver Heald; MP for North East Hertfordshire		16 July 2016	12 June 2017	Conservative	May I	Liz Truss
Dominic Raab; MP for Esher and Walton		12 June 2017	9 January 2018	Conservative	May II	David Lidington
Parliamentary Under-Secretary of State for Court Services and Legal aid
Lucy Frazer; MP for South East Cambridgeshire		9 January 2018	9 May 2019	Conservative	May II	David Gauke
Paul Maynard; MP for Blackpool North and Cleveleys		9 May 2019	26 July 2019	Conservative	May II	David Gauke
Parliamentary Under-Secretary of State for Family law and Justice
Wendy Morton; MP for Aldridge-Brownhills		26 July 2019	13 February 2020	Conservative	Johnson I Johnson II	Robert Buckland
Parliamentary Under-Secretary of State for Criminal law and Justice
Alex Chalk; MP for Cheltenham		14 February 2020	16 September 2021	Conservative	Johnson II	Robert Buckland
Parliamentary Under-Secretary of State for Criminal law and Court Recovery
James Cartlidge; MP for South Suffolk		17 September 2021	7 July 2022	Conservative	Johnson II	Dominic Raab
Parliamentary Under-Secretary of State for Justice and the Home Office
Sarah Dines; MP for Derbyshire Dales		8 July 2022	20 September 2022	Conservative	Johnson II	Dominic Raab
Sarah Dines; MP for Derbyshire Dales		8 July 2022	20 September 2022	Conservative	Truss	Brandon Lewis
Parliamentary Under-Secretary of State for Courts
Gareth Johnson; MP for Dartford		20 September 2022	27 October 2022	Conservative	Truss	Brandon Lewis
Parliamentary Under-Secretary of State for Constitution and Legal Services (September–October 2022) Parliamentary Under-Secretary of State for Courts and Legal Cervices (from November 2022)
Mike Freer; MP for Finchley and Golders Green		20 September 2022	5 July 2024	Conservative	Truss	Brandon Lewis
Mike Freer; MP for Finchley and Golders Green		20 September 2022	5 July 2024	Conservative	Sunak	Dominic Raab
Mike Freer; MP for Finchley and Golders Green		20 September 2022	5 July 2024	Conservative	Sunak	Alex Chalk
Minister of State for Courts and Legal Services						
Heidi Alexander; MP for Swindon South		5 July 2024	2 December 2024	Labour	Starmer	Shabana Mahmood
Sarah Sackman; MP for Finchley and Golders Green		2 December 2024	Incumbent	Labour	Starmer	Shabana Mahmood
Sarah Sackman; MP for Finchley and Golders Green		2 December 2024	Incumbent	Labour	Starmer	David Lammy
Sarah Sackman; MP for Finchley and Golders Green		2 December 2024	Incumbent	Labour	Burnham	Alex Norris

== See also ==
- Ministry of Justice (United Kingdom)
- His Majesty's Courts and Tribunals Service
