= Gibraltar Police Authority =

The Gibraltar Police Authority is an independent body that is responsible for securing that the Royal Gibraltar Police operates efficiently and effectively. It was created under Section 48 of the Gibraltar Constitution Order 2006. It is a corporate body whose responsibilities and powers are set out in the Police Act 2006 (amended in 2010).
