= Abraham Serfaty (Gibraltarian) =

Gibraltarian architect and politician

His Worship Abraham William Serfaty CBE, JP
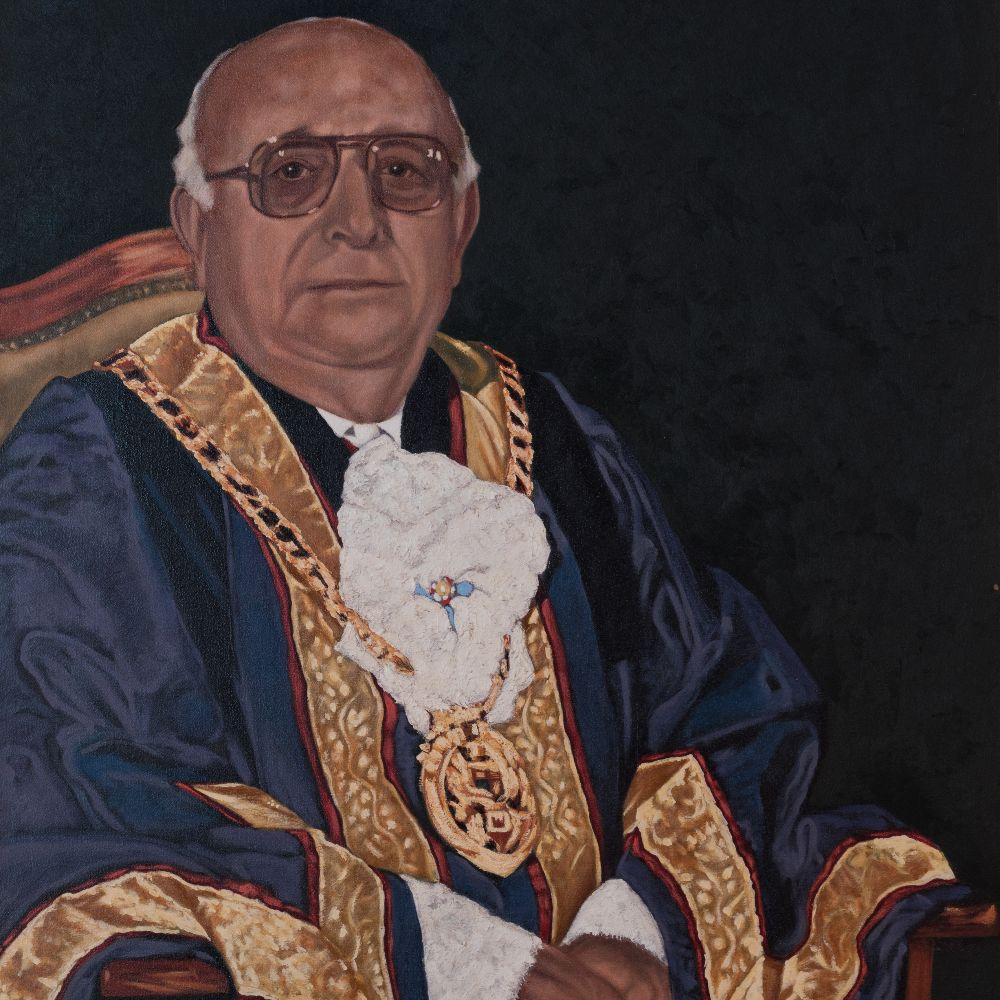

Mayor of Gibraltar
- In office 1979–1988

Personal details
- Born: Gibraltar
- Party: Association for the Advancement of Civil Rights (AACR)
- Occupation: Architect; Politician

Abraham William Serfaty CBE, JP, was a Gibraltarian architect and politician.

== Biography ==
Born in 1910, Abraham William Serfaty was a draughtsman of the Gibraltar City Council when he received an invitation to work for Messrs Pearson Mechanical and Civil Engineers in the UK. While in England, he completed his studies in civil engineering.

Returning to the Rock, Serfaty worked as an architect and later joined the AACR of Sir Joshua Hassan. He ran for the Legislative Council in 1950 but was not elected. However, he became part of the Executive Council, initially as an "unofficial member". In the Legislative Council elections of 1956, he was one of four AACR members elected, the others being Joshua Hassan, Albert Risso, and J. E. Alcantara.

He served at first as Member or Minister for Medical Services, then as Minister for Tourism, and finally as Minister for Economic Development in successive AACR Governments until his retirement in 1984.

Between 1979 and 1988 he served as Mayor of Gibraltar.

In 1980, he became Commander of the Order of the British Empire in recognition for public services in Gibraltar.
