= Dorothy Ellicott =

Gibraltarian historian and politician (1901–1990)

Dorothy May Ellicott OBE GMH JP
- Photo of Dorothy Ellicott from Our Gibraltar: A Short History of The Rock
- Born: Dorothy May Bridger; 1901; Havant, United Kingdom of Great Britain and Ireland
- Died: 1990 (aged 88–89); Gibraltar
- Education: Loreto Convent
- Occupations: Nurse; Politician; Historian; Chair of the Gibraltar Museum
- Known for: Public service and service to Gibraltar's heritage
- Notable work: Our Gibraltar: A Short History of The Rock
- Term: December 1947 – December 1956 (Gibraltar City Council); September 1959 – September 1964 (Gibraltar Legislative Council)
- Political party: Association for the Advancement of Civil Rights (AACR), independent
- Board member of: Gibraltar Museum; Gibraltar Society for the Prevention of Blindness; Gibraltar Society for the Prevention of Cruelty to Animals
- Spouse: John (Jack) Teague Ellicott

Dorothy May Ellicott, OBE, GMH, JP (1901–1990), was a Gibraltarian historian and politician. She was the first woman to become a member of the City Council in 1947 and served there for nine years. In 1959, she became the first woman to be elected to Gibraltar's Legislative Council.

== Early life ==
Dorothy Ellicott was born in Havant, Hampshire, England in the last quarter of 1901. She was raised in Gibraltar having relocated there with her parents at the age of 5 when her father was transferred to work at the Gibraltar Dockyard. There, she received her education from the Sisters of Loreto, either at the day school at Gavino's Passage or at the Loreto Convent on Europa Road, even though Ellicott's family were Anglicans at a time when there was a "fashionable Protestant school, Miss Hepper's".

As a young woman she worked as Secretary to the Editor of the Gibraltar Chronicle, a connection she maintained over the years contributing numerous articles. She was also a Reuters correspondent. In 1926 she married John (Jack) Teague Ellicott. At the start of World War II, she was a member of the St. John Ambulance Nurses and took part in some of the first journeys to French Morocco, in the initial stages of the evacuation of the Gibraltar civilian population (May/June 1940), later returning to "the Rock". When the Gibraltarian evacuees were later expelled from the French Morocco and a wider scale evacuation schema was being implemented, Ellicott had to leave Gibraltar by September 1940 and relocated to the United Kingdom, where she remained for four years. She did not return to Gibraltar until August 1944.

== Political career ==
After the war she became involved in politics, initially as a member of the Association for the Advancement of Civil Rights (AACR) (Joshua Hassan's party, of which her husband was also a member; he was elected to the City Council in the first elections after the war, in 1945). In 1947 she was awarded the MBE. She was the first woman to become a member of the City Council, in December 1947, within the candidature of the AACR (this being the first election in which women were allowed to stand and vote), and remained so as an elected member for nine years. In the early 1950s, Ellicott left the AACR. In 1959, she also became the first woman to be elected to the Legislative Council, this time as an independent, remaining there for five years. She was also Chair of the Gibraltar Museum Committee.

After giving up her political roles, she became increasingly active in charitable and cultural activities. She was the Honorary Secretary of the Gibraltar Society for the Prevention of Blindness for twenty years and Chair of the Gibraltar branch of the Royal Society for the Prevention of Cruelty to Animals for fifteen.

In 1970, Dorothy Ellicott was appointed first female Justice of Peace of Gibraltar. In 1972, she was awarded the OBE. In 2008, the recently created Gibraltar Medallion of Honour was bestowed, posthumously, upon Dorothy Ellicott for public service and service to heritage.

As a historian, she wrote several articles, booklets and books. Her most renowned work was Our Gibraltar, published in 1974 by the Gibraltar Museum. It was described by Sir Varyl Begg (Governor of Gibraltar from 1969 to 1973), as a work that told "the story of The Rock in a manner suitable for the visitor seeking a brief outline of historical events in easily digestible form". It is also mentioned by Sir William Jackson (historian and Governor of Gibraltar from 1978 to 1982), in the preface of his work The Rock of the Gibraltarians (1990).

== Works ==
- An Ornament to the Almeida, being the Story of Gibraltar's City Hall. 1950. (with her husband, J.T. Elliott)
- Gibraltar's Royal Governor. Gibraltar. 1954.
- From Rooke to Nelson: 101 Eventful Years in Gibraltar. Gibraltar: Garrison Library. 1965.
- Bastion Against Aggression, How Gibraltar Helped Spain during the Peninsular War. Gibraltar: Gibraltar Society. 1969.
- Our Gibraltar: A Short History of the Rock. Gibraltar: Gibraltar Museum Committee. 1975.
- The Cathedral of The Holy Trinity, Gibraltar (Revised ed.). Gibraltar: Holy Trinity Cathedral Council. 1999.

== Bibliography ==
- Ellicott, Dorothy (1975). Our Gibraltar. Gibraltar Museum Committee.
