= Gibraltar Constitution Order 2006 =

2006 constitution of Gibraltar

Privy Council
- Royal assent: 14 December 2006
- Commenced: 2 January 2007

Repeals
- Gibraltar Constitution Order 1969
- Status: Current legislation

Gibraltar Constitution Order 2006
- 30 November 2006
- "In exercise of your right to self-determination, do you approve and accept the proposed new Constitution for Gibraltar?"

Results
Choice	Votes	%
Yes	7,299	60.42%
No	4,574	37.86%
Blank votes	208	1.72%
Valid votes	12,081	99.70%
Invalid votes	36	0.30%
Total votes	12,117	100.00%
Registered voters/turnout	20,061	60.4%

The Gibraltar Constitution Order 2006 was taken to a referendum in Gibraltar on 30 November 2006. A coalition of groups opposing the proposal held that a majority of 60% should be required to give effect to a new Constitution, quoting other instances, but the political parties held that the result should be decided by a simple majority in favour of the new constitution. The constitution was approved by 60% of the votes anyway.

It was given effect by an Order in Council on 14 December 2006 and it came into force on 2 January 2007. According to the British government, it aimed to provide a modern and mature relationship that is not based on colonialism between Gibraltar and the United Kingdom.

== Origin ==
In 1999, the Government of the United Kingdom invited British Dependent Territories to provide proposals for constitutional reform. A cross-party committee of the Gibraltar House of Assembly was set up to consult with interested parties and in January 2002 produced a report, which was subsequently debated and negotiated with the United Kingdom. The proposals for the reform were accepted by the British Foreign and Commonwealth Office in March 2006 and then were unanimously approved in the House of Assembly in October.

== Publication procedure ==
Once promulgated by the Queen-in-Council, the Constitution Order was published as a set of documents:

1. The Despatch, the letter under cover of which the Foreign Secretary sent the Constitution order to the Governor of Gibraltar.
2. The Order in Council, which contained the preamble as main content. It also included several annexes.
3. The Annexes to the Order in Council. Annex No 1 is the text of the Constitution itself; Annex No 2 contains the transitional and other provisions.

== Contents ==
The proposed constitution had been negotiated with the British Government by a delegation representing Gibraltar, comprising the Government, the Opposition and others. The text of the proposed new Constitution had been welcomed by the House of Assembly in a motion passed unanimously with the support of both sides of the House.

Among changes introduced by the new constitution were:

- Renaming the House of Assembly to the Gibraltar Parliament.
- Renaming "Members of the House of Assembly" to "Members of Parliament" (MPs).
- Removal of the two remaining un-elected members of the House of Assembly.
- Increasing the number of elected representatives from 15 to 17, with the parliament able to legislate to increase this number.
- Decreasing the Governor's powers, and transferring some of these to elected officials.
- Modernization of the relationship between Gibraltar and the UK, without affecting the issue of sovereignty.
- A bill of "fundamental rights and freedoms" enshrined in the constitution.

== Referendum ==
A referendum on the proposed new constitution order was held on 30 November 2006. The motion proposed and approved was:

In exercise of your right to self-determination, do you approve and accept the proposed new Constitution for Gibraltar?

The possible answers were "Yes" and "No".

=== Result ===
Turnout was 60.4%, the lowest at a general election or referendum for 25 years. This was much lower than the 87.9% achieved for the 2002 referendum on shared sovereignty but comparable to the 58% for the election for the European Parliament. 60.24% of votes cast were for the order, 37.75% of votes were against.

Gibraltar constitutional referendum, 2006
Choice	Votes	%
For	7,299	61.48
Against	4,574	38.52
Total	11,873	100.00
Valid votes	11,873	97.99
Invalid/blank votes	244	2.01
Total votes	12,117	100.00
Registered voters/turnout	20,061	60.40

== Response ==
=== On colonialism and modernisation of political institutions ===
Answering the complaints of Spanish Foreign Minister Miguel Ángel Moratinos, Jack Straw stated:

My own view [is] that the label "colonial" is misleading and anachronistic in this context; regardless of the United Nations dimension. As Peter Caruana and I said in our joint statement on Monday, the new Constitution provides for "a modern and mature" relationship between the UK and Gibraltar. I do not think that this description would apply to any relationship based on colonialism.

In the foreword of an explanatory leaflet issued by the Government of Gibraltar for the proposed new constitution, Chief Minister Peter Caruana said that he:

wholeheartedly commends [this new Constitution, which is] the culmination of many years of political effort by the Gibraltar Government, other elected members of the House representing the Opposition, and others.

He further added:

this new Constitution modernises the quality of democracy in Gibraltar (and the democratic rights of the people of Gibraltar), bringing them much closer to normal European standards, by upgrading and modernising the status, role and functions of the democratic institutions of the people of Gibraltar.

Caruana also stated:

Gibraltar has always been politically most secure when we have advanced constitutionally. This is because constitutional stagnation suggests that we are stuck in the past until we agree to things that we do not want. That is not good for Gibraltar. This Referendum is thus important for Gibraltar. The opportunity that it presents to us is unlikely to come again for a long time, if at all. Please therefore vote.

=== On independence ===
At the same time, the UK government, while fully supporting the right of self-determination for Gibraltarians, excluded the possibility of independence for Gibraltar, referring to the Treaty of Utrecht:

As a separate territory, recognised by the United Nations and included since 1946 in its list of non-self-governing territories, Gibraltar enjoys the individual and collective rights accorded by the Charter of the United Nations. Her Majesty's Government therefore supports the right of self-determination of the people of Gibraltar, promoted in accordance with the other principles and rights of the Charter of the United Nations, except in so far only as in the view of Her Majesty's Government, which it has expressed in Parliament and otherwise publicly on many occasions, Article X of the Treaty of Utrecht gives Spain the right of refusal should Britain ever renounce sovereignty. Thus, it is the position of Her Majesty's Government that there is no constraint to that right, except that independence would be only an option for Gibraltar with Spain's consent.

However, the UK government acknowledged that Gibraltar "does not share the view that this constraint exists and that their acceptance of this Constitution is on that basis".

== Criticisms ==
In spite of the unanimous support from all the political parties represented in the House of Assembly, there was a significant "No" movement. The reasons were diverse, but mainly related to two aspects: while some electors could have felt that the commitment to retaining British sovereignty was not sufficiently secure, other could have believed that the new constitution were not advanced enough in allowing the exercise of the right to self-determination. The minority rights pressure group Equality Rights GGR, have called it "gravely deficient" and a "missed opportunity", for failing to fully incorporate the European Convention on Human Rights.

The Self Determination for Gibraltar Group also criticised the constitution and campaigned for a No vote in the constitutional referendum. They said in a press release that the new constitution "is not the act of self-determination which will decolonise us" and that it "is as colonial as its 1964 and 1969 predecessors."

Joe Bossano, Leader of the Opposition, criticised the failure to phrase the preamble in a way that supported the maximum possible level of self-government.

== See also ==
- Constitution of Gibraltar
- Gibraltar Constitution Order 1950
- Gibraltar Constitution Order 1964
- Gibraltar Constitution Order 1969
- Politics of Gibraltar
