= Gibraltar Constitution Order 1969 =

1969 constitution of Gibraltar

Queen-in-Council
- Long title: An Order providing a new constitution for Gibraltar
- Territorial extent: Gibraltar
- Enacted by: Queen Elizabeth II in Council
- Commenced: 30 May 1969

Repealed by
- Gibraltar Constitution Order 2006
- Status: Repealed

The Gibraltar Constitution Order 1969 was an Order in Council that provided a new constitution for the British colony of Gibraltar. It was published on 30 May 1969 and came into immediate effect, replacing the Gibraltar Constitution Order 1964. Its preamble contained an assurance that Gibraltar would remain part of the Crown's dominions unless and until an Act of Parliament provided otherwise, and that the United Kingdom would never place the people of Gibraltar under the sovereignty of another state against their freely and democratically expressed wishes.

The constitution was the outcome of the constitutional conference chaired by the 2nd Baron Shepherd held from 16 to 24 July 1968. Since it reinforced Gibraltar's link with Britain, its promulgation prompted Spain to close the land frontier with Gibraltar, a closure that lasted thirteen years. The Order was superseded in 2007 by the Gibraltar Constitution Order 2006.

== Background ==
The move towards the 1969 constitution was set in train by the 1967 sovereignty referendum, in which 99.19% of Gibraltarians voted against passing under Spanish sovereignty and in favour of retaining their link with Britain, with democratic local institutions and with Britain retaining its existing responsibilities.

At the request of the United Nations, Spain and the United Kingdom had been holding inconclusive talks about Gibraltar for the previous three years. Since 1954 the Government of Spain under Francisco Franco had applied increasingly restrictive measures in its dealings with Gibraltar. On 24 July 1968 Spain complained to the UN Secretary-General that the constitutional talks were a further obstacle to a solution of Gibraltar's future, a claim rejected by the Government of the United Kingdom.

== Constitutional conference ==
The constitution was drawn up at a constitutional conference chaired by the 2nd Baron Shepherd, which sat from 16 to 24 July 1968. The Gibraltarian members of the conference were Joshua Hassan, Aurelio Montegriffo and Abraham Serfaty for the Association for the Advancement of Civil Rights; Robert Peliza, Maurice Xiberras and the legal adviser Sir Frederick Bennet for the Integration With Britain Party; and Peter Isola.

== Preamble ==
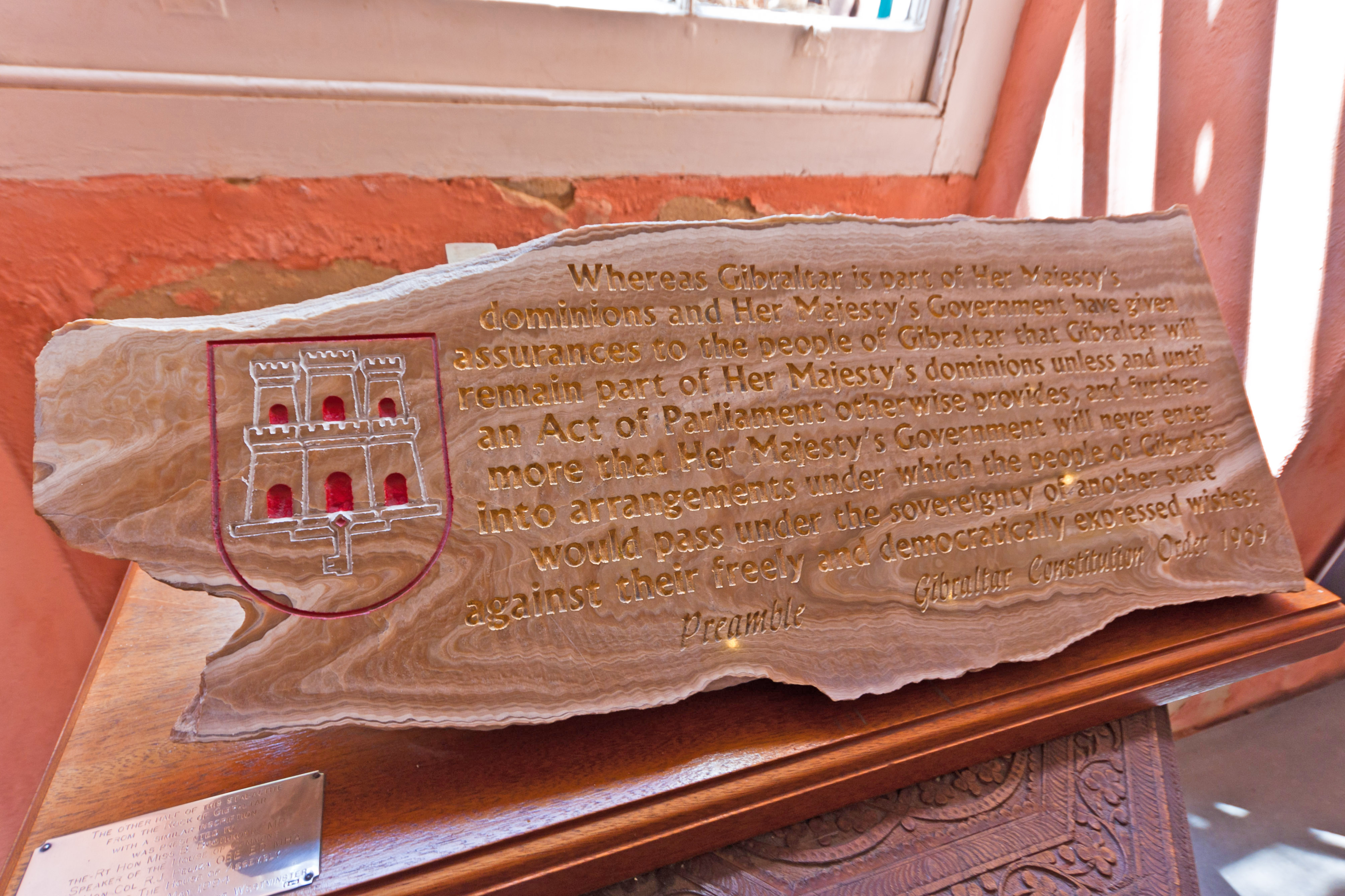
The preamble to the 1969 constitution engraved onto a stalactite at the Gibraltar Museum.

The most significant feature of the 1969 constitution for the Gibraltarians was the preamble to the Order in Council promulgating it, which in its final form began:

Whereas Gibraltar is part of Her Majesty's dominions and Her Majesty's Government have given assurances to the people of Gibraltar that Gibraltar will remain part of Her Majesty's dominions unless and until an Act of Parliament otherwise provides, and furthermore that Her Majesty's Government will never enter into arrangements under which the people of Gibraltar would pass under the sovereignty of another state against their freely and democratically expressed wishes.

This preamble has been described as the single most significant statement made on the sovereignty of Gibraltar since the signing of the Treaty of Utrecht.

== Frontier closure ==
On 20 May 1968 the Gibraltar–Spain border was closed by the Spanish Guardia Civil, and disorder ensued as controls were imposed on travellers attempting to use the ferry service at the port of Algeciras. This situation, which lasted into September 1968, was a precursor to the full frontier closure of the following year.

The constitution was published on 30 May 1969 and came into immediate effect, with elections scheduled for 30 July. The Spanish government characterised the promulgation as an open disregard of the UN resolutions by the UK government and a violation of the Treaty of Utrecht. On 6 July 1969 the decision was taken to close the land border between Spain and Gibraltar, and it was implemented the following day.

The closure of the border, together with various other restrictions, was a severe shock for the Gibraltarians, who became aware that across the frontier lay a hostile and threatening foreign power. The closure lasted thirteen years and was regarded by the Gibraltarians as the last in a series of sieges by which Spain sought to secure the surrender of the city.

== Legacy ==
The 1969 constitution remained in force for more than three decades. It was superseded by the Gibraltar Constitution Order 2006, which was approved by referendum on 30 November 2006, given effect by an Order in Council on 14 December 2006 and brought into force on 2 January 2007.

== See also ==
- Constitution of Gibraltar
- Gibraltar Constitution Order 1950
- Gibraltar Constitution Order 1964
- Gibraltar Constitution Order 2006
- 1967 Gibraltar sovereignty referendum
- History of Gibraltar
- Politics of Gibraltar
