= Albert Risso =

Gibraltarian politician (died before 2008)

Albert Risso GMH
- Born: Gibraltar
- Died: Gibraltar
- Resting place: Gibraltar
- Citizenship: British
- Occupations: Mechanic; Trade unionist Politician
- Known for: First president of the AACR and the GCL
- Political party: Association for the Advancement of Civil Rights
- Awards: Gibraltar Medallion of Honour (2008)

Albert J. Risso (died before 2008), GMH was a Gibraltarian trade unionist and politician. He was the first president of the Association for the Advancement of Civil Rights (AACR) in Gibraltar.

== Career ==
Albert Risso was one of the first political activists in the British territory of Gibraltar. at a very young age, he was one of the campaigners for the involvement of the Gibraltarian civilian population (and especially its working class) in governing the colony. In 1919, he was one of the members of a so-called "deputation of working men" who went to London to meet the Secretary of State for the Colonies and ask for the creation of a representative body that could succeed the Sanitary Commission, an unelected body whose members, usually belonging to the upper class, were nominated by the Governor. The campaign, driven by the trade unions, brought about the creation of the Gibraltar City Council in 1921.

By the start of World War II, Risso was a foreman mechanic and a City Council employee. When most of Gibraltar's civilian population was evacuated, Risso was one of the few Gibraltarians that remained on The Rock. In September 1942, a group of fellow Gibraltarians, clerks and workers, led by Risso came together to form the AACR, an association advocating the Gibraltarians' civil rights. Risso was president of the AACR from 1942 to 1948, when he was succeeded by former vice president, Joshua Hassan. In 1947, he was appointed president of the Gibraltar Confederation of Labour, a trade union created to represent the AACR's rank and file working class supporters.

Risso was continuously reelected member of the Gibraltar Legislative Council during the 1950s and early 1960s, as candidate of the AACR. He was elected in 1950, 1953, 1956, 1959 and 1964. Risso stood for election for all AACR candidatures to the City Council and to the Legislative Council first, and the House of Assembly until the 1970s. He was also a member of the Constitutional Conference which drafted the Gibraltar's first constitution.

== Honours ==
In the 1980s, Risso was offered a decoration. However, he refused on the grounds of his egalitarian ideals.

In 2004, Risso was posthumously granted the Gibraltar Award by the Self Determination for Gibraltar Group for his contribution to Gibraltar as a civil rights activist and politician.

On 22 February 2005 the Government of Gibraltar announced that a proposed senior citizens building at Waterport in Gibraltar was to be named Albert Risso House following his enormous contribution to public life.

Upon the creation of the Gibraltar Medallion of Honour in 2008, Albert Risso was posthumously awarded the Medallion and therefore was recorded in the Gibraltar Roll of Honour.
