= Elections in Gibraltar =

Under the Gibraltar Constitution Order 2006 and the Parliament Act 1950, Gibraltar elects the 17 Members of Parliament (MPs) who make up its legislature, the Gibraltar Parliament. Members serve a four-year term and are elected from a single constituency under the limited voting system, in which each voter may cast up to ten votes. Since electors can vote for at most ten candidates, parties usually stand only ten candidates rather than a full slate of 17, aiming to have all of them elected.

== History ==
For much of the colonial period the inhabitants of Gibraltar had no vote, a position successive administrations justified by reference to the territory's status as a military fortress. Civilian involvement in local affairs was at first confined to appointed or nominated bodies, beginning with the district health committees formed during the yellow fever epidemic of 1804 and continuing with the Board of Health (1810), the Commissioners for Paving and Scavenging (1815) and the Sanitary Commissioners (1865).

The first elections in Gibraltar were held in 1921, following the City Council Ordinance of that year, which replaced the Sanitary Commissioners with a City Council of nine members, four of them elected and five appointed by the Governor. The franchise was limited to ratepayers, so that only around 4,265 people were entitled to vote out of a population of roughly 18,500.

After the Second World War the City Council was reconstituted with an elected majority, seven of its thirteen members being elected, and the vote was extended to all male British subjects aged 21 or over who had been resident in Gibraltar for at least twelve months.

A Legislative Council was established under an Order in Council that took effect on 3 February 1950, with five elected members. The first elections to it were held in November 1950; this was the first Gibraltar election in which women could vote — a right granted in 1947 — and voting was by the single transferable vote. The number of elected members was raised from five to seven in 1956, giving the Legislative Council an elected majority for the first time. Following a constitutional conference in 1964, the elected membership was increased to eleven, nominated members were abolished, and the office of Chief Minister and a Council of Ministers with collective responsibility were introduced.

The 1969 Constitution replaced the Legislative Council and the City Council with the House of Assembly, comprising a Speaker, fifteen elected members and two ex-officio members. The 1969 general election was the first held by direct voting rather than proportional representation, and an ordinance passed in October 1969 lowered the voting age from 21 to 18.

== Eligibility to vote ==
People must be qualified to vote and listed on the Register of Electors in order to cast a ballot.

British nationals (this includes all forms of British nationality) who have lived in Gibraltar for a continuous period of six months and who intend to live in Gibraltar either permanently or indefinitely are entitled to register to vote in general elections to the Gibraltar Parliament if they will be aged 18 or over on polling day.

Gibraltar, along with the UK, joined the EEC (the predecessor of the European Union) in 1973, and from 2004 eligible voters in Gibraltar were able to vote in elections to the European Parliament. British, European Union and qualifying Commonwealth citizens (those who had a permit or certificate to enter/remain in Gibraltar, or who did not require such a permit/certificate on the date of their electoral registration application) living in Gibraltar were entitled to register to vote in European Parliament elections if they were aged 18 or over on polling day.

In addition, British nationals and Commonwealth citizens living outside Gibraltar could register as 'overseas electors' and vote in elections to the European Parliament provided that they were on the Register of Electors in Gibraltar within the past 15 years (the 15 years period begins when they no longer appeared in the Register of Electors, not the date they moved abroad). For British nationals and Commonwealth citizens who moved abroad before they were 18 years old, they could still qualify for registration as an 'overseas elector' in elections to the European Parliament, with the 15 years period calculated from the date their parent(s)/guardian ceased to appear in the Register of Electors in Gibraltar.

Following Gibraltar's withdrawal from the European Union as a result of Brexit, this was revoked on 31 December 2020.

== Legislative Council elections (1950–1964) ==
The Legislative Council was Gibraltar's legislature from 1950 until it was replaced by the House of Assembly under the 1969 Constitution. Five general elections were held to it, all conducted using the single transferable vote, a form of proportional representation; direct voting was not introduced until the 1969 election to the House of Assembly. The number of elected members rose from five in 1950 and 1953 to seven in 1956 and 1959, and to eleven in 1964; the 1964 reforms also abolished nominated members and introduced the office of Chief Minister. Figures below are each grouping's share of first-preference votes, with the number of seats won shown beneath; because the number of seats contested changed over time, the seat totals per election are five (1950, 1953), seven (1956, 1959) and eleven (1964).

Summary of Legislative Council general elections, 1950–1964
Election	AACR	Commonwealth	TGWU	Ind.	Turnout	±	Senior office-holder after election (Note: The President of the Legislative Council presided ex officio as Governor; the office of Speaker was introduced in 1958 and that of Chief Minister in 1964.)
1950 (Note: The first election in which women could vote. The poll was topped by the independent A. R. Isola.)	46.10 3		7.66 0	46.24 2	53.2	—	Kenneth Anderson (President)
1953 (Note: First-preference vote totals for the 1953 election are not available; only the distribution of seats is shown. J. A. Hassan (AACR) topped the poll.)	– 3			– 2	55.7 (Note: Turnout for 1953 is derived from the 7,276 votes cast out of 13,071 registered electors.)	▲2.5	Gordon MacMillan (President)
1956 (Note: The number of elected seats was raised from five to seven, giving the Council an elected majority for the first time.)	48.11 4	18.58 1		33.31 2	58.2	▲2.5	Harold Redman (President)
1959 (Note: Dorothy Ellicott became the first woman elected to the Council; J. A. Hassan was appointed Chief Member.)	41.95 3		11.50 1	46.55 3	66.3 (Note: Finlayson reports the poll as 66.3%, though the 8,541 votes cast against the electorate of 13,331 he gives would imply about 64%.)	▲8.1	Joseph Patron (Speaker)
1964 (Note: The number of elected seats was increased from seven to eleven and nominated members were abolished. First-preference vote totals are not available. The AACR won five of the eleven seats and formed a government with the independent Sir Peter Russo, and J. A. Hassan became the first Chief Minister.)	– 5			– 6	76.2	▲9.9	Joshua Hassan (Chief Minister)
Sources: first-preference votes and seats from Garcia (drawing on the Gibraltar Chronicle, 9 November 1950) and the Gibraltar Parliament; turnout from Finlayson. The 1964 seat figures are from McHale.

== General elections since 1969 ==
Below are results from elections to the Gibraltar Parliament and its predecessor, the House of Assembly (established by the Gibraltar Constitution Order 1969). Elections are held roughly every four years for 17 members, a figure raised from 15 by the Gibraltar Constitution Order 2006. Under the limited voting system in section 22 of the Parliament Act 1950, each elector has one vote per seat contested, capped at ten. This ceiling was raised from eight by the Parliament (Amendment) Act 2007.

Summary of Gibraltarian general elections for the House of Assembly / Gibraltar Parliament, 1969–2023
Election	GSLP	LPG	TG	GDM	AACR	IWBP	Isola	GSD	DPBG	O/I	Turnout	±
1969 (Note: Elections were held under limited voting, with each voter allowed up to eight votes; percentages are each party's share of all votes cast. The AACR won the most seats (7 of 15), but the IWBP and the Isola Group together held eight seats and formed a coalition government, with Robert Peliza (IWBP) as Chief Minister.)					40.1 7	29.2 5	17.1 3			13.6 0	71.4 (Note: No official turnout figure was published for this election; the figure shown, 71.4% (10,318 of 14,445 registered electors), is drawn from contemporary press reports.)	—
1972 (Note: The Isola Group did not contest the 1972 election; its members had joined the IWBP.)					51.6 8	42.5 7				5.9 0	— (Note: No official turnout figure is published for this election.)	—
1976 (Note: The IWBP had dissolved before the 1976 election; its former leading figures Maurice Xiberras, Peter Isola and Robert Peliza were elected as independents.)				28.6 4	48.5 8					23.0 3	74.8 (Note: The 2023 official results do not give a turnout figure for 1976; the figure of 74.8% is reported by Finlayson.)	— (Note: No change shown as no turnout figure is available for the preceding election.)
1980 (Note: Others in 1980 comprised the Party for the Autonomy of Gibraltar (4.7%, no seats).)	23.7 1				38.6 8				33.0 6	4.7 0	65.7	▼9.1 (Note: Change calculated against the 1976 figure reported by Finlayson, which is not part of the official results series used for the other elections.)
1984	34.2 7				44.4 8				18.9 0	2.6 0	74.0 (Note: Turnout reported as approximately 74%.)	▲8.3
1988 (Note: Others in 1988 comprised the Independent Democrats (12.4%, no seats).)	58.2 8				29.3 7					12.4 0	76.9	▲2.9
1992 (Note: The LPG contested the 1992 and 1996 elections as the Gibraltar National Party (GNP).) (Note: The AACR contested the 1992 election as "Independent AACR" candidates.)	73.1 8	4.7 0			2.0 0			20.2 7			71.7	▼5.2
1996	43.0 7	4.7 0						52.2 8		0.2 0	87.7	▲16.0
2000 (Note: From 2000 onwards the GSLP and LPG contested elections jointly as the GSLP–Liberal Alliance; percentages shown are each party's share of the vote.)	25.6 5	15.0 2						58.3 8		1.1 0	83.6	▼4.1
2003 (Note: Others in 2003 comprised the Gibraltar Labour Party (8.3%) and the Reform Party (0.5%), neither winning seats.)	25.1 5	14.6 2						51.5 8		8.9 0	79.2	▼4.4
2007 (Note: Under the 2006 Constitution, the House of Assembly became the Gibraltar Parliament, with all 17 members directly elected from 2007 onwards.) (Note: Others in 2007 comprised the Progressive Democratic Party (3.7%), New Gibraltar Democracy (0.8%) and independents (0.6%), none winning seats.)	31.8 4	13.6 3						49.3 10		5.2 0	81.4	▲2.2
2011 (Note: Others in 2011 comprised the Progressive Democratic Party (4.4%, no seats).)	34.2 7	14.6 3						46.8 7		4.4 0	82.5	▲1.1
2015	47.8 7	20.6 3						31.6 7			70.8	▼11.7
2019	37.0 7	15.5 3	20.5 1					25.6 6		1.5 0	70.8	▼0.1 (Note: Turnout fell from 70.85% in 2015 to 70.84% in 2019; the change rounds to −0.1 at one decimal place on the unrounded figures.)
2023 (Note: Others in 2023 comprised independent candidate Robert Vasquez (1.8%, no seat).)	35.4 7	14.6 2						48.1 8		1.8 0	76.4	▲5.6
Source: Gibraltar Parliament

== UK elections ==
Unlike the other British Overseas Territories, Gibraltar took part as a UK counting area in three European elections and one UK-wide referendum as part of the South West England electoral region.

- 2004 European Parliament election in Gibraltar
- 2009 European Parliament election in Gibraltar
- 2014 European Parliament election in Gibraltar
- European Union Referendum 2016 (Gibraltar)
- 2019 European Parliament election in Gibraltar

Some people have advocated, including individual MPs, UKIP, the Liberal Democrats and the Gibraltar in Westminster Movement that Gibraltar should be extended the franchise of voting in UK general elections as a Westminster constituency.

== See also ==
- Effect of Brexit on Gibraltar
- Electoral calendar
- Electoral system
