= 1996 Gibraltar general election =

- 16 May 1996

15 of the 17 seats in the House of Assembly 8 seats needed for a majority
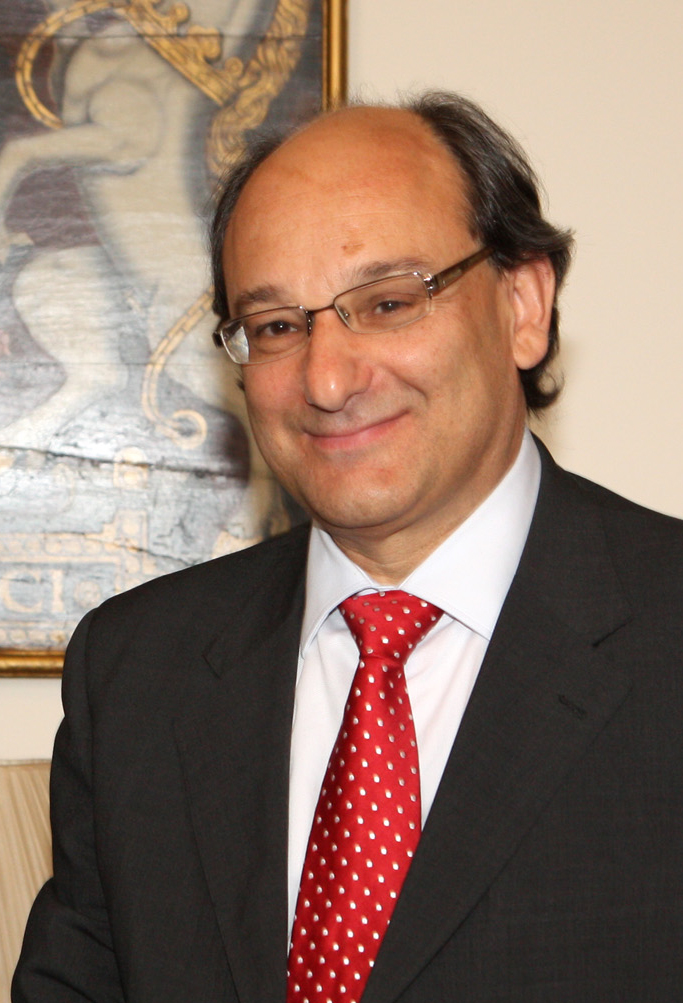

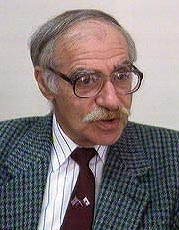
	Majority party	Minority party
Leader	Peter Caruana	Joe Bossano
Party	Social Democrats	Socialist Labour
Seats won	8	7
Popular vote	66,190	54,463
Percentage	52.20%	42.95%
Chief Minister before election
Joe Bossano
Socialist Labour
Elected Chief Minister
Peter Caruana
Social Democrats

General elections were held in Gibraltar in May 1996. They were won by Peter Caruana's Gibraltar Social Democrats (GSD), who took over 50% of the popular vote and eight of the 15 contested seats, defeating incumbent Joe Bossano's Gibraltar Socialist Labour Party.

== Party slogans and election logos ==
Party or alliance	Slogan
GSD	"A Vision For Our Future And For Our Children"
GSLP	"Into The 21st Century With The GSLP"
GNP	"The Party you can Trust!"

== Results ==
Party	Votes	%	Seats	+/–
Gibraltar Social Democrats	66,190	52.20	8	+1
Gibraltar Socialist Labour Party	54,463	42.95	7	–1
Gibraltar National Party	5,932	4.68	0	0
Independents	214	0.17	0	New
Total	126,799	100.00	15	0
Total votes	16,169	–		
Registered voters/turnout	18,437	87.70		
Source: Elections Today, Parliament

== By candidate ==
The first fifteen candidates were elected to the House of Assembly.

Candidate	Party	Votes	%
Peter Montegriffo (1988-1991)	Gibraltar Social Democrats	8,565	6.75
Peter Caruana (since 1991) (Note: Elected in 1991 by-election after the resignation of former AACR MP and Founder and first GSD Leader, Peter Montegriffo. He had beaten his opponent, AACR's Douglas Henrich (2496 vs 1542 votes).)	Gibraltar Social Democrats	8,561	6.75
Bernard Linares	Gibraltar Social Democrats	8,342	6.58
Hurbert Corby (since 1992)	Gibraltar Social Democrats	8,263	6.52
Keith Azopardi	Gibraltar Social Democrats	8,206	6.47
Joe Holliday	Gibraltar Social Democrats	8,094	6.38
Ernest Britto (since 1992)	Gibraltar Social Democrats	8,093	6.38
James Netto	Gibraltar Social Democrats	8,066	6.36
Joe Bossano (since 1972)	Gibraltar Socialist Labour Party (since 1980)	7,396	5.83
Joseph Baldachino	Gibraltar Socialist Labour Party	6,940	5.47
Maria Montegriffo (since 1984)	Gibraltar Socialist Labour Party	6,876	5.42
Albert Isola	Gibraltar Socialist Labour Party	6,768	5.34
Joshua Gabay	Gibraltar Socialist Labour Party	6,742	5.32
Robert Mor	Gibraltar Socialist Labour Party	6,661	5.25
Juan Carlos Perez	Gibraltar Socialist Labour Party	6,597	5.20
Clive Peter Golt	Gibraltar Socialist Labour Party	6,483	5.11
Joseph Garcia	Gibraltar National Party	1,679	1.32
Steven Linares	Gibraltar National Party	809	0.64
Damon Bossino	Gibraltar National Party	794	0.63
Paul Christopher James Borda	Gibraltar National Party	552	0.44
Elio Victor	Gibraltar National Party	548	0.43
Lyana Patricia Armstrong-Emery	Gibraltar National Party	543	0.43
Anthony Albert Balloqui	Gibraltar National Party	507	0.40
Annette Tunbridge	Gibraltar National Party	500	0.39
Peter Andrew Cumming	Independent	214	0.17
Total		126,799	100.00
Source: Gibraltar Elections
