= Maurice Xiberras =

Gibraltarian teacher, trade unionist and former politician

The Honourable Maurice Donald Xiberras MHA, GMH
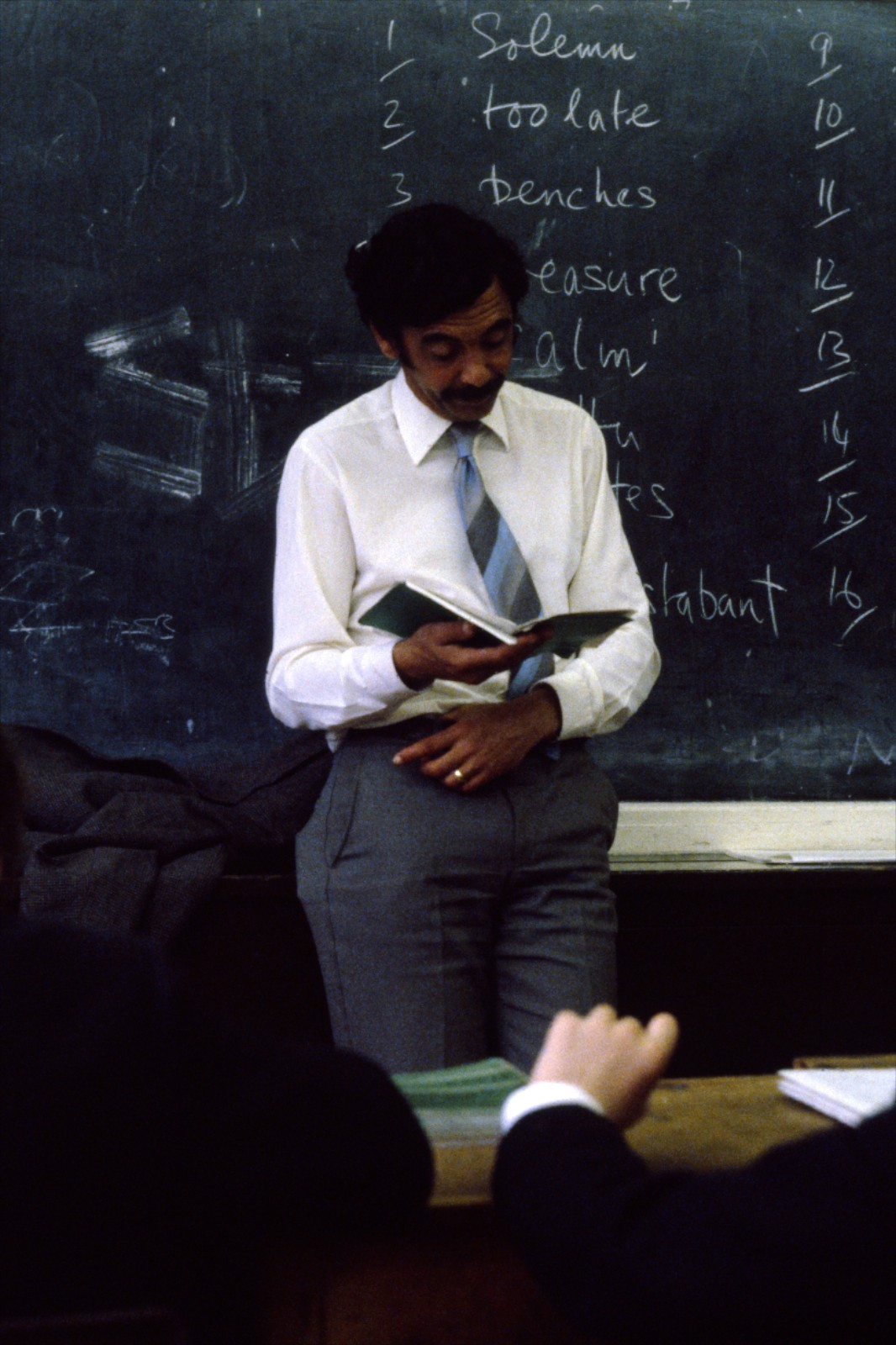
- Maurice Xiberras teaching Latin at Hampton School, London in 1981.

Deputy Chief Minister of Gibraltar
- In office 1969–1972

Leader of the Opposition
- In office 1972–1979

Personal details
- Born: 14 November 1936 The Rock, Gibraltar
- Died: 19 March 2017 (aged 80) Surbiton, London, England
- Party: Integration with Britain Party; Democratic Party of British Gibraltar
- Education: University of Bristol; University of Edinburgh
- Occupation: Politician, teacher
- Website: SurbitonCounselling.co.uk

Maurice Xiberras GMH (14 November 1936 – 19 March 2017) was a Gibraltarian teacher, trade unionist and politician. He was regarded as being a strong defender of British sovereignty, who believed there was no future for Gibraltar without the continuing close relationship with the United Kingdom.

== Education and teaching career ==
Xiberras began his professional career as a teacher. He obtained his Teaching certificate from the University of Bristol, where he later became Assistant Lecturer at its Department of Hispanic Studies from 1961 to 1963. In 1964, prior to becoming a politician, he became one of the top Gibraltarian teachers assisting the Christian Brothers as teacher and Head of Department at the Gibraltar Grammar School. He maintained this position until 1979. The change would mean great sacrifice for him, however, he was encouraged to make the move by UK MPs who reportedly told him that "although he had a great future as a teacher this must be given up for the greater good of Gibraltar!"

He returned to teaching after retiring from politics in 1979. From 1980, he taught history, Spanish, politics and Latin, coached football and cricket and was Senior Counsellor at Hampton School in London, famed for splitting his Latin classes into 'Pansies' and 'Daffodils' for vocabulary tests. He retired from teaching in 2002. Xiberras also held a first class Master of Arts with Honours from the University of Edinburgh.

In 1995 he also obtained a Diploma in psychotherapy from the British Association of Analytical Body Psychotherapy (BAABP) in London.

== Political career ==
An integrationist from the outset – he was involved in the drafting of the Pro Integration Movement's manifesto in 1967 – Xiberras sat alongside Major Robert Peliza as a member of the Integration with Britain Party (IWBP). As a member of its team at the Constitutional Conference chaired by Lord Shepherd in 1968 that drafted the 1969 Gibraltar Constitution. He entered the House of Assembly after the 1969 elections, becoming the Minister for Labour, Social Security, and Housing under the IWBP Government and by 1970 he was the de facto Deputy Chief Minister, deputising for Major Peliza as Chief Minister in his absence. In the 1972 elections he retained his seat, but upon the victory of the Association for the Advancement of Civil Rights (AACR), he moved to the Opposition seats along with his six IWBP colleagues. Almost immediately, in October 1972, he succeeded Major Peliza as party leader and therefore as Leader of the Opposition.

=== Leader of the Opposition ===
As leader of the Opposition during early 1976, he took part in a Gibraltarian inter-party Constitution Committee which began to work on a proposal of constitutional changes that involved a further integration of Gibraltar with the United Kingdom. Xiberras and the then Chief Minister, Joshua Hassan, travelled to London in June 1976 but were unable to convince the Government of the United Kingdom which, in response issued the Hattersley Memorandum which rejected the proposals. This effectively caused the IWBP to disband. Xiberras also accompanied Chief Minister Hassan, in his position as Leader of the Opposition, as part of the British delegation to Strasbourg, France for meetings with Spanish Foreign Minister Marcelino Oreja. This was to be the first official Spanish Government recognition of Gibraltar's elected representatives.

Xiberras renewed his seat in the 1976 elections again, this time as independent, as he had already resigned as leader of the declining IWBP. In 1977, he again took over as Leader of the Opposition, after the decline of the Gibraltar Democratic Movement bench, led by former IWBP member Joe Bossano. However, Xiberras resigned from his seat in the Gibraltar House of Assembly in 1979, due to family commitments and relocated to the United Kingdom. He was succeeded by Peter Isola.

=== Further involvement ===
Although absent from Gibraltar, Xiberras continued his involvement in the politics of Gibraltar by authoring various articles and letters in the local press, opposing the 2002 Joint Sovereignty Deal between the British and Spanish Governments and also the European Constitution, on the ground that it would "make Gibraltar a disputed territory 'in perpetuity'". Xiberras also contested the 2003 elections, obtaining 1,395 votes and therefore not winning a seat at the House of Assembly.

== Other work ==
Xiberras also represented Gibraltar in a variety of sports and was the National Hockey Manager who led the Gibraltar XI to success across Europe.

He offered professional counselling and psychotherapy from his own practice, Surbiton Counselling, in Surbiton.

== Honours ==
Maurice Xiberras was one of the four recipients of the Gibraltar Medallion of Honour in 2009 "for his exceptional service to the political interests of Gibraltar and its people" and was therefore recorded in the Gibraltar Roll of Honour.

== Death ==
Maurice Xiberras died suddenly over the weekend of 18–19 March 2017.

== See also ==
- List of Gibraltarians
- Politics of Gibraltar
