= Mari Montegriffo =

Gibraltarian politician (c.1950–2022)

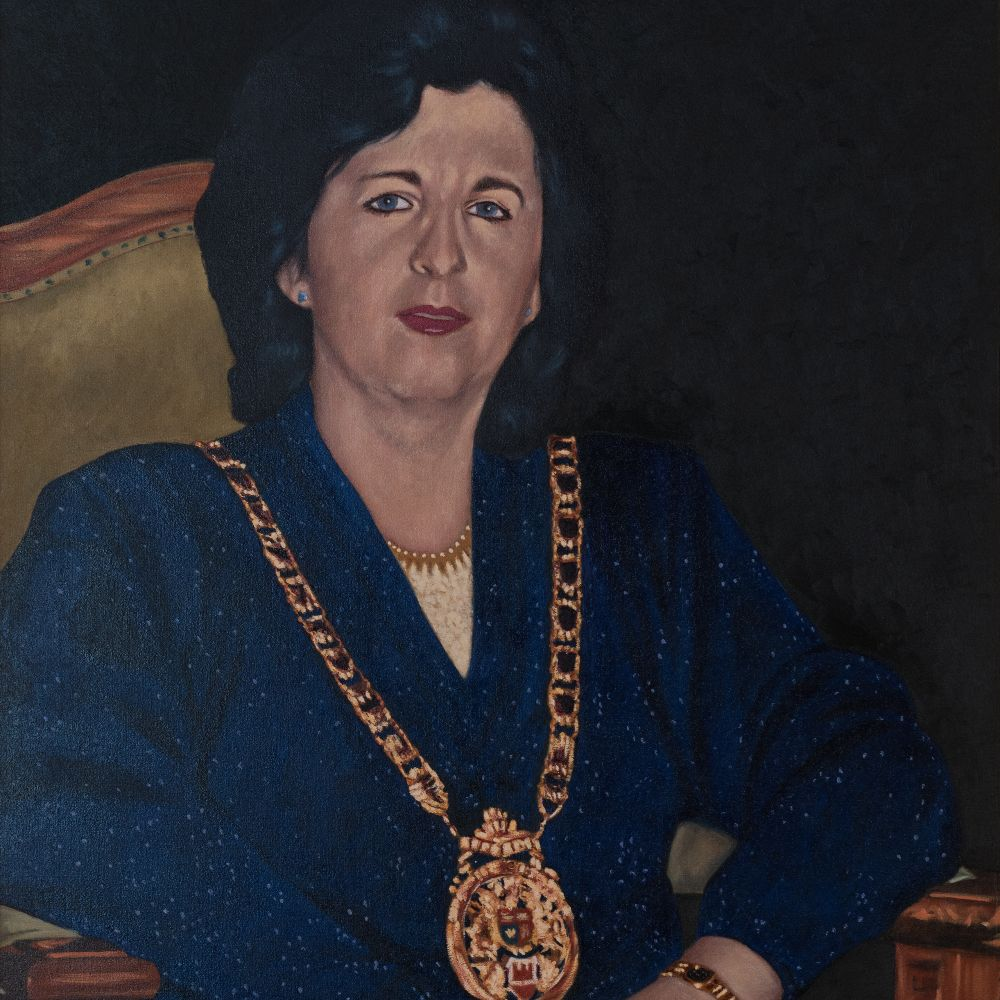
Hon. Mari I. Montegriffo

Maria Isabel Montegriffo, known as Mari Montegriffo (c. 1950 – 18 August 2022) was a Gibraltarian politician. She was a Gibraltar Socialist Labour Party member of the House of Assembly from 1984 to 2007, the first female Mayor of Gibraltar (1988–95), as well as the Minister of Medical Services and Health and the Minister of Sport in Joe Bossano's administration (both 1988–96).

== Career ==
Montegriffo attended the Loreto Convent School, where she was head girl. Aged 17, she became personal secretary to Bob Peliza, the Gibraltarian politician who later became Chief Minister and led the Integration with Britain Party. After five years of working with him, in 1970 she moved to London and worked for the National Data Processing Service for four years. In 1974, she returned to Gibraltar to work in shipping for Blands.

=== Politics ===
While she was working for Blands, Montegriffo met Joe Bossano, a member (and future leader) of the Gibraltar Socialist Labour Party. He was impressed by her and encouraged her to stand for election as the shop steward for a private sector union; she was subsequently elected. Despite her uncle, Aurelio Montegriffo (who was an Association for the Advancement of Civil Rights (AACR) member of the House of Assembly) asking her to join his party, she was convinced that it was moving rightward and in 1980 she joined the GSLP instead. She was elected to its executive council in 1983 and then stood in the 1984 election, becoming the fourth successful candidate with 3,815 votes, which gave her a seat in the House. Bossano made her shadow Minister for Medical and Health Services with an enlarged portfolio covering the environment, sport and computerisation. After the GSLP won the 1988 election, Montegriffo became the Minister for the positions she had shadowed in opposition. In 1988, she was appointed Mayor of Gibraltar by the House of Assembly—the first woman to hold that post—and served until 1996. She remained in the House as a GSLP member until retiring in 2007.

During her tenure in Government, the administration reclaimed land, provided scholarships for further education pupils and privatised utilities companies. As Minister of Sport, Montegriffo allowed schools and communities to use the country's sporting facilities and oversaw the renovation of the Victoria Stadium; in 1995, Gibraltar hosted the Islands Games. As Minister of Health, she refurbished St Bernard's Hospital and expanded the healthcare budget from £8 million in 1988 to £23 million when she left office eight years later. She also abolished private practice by doctors working for the Health Authority and private rooms in St Bernard's were stopped. Doctors had to be registered with the General Medical Council.

Montegriffo died on 18 August 2022, at the age of 72.
