= Lloyd DeVincenzi Sr. =

Gibraltarian businessman and politician (1933–2001)

The Hon. Lloyd Cecil Joseph DeVincenzi (Lloyd DeVincenzi Sr.) (6 March 1933 – 29 April 2001) was a Gibraltarian businessman and politician who was Minister for Education and Recreation between 1969 and 1972 under Robert Peliza in the first Gibraltar House of Assembly. A member of the Integration with Britain Party (IWBP). DeVincenzi was elected in the 1969 Gibraltar general election, contested between the IWBP, AACR and Isola Group.

== Career ==
DeVincenzi worked at his father's bakery as a young man, located in the south district of Gibraltar. He was also a member of the Royal Gibraltar Regiment (at the time the Gibraltar Defence Force), for a short period of time.

DeVincenzi ran in the 1969 Gibraltar general election as a member of the Integration with Britain Party. He was elected as one of the 15 members of the House of Assembly, and made minister for Education and Recreation, notably opening the Victoria Stadium, now a part of the wider Bayside Sports Complex. He served in his ministerial role between 1969 and 1972. In the 1972 Gibraltar general election, DeVincenzi was again elected into the House of Assembly, however the IWBP were not reelected, losing out to the AACR. DeVincenzi served as a shadow Minister between 1972 and 1976.

DeVincenzi founded Lloyd's Enterprises Ltd, in Gibraltar, a food importer and supplier company, which still operates under the same name and purpose. DeVincenzi sold the company when moving to Canada with his family.

== Personal life ==
DeVincenzi was born in Gibraltar to a Gibraltarian father of Italian (Genoese) descent, Adolfo DeVincenzi, and Gibraltarian mother of English descent, Jane DeVincenzi (née Golding). He had five sisters and one brother. DeVincenzi was evacuated to Casablanca and Gibraltar Camp in Mona, Jamaica during the Evacuation of the Gibraltarian civilian population during World War II.

DeVincenzi was an avid athlete, a founder of the Calpeans Athletics Club in 1954 and member of the Calpe Rowing Club, both of which still operate today.

DeVincenzi married Maria del Carmen DeVincenzi (née Gilbert) a fellow Gibraltarian evacuee, in 1962. They had two children. Denise, born November 1964, and Lloyd Jr. born January 1968.

After leaving office as a minister, and with the border between Gibraltar and Spain closed, DeVincenzi and his family immigrated to Calgary, Alberta, Canada in November 1978. They returned to Gibraltar in the 1990s.
