= 1972 Gibraltar general election =

- 23 June 1972
- 15 of the 17 seats in the House of Assembly; 8 seats needed for a majority
Party	Leader	Seats	+/–
AACR	Joshua Hassan	8	+1
IWBP	Robert Peliza	7	+2
This lists parties that won seats. See the complete results below.
Chief Minister before	Chief Minister after
Robert Peliza; IWBP	Joshua Hassan; AACR

Early general elections were held in Gibraltar on 23 June 1972. The result was a victory for the Association for the Advancement of Civil Rights, which won eight of the 15 seats in the House of Assembly.

== Background ==
The 1969 elections had seen the Association for the Advancement of Civil Rights emerge as the largest party in the legislature, winning seven of the 15 seats. However, the opposition Integration with Britain Party and the Isola Group between them held eight seats, and were able to form a government. In 1972 a member of the Isola Group defected, resulting in early elections being called.

== Electoral system ==
The electoral system for the House of Assembly allowed each voter to vote for up to eight candidates.

== Results ==
Party	Seats	+/–
Association for the Advancement of Civil Rights	8	+1
Integration with Britain Party	7	+2
Isola Group	0	–1
Total	15	0
Source: McHale

=== By candidate ===
Candidate	Party	Votes	%	Notes
Joshua Hassan	Association for the Advancement of Civil Rights	5,001	6.84	Elected
Adolfo Canepa	Association for the Advancement of Civil Rights	4,770	6.53	Elected
Aurelius Peter Montegriffo	Association for the Advancement of Civil Rights	4,713	6.45	Elected
Isaac Abecasis	Association for the Advancement of Civil Rights	4,712	6.45	Elected
Maurice Kenneth Featherstone	Association for the Advancement of Civil Rights	4,681	6.40	Elected
Abraham Serfaty	Association for the Advancement of Civil Rights	4,670	6.39	Elected
Horace J. Zammitt	Association for the Advancement of Civil Rights	4,604	6.30	Elected
James Leonard Hoare	Association for the Advancement of Civil Rights	4,571	6.25	Elected
Robert Peliza	Integration with Britain Party	4,516	6.18	Elected
Maurice Xiberras	Integration with Britain Party	4,502	6.16	Elected
Peter Isola	Integration with Britain Party	4,496	6.15	Elected
William Isola	Integration with Britain Party	4,411	6.03	Elected
Joseph Bossano	Integration with Britain Party	4,383	6.00	Elected
Joseph Caruana	Integration with Britain Party	4,369	5.98	Elected
Lloyd Devincenzi Sr.	Integration with Britain Party	4,361	5.97	Elected
Angela Smith	Independent	4,339	5.94	
Total		73,099	100.00	
Source: Parliament
