= 1969 Gibraltar general election =

- 30 July 1969
- 15 of the 17 seats in the House of Assembly; 8 seats needed for a majority
- Turnout: 71.43%
Party	Leader	Vote %	Seats	+/–
AACR	Joshua Hassan	43.64	7	+2
IWBP	Robert Peliza	32.67	5	New
Isola Group	William and Peter Isola	17.09	3	New
This lists parties that won seats. See the complete results below.
Chief Minister before	Chief Minister after
Joshua Hassan; AACR	Robert Peliza; IWBP

General elections were held in Gibraltar on Wednesday 30 July 1969. The Association for the Advancement of Civil Rights remained the largest party in the House of Assembly, winning seven of the 15 seats. However, the opposition Integration with Britain Party and Isola Group held eight seats between them and were able to form a government, marking the first time since 1950 that the AACR had been out of power.

== Background ==
The elections were the first to the House of Assembly created under the new constitution, and were called for 30 July 1969. The atmosphere differed markedly from that of the preceding years: the cross-party consensus that had prevailed since a coalition government was formed in 1965 had faded, with the connection to Britain secured and the pressure from Spain appearing to have eased.

== Electoral system ==
The single transferable vote system used at previous elections was replaced by plurality voting in a single constituency, with each elector limited to eight votes for the fifteen seats. This form of limited voting was intended to stop a single party sweeping the Assembly; a party seeking to govern alone needed to field and elect a full slate of eight candidates, which would yield a one-seat majority and leave the remaining seven seats to the opposition.

Polling took place on Wednesday 30 July 1969 between 09:00 and 22:00. Nine polling stations were provided: Victoria Stadium on Winston Churchill Avenue; the New Lourdes School on Bayside Road; the Plater Youth Club (the former Lourdes School) on Castle Road; the Child Welfare Clinic in Casemates Square; the F. & S. Club on Cornwall's Parade; St George's School on Line Wall Road; St Christopher's School on Town Range; St Joseph's Junior School on Alameda Parade; and St Joseph's Infants School on Scud Hill.

== Campaign ==
Nineteen candidates were validly nominated to contest the fifteen seats, as notified in the Gibraltar Gazette on 18 July. The Association for the Advancement of Civil Rights (AACR) fielded eight candidates under Joshua Hassan, while the Integration with Britain Party (IWBP), led by Major Robert Peliza, fielded six. The IWBP had announced a slate of eight at a meeting on 1 July, but two of those named did not ultimately stand: Joseph Bossano, later Chief Minister of Gibraltar, and a candidate reported as D. Abecasis. Bossano, who had recently returned from England, arrived late at the meeting and told it that he was concerned at having been out of contact with the party. Peter Isola, his brother William and Major Alfred Gache stood as the right-wing Isola Group, and Augustus Victor Stagnetto (Note: Garcia refers to this candidate as Guy Stagnetto; the official results record him as Augustus Victor Stagnetto.) and Anthony Baldorino ran as independents.

A question over candidate eligibility also arose during the campaign. In the late 1950s the Colonial Secretary, Alan Lennox-Boyd, had ruled that government and dockyard employees in Grade I and below could stand for election, and several dockyard workers had done so; the enabling provision was later repealed without replacement. The Gibraltar Chronicle reported on 8 July that, unless the position were resolved, three of the candidates already named risked being disqualified because they were government employees: Francis Gonzalez of the AACR, and Julius Gonzalez and D. Abecasis of the IWBP. Hassan told an AACR meeting that if Francis Gonzalez were disqualified, Albert Risso would return to politics despite having intended to retire. Both Gonzalezes were in the event able to stand, while D. Abecasis did not appear on the final ballot.

In the final week of the campaign the IWBP advertised a series of radio and television addresses by its candidates. The notice, which appeared on 23, 25 and 26 July, listed Concepcion Anes on 23 July, Joseph Caruana and Lloyd DeVincenzi on 24 July, Julius Gonzalez and Robert Peliza on 27 July, Maurice Xiberras on 28 July, and Caruana and Peliza again on 29 July.

On polling day Hassan married Marcelle Bensimon at the Gibraltar register office, next door to a polling station, before resuming his campaigning.

== Results ==
Party	Votes	%	Seats	+/–
Association for the Advancement of Civil Rights	31,368	43.64	7	+2
Integration with Britain Party	23,481	32.67	5	New
Isola Group	12,285	17.09	3	New
Independents	4,742	6.60	0	–6
Total	71,876	100.00	15	+4
Total votes	10,318	–		
Registered voters/turnout	14,445	71.43		
Source: McHale, Parliament, Belfast Telegraph, Gibraltar Chronicle (Note: Under the limited-voting system each elector could cast up to eight votes, so the party figures are the combined votes received by each party's candidates rather than the number of electors supporting each party; the percentages are shares of the 71,876 votes cast. The totals are calculated from the individual candidate results, using the party affiliations of Francis Gonzalez and Julius Gonzalez reported by the Gibraltar Chronicle.)

=== By candidate ===
Hassan received the most votes of any candidate, with Peter Isola in second place, an outcome attributed to the standing both men had gained from representing Gibraltar at the United Nations in New York.

Candidate	Party	Votes	%	Notes
Joshua Hassan	Association for the Advancement of Civil Rights	7,086	9.86	Elected
Peter Isola	Isola Group	5,688	7.91	Elected
Robert Peliza	Integration with Britain Party	5,495	7.65	Elected
Maurice Xiberras	Integration with Britain Party	5,414	7.53	Elected
Abraham Serfaty	Association for the Advancement of Civil Rights	3,956	5.50	Elected
Aurelius Peter Montegriffo	Association for the Advancement of Civil Rights	3,872	5.39	Elected
Emilius Joseph Alvarez	Association for the Advancement of Civil Rights	3,817	5.31	Elected
Maurice Kenneth Featherstone	Association for the Advancement of Civil Rights	3,691	5.14	Elected
Alfred Joseph Gache	Isola Group	3,566	4.96	Elected
Isaac Abecasis	Association for the Advancement of Civil Rights	3,461	4.82	Elected
Concepcion Anes	Integration with Britain Party	3,406	4.74	Elected
Joseph Caruana	Integration with Britain Party	3,405	4.74	Elected
Lloyd DeVincenzi Sr.	Integration with Britain Party	3,283	4.57	Elected
William Isola	Isola Group	3,031	4.22	Elected
James Leonard Hoare	Association for the Advancement of Civil Rights	2,921	4.06	Elected
Augustus Victor Stagnetto	Independent	2,815	3.92	
Francis Gonzalez	Association for the Advancement of Civil Rights	2,564	3.57	
Julius Gonzalez	Integration with Britain Party	2,478	3.45	
Anthony John Baldorino	Independent	1,927	2.68	
Total		71,876	100.00	
Source: Parliament, Gibraltar Gazette, Garcia, Gibraltar Chronicle

== Aftermath ==
The Assembly was presided over by a Speaker appointed by the Governor (then Admiral of the Fleet Sir Varyl Begg), W. Thomson, who had previously been Speaker of the former Legislative Council. It also included two ex officio members: the Attorney-General, C. B. O'Beirne, and the Financial and Development Secretary, E. H. Davies. J. T. Summerfield served as Clerk.

With no grouping able to govern alone, the Isola Group rejected an AACR offer of two ministerial posts on 4 August. The Governor, Sir Varyl Begg, then suggested that Hassan take office with the support of the two official members, the Financial Secretary and the Attorney-General. Hassan declined, since the officials were barred from voting on confidence motions and he did not wish to be seen as owing his position to the Governor.

The Isola Group instead approached the IWBP. An alliance appeared unlikely, given the gulf between the right-wing Isola camp and the left-leaning integrationists, Peter Isola's preference for free association rather than integration as the route to decolonisation, and Gache's strong criticism of the integrationists during the campaign. Nevertheless, the two groups announced on 6 August that they would form a coalition based on the five points agreed in 1968, motivated in part by a shared desire to keep the AACR from office. Peliza became Chief Minister. W. Thomson, previously Speaker of the Legislative Council, served as the first Speaker of the House of Assembly and was succeeded in 1972 by Alfred Vasquez, formerly leader of the Commonwealth Party and the first civilian to hold the office. The appointment of a civilian Speaker was later seen as reflecting the shift of authority from the British military establishment towards local self-government.

The coalition was fragile from the outset, united chiefly by opposition to the AACR. It also faced scepticism in London, where the government was wary of integration following the failed attempt to integrate Malta in the 1950s and was reluctant to antagonise Spain while relations over Gibraltar remained tense.
