= 1976 Gibraltar general election =

- 29 September 1976
- 15 of the 17 seats in the House of Assembly; 8 seats needed for a majority
Party	Leader	Seats	+/–
AACR	Joshua Hassan	8	0
GDM	Joe Bossano	4	New
Independents	–	3	+3
This lists parties that won seats. See the complete results below.
Chief Minister before	Chief Minister after
Joshua Hassan; AACR	Joshua Hassan; AACR

General elections were held in Gibraltar on 29 September 1976 . The result was a victory for the Association for the Advancement of Civil Rights, which won eight of the 15 seats in the House of Assembly.

== Electoral system ==
The electoral system for the House of Assembly allowed each voter to vote for up to eight candidates.

== Results ==
Party	Seats	+/–
Association for the Advancement of Civil Rights	8	0
Gibraltar Democratic Movement	4	New
Commonwealth Party	0	New
Independents	3	+3
Total	15	0
Source: McHale

=== By candidate ===
Candidate	Party	Votes	%	Notes
Joshua Hassan	Association for the Advancement of Civil Rights	7,225	8.67	Elected
Maurice Xiberras	Independent	6,029	7.23	Elected
Adolfo Canepa	Association for the Advancement of Civil Rights	5,916	7.10	Elected
Horace J. Zammitt	Association for the Advancement of Civil Rights	5,293	6.35	Elected
Joseph Bossano	Gibraltar Democratic Movement	5,021	6.03	Elected
Aurelius Peter Montegriffo	Association for the Advancement of Civil Rights	4,883	5.86	Elected
Francis Jesus Dellipiani	Association for the Advancement of Civil Rights	4,494	5.39	Elected
Isaac Abecasis	Association for the Advancement of Civil Rights	4,454	5.34	Elected
Abraham Serfaty	Association for the Advancement of Civil Rights	4,364	5.24	Elected
Maurice Kenneth Featherstone	Association for the Advancement of Civil Rights	3,757	4.51	Elected
Peter Isola	Independent	3,608	4.33	Elected
Robert Peliza	Independent	3,383	4.06	Elected
Reginald G. Valarino	Gibraltar Democratic Movement	3,368	4.04	Elected
John Brian Perez	Gibraltar Democratic Movement	2,969	3.56	Elected
Gerald Restano	Gibraltar Democratic Movement	2,447	2.94	Elected
Cecil Isola	Gibraltar Democratic Movement	2,205	2.65	
Joseph Michael Victory	Gibraltar Democratic Movement	2,032	2.44	
George Mascarenhas	Gibraltar Democratic Movement	1,988	2.39	
William Isola	Gibraltar Democratic Movement	1,926	2.31	
James Brooking	Gibraltar Democratic Movement	1,851	2.22	
Joseph Triay	Independent	1,727	2.07	
Joseph Gingell	Independent	1,636	1.96	
Eric Charles Ellul	Independent	1,292	1.55	
Mesod Benady	Independent	976	1.17	
Alfred Joseph Gache	Independent	491	0.59	
Total		83,335	100.00	
Source: Parliament
