= Albert Isola =

Gibraltarian barrister and former politician (born 1963)

The Honourable Albert Isola CBE
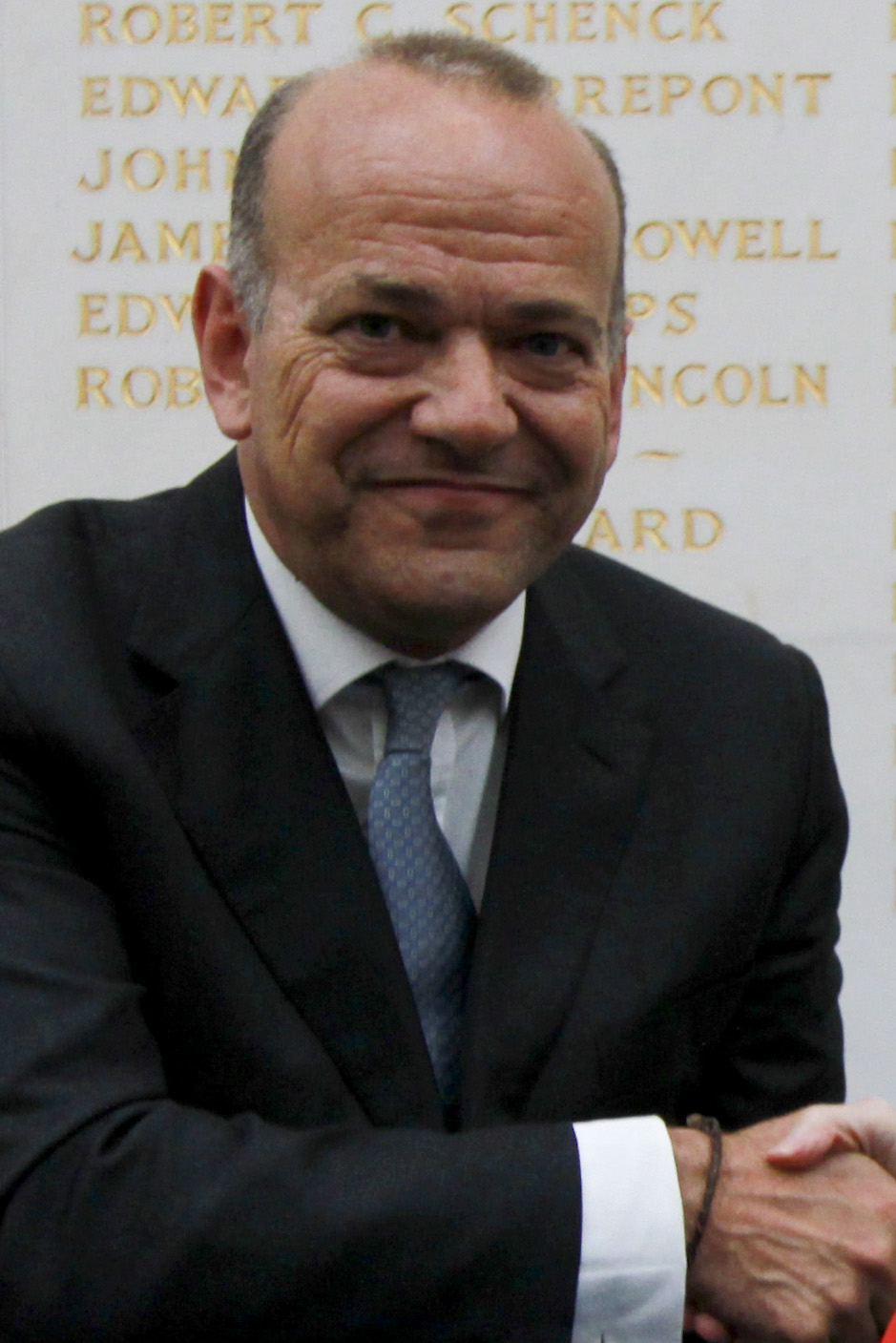

Minister for Financial Services and Gaming
- In office 4 July 2013 – 12 October 2023

Gibraltar Member of Parliament
- In office 4 July 2013 – 12 October 2023
- In office 16 May 1996 – 10 February 2000

Personal details
- Born: 27 September 1963 Gibraltar
- Party: Gibraltar Socialist Labour Party (GSLP) (since 1986)
- Parent: Peter Isola (father)
- Education: Kingston University
- Occupation: Barrister; Politician
- Website: https://gibraltarlawyers.com/people/the-hon-albert-j-isola/

Albert Joseph Isola CBE (born 27 September 1963) is a Gibraltarian barrister and former politician, member of the Gibraltar Socialist Labour Party (GSLP). He was a member of the Gibraltar House of Assembly as part of the Opposition between 1996 and 2000. He later became a Government Minister for Financial Services and Gaming after becoming elected to Parliament in the 2013 by-election. Isola is married and has four children. On 15 September 2023, it was announced that he and fellow party MPs and Ministers, Paul Balban and Samantha Sacramento, would not stand for re-election.

== Biography ==
Albert Isola comes from a traditional family of lawyers, with businesses in Gibraltar since 1892. He studied at Stonyhurst College, Lancashire, between 1973 and 1980 and studied law at Kingston University (1980–1983), before being admitted to the Bar for England and Gibraltar in 1985.

Isola supported the GSLP since 1986, and was elected to the House of Assembly in 1996. He remained a Member of Parliament until 2000. In 2000, he left politics to devote himself to his family and business. After the death of Charles Bruzon, he ran for Member of Parliament in a parliamentary by-election.

Isola was elected with 4,899 votes (50%) and nominated as Minister for Financial Services and Gaming by the Chief Minister, Fabian Picardo.

Isola was appointed Commander of the Order of the British Empire (CBE) in the 2024 New Year Honours for services to the financial and digital industries in Gibraltar.
