= 1984 Gibraltar general election =

- 26 January 1984

15 of the 17 seats in the House of Assembly 8 seats needed for a majority
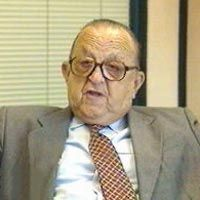

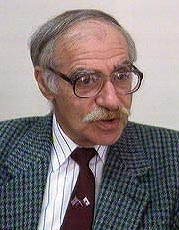
	Majority party	Minority party
Leader	Joshua Hassan	Joe Bossano
Party	AACR	Socialist Labour
Seats won	8	7
Popular vote	42,460	32,534
Percentage	44.39%	34.18%
Chief Minister before election
Joshua Hassan
AACR
Elected Chief Minister
Joshua Hassan
AACR

General elections were held in Gibraltar on 26 January 1984. The Association for the Advancement of Civil Rights (AACR) administration of Joshua Hassan was re-elected for a further term.

The election was referred to as the "dockyard election", as the future of the Gibraltar Royal Naval Dockyard was the only significant campaign issue.

== Background ==
Under the constitution of 1969, in the 1980s the Gibraltar House of Assembly had seventeen seats, two held by official members appointed by the Governor of Gibraltar (the attorney-general and the financial secretary), and fifteen others elected at-large by the whole electorate in a single Gibraltar-wide constituency. A party or coalition winning eight seats in the Assembly had an effective majority and formed the government.

The Association for the Advancement of Civil Rights (called in full the "Gibraltar Labour Party Association for the Advancement of Civil Rights") had been the dominant political force in Gibraltar since the Second World War, winning every election but one. Hassan had been Chief Minister since 1964, apart from the three years between 1969 and 1972, and the previous election, held on 6 February 1980, had produced a House of Assembly with eight AACR members, six from the opposition Democratic Party for a British Gibraltar, and one other, Joe Bossano, leader of the Gibraltar Socialist Labour Party. Despite his party's five other candidates all losing, Bossano had had a personal triumph, polling only sixty-four fewer votes than Hassan.

== Campaign ==
The election was called "the dockyard election", as almost the only campaign issue was the British Government's plans, agreed with Hassan's AACR government, to transfer the Gibraltar Royal Naval dockyard to Appledore International, with new investment from Britain of £ 28 million, but with a loss of some four hundred jobs. In the circumstances, the election amounted to a referendum on these proposals. Hassan and his AACR campaigned in favour of the deal, on the slogan "the only way ahead". Hassan stated firmly "I have obtained a very fair package and I feel a duty to see it implemented over the next four years. No one could have obtained a better deal." However, both of the leading opposition parties, the Democratic Party for a British Gibraltar led by Peter Isola and the Socialist Labour Party of Joe Bossano, campaigned against. The Democrats' platform was that on winning the election they would renegotiate the deal and press Britain for a further £5 million to pay for economic diversification. The leader of the Socialist Labour Party, Bossano, was also a leading member of the Transport and General Workers Union, the biggest labour organization in Gibraltar, and his position was that Appledore should be sent packing and the British government's £28 million should be spent "to relaunch Gibraltar's economy on a sounder and more durable foundation".

== Results ==
The turnout on 26 January 1984 was 74%, one of the highest ever known for a Gibraltar election. Despite the re-election of Hassan's AACR administration, all eight of its candidates being elected to the House of Assembly, there was a dramatic turn of events in the politics of Gibraltar, with Isola's Democratic Party, the main opposition to the AACR since 1980, losing all six of its seats, and Bossano's Socialist Labour Party winning seven and taking over as the official opposition. Bossano himself came third in the at-large election, beating six of the winning party's candidates. In a touch of irony, his party's only losing candidate was surnamed "Victory".

Party	Votes	%	Seats	+/–
Association for the Advancement of Civil Rights	42,260	44.39	8	0
Gibraltar Socialist Labour Party	32,534	34.18	7	+6
Democratic Party for a British Gibraltar	17,967	18.87	0	–6
Independents	2,433	2.56	0	0
Total	95,194	100.00	15	0
Total votes	12,626	–		
Registered voters/turnout	16,960	74.45		
Source: Parliament

=== By candidate ===
The first fifteen candidates were elected to the House of Assembly.

Candidate	Party	Votes
Joshua Hassan	AACR	6,644
Adolfo Canepa	AACR	6,098
Joe Bossano	Socialist Labour Party	5,899
Reggie Valarino	AACR	5,160
Brian Perez	AACR	5,051
Maurice Kenneth Featherstone	AACR	4,997
Francis Jesus Dellipiani	AACR	4,857
George Mascarenhas	AACR	4,795
Horace John Zammitt	AACR	4,658
Joseph Ernest Pilcher	Socialist Labour Party	4,160
Michael Alfred Feetham	Socialist Labour Party	3,934
Maria Isabel Montegriffo	Socialist Labour Party	3,815
Juan Carlos Perez	Socialist Labour Party	3,711
Joseph Louis Baldachino	Socialist Labour Party	3,700
Robert Mor	Socialist Labour Party	3,685
Joseph Michael Victory	Socialist Labour Party	3,630
Peter Isola	Democratic Party for a British Gibraltar	2,946
Robert Peliza	Democratic Party for a British Gibraltar	2,804
Andrew J. Haynes	Democratic Party for a British Gibraltar	2,333
William Thomas Scott	Democratic Party for a British Gibraltar	2,130
Eric J. Hoare	Democratic Party for a British Gibraltar	2,061
Anthony Thomas Loddo	Democratic Party for a British Gibraltar	2,002
James Dominic Rosado	Democratic Party for a British Gibraltar	1,912
Anthony A. Carreras	Independent	1,784
Cecil A. Isola	Democratic Party for a British Gibraltar	1,779
David Cohen	Independent	354
Charles J. Culatto	Independent	295
Source: Parliament of Gibraltar
