= 1980 Gibraltar general election =

- 6 February 1980
- 15 of the 17 seats in the House of Assembly; 8 seats needed for a majority
Party	Leader	Seats	+/–
AACR	Joshua Hassan	8	0
DPBG	Peter Isola	6	+2
Socialist Labour	Joe Bossano	1	New
This lists parties that won seats. See the complete results below.
Chief Minister before	Chief Minister after
Joshua Hassan; AACR	Joshua Hassan; AACR

General elections were held in Gibraltar on 6 February 1980. The result was a victory for the Association for the Advancement of Civil Rights, which won eight of the 15 seats in the House of Assembly.

== Electoral system ==
The electoral system for the House of Assembly allowed each voter to vote for up to eight candidates.

== Results ==
Party	Votes	%	Seats	+/–
Association for the Advancement of Civil Rights	28,826	38.57	8	0
Democratic Party for a British Gibraltar	24,638	32.97	6	+2
Gibraltar Socialist Labour Party	17,747	23.75	1	New
Party for the Autonomy of Gibraltar	3,528	4.72	0	0
Total	74,739	100.00	15	0
Total votes	10,636	–		
Registered voters/turnout	16,200	65.65		
Source: McHale, Parliament

=== By candidate ===
Candidate	Party	Votes	%	Notes
Joshua Hassan	Association for the Advancement of Civil Rights	4,970	6.65	Elected
Joe Bossano	Gibraltar Socialist Labour Party	4,906	6.56	Elected
Adolfo Canepa	Association for the Advancement of Civil Rights	4,563	6.11	Elected
Peter Isola	Democratic Party for a British Gibraltar	4,201	5.62	Elected
Robert Peliza	Democratic Party for a British Gibraltar	3,857	5.16	Elected
Gerald Restano	Democratic Party for a British Gibraltar	3,601	4.82	Elected
Isaac Abecasis	Association for the Advancement of Civil Rights	3,478	4.65	Elected
Reginald Valarino	Association for the Advancement of Civil Rights	3,352	4.48	Elected
Maurice Kenneth Featherstone	Association for the Advancement of Civil Rights	3,138	4.20	Elected
Francis Jesus Dellipiani	Association for the Advancement of Civil Rights	3,131	4.19	Elected
Horace J. Zammitt	Association for the Advancement of Civil Rights	3,105	4.15	Elected
Brian Perez	Association for the Advancement of Civil Rights	3,089	4.13	Elected
William Scott	Democratic Party for a British Gibraltar	2,831	3.79	Elected
Anthony Loddo	Democratic Party for a British Gibraltar	2,814	3.77	Elected
Andrew Haynes	Democratic Party for a British Gibraltar	2,810	3.76	Elected
Anthony Carreras	Democratic Party for a British Gibraltar	2,518	3.37	
Michael Feetham	Gibraltar Socialist Labour Party	2,447	3.27	
Francis Martinez	Gibraltar Socialist Labour Party	2,338	3.13	
Joseph Gingell	Gibraltar Socialist Labour Party	2,078	2.78	
Charles Robba	Gibraltar Socialist Labour Party	2,011	2.69	
Cecil Isola	Democratic Party for a British Gibraltar	2,006	2.68	
Joseph Victory	Gibraltar Socialist Labour Party	2,003	2.68	
Louis Sampere	Gibraltar Socialist Labour Party	1,964	2.63	
Eric Charles Ellul	Party for the Autonomy of Gibraltar	1,147	1.53	
Joseph Triay	Party for the Autonomy of Gibraltar	1,103	1.48	
Peter Triay	Party for the Autonomy of Gibraltar	724	0.97	
Tito Benady	Party for the Autonomy of Gibraltar	554	0.74	
Total		74,739	100.00	
Source: Parliament
