= 1988 Gibraltar general election =

- 24 March 1988

15 of the 17 seats in the House of Assembly 8 seats needed for a majority
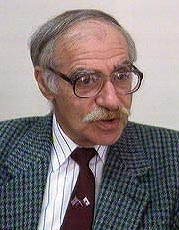

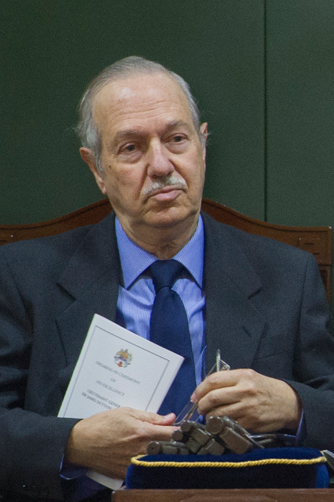
	Majority party	Minority party
Leader	Joe Bossano	Adolfo Canepa
Party	Socialist Labour	AACR
Seats won	8	7
Popular vote	60,626	30,562
Percentage	58.22%	29.35%
Chief Minister before election
Adolfo Canepa
AACR
Elected Chief Minister
Joe Bossano
Socialist Labour

General elections were held in Gibraltar on 24 March 1988. The elections were a watershed in Gibraltar politics, as they saw the first win by the Gibraltar Socialist Labour Party (GSLP), led by Joe Bossano, whose candidates took 58% of the popular vote and eight of the fifteen seats available in the Gibraltar House of Assembly. Bossano's party took control away from the Association for the Advancement of Civil Rights (AACR), under outgoing Chief Minister Adolfo Canepa. The AACR had been the dominant political party in Gibraltar politics for over forty years and had won every election but one since 1945. After this, it was never to win another general election, while Bossano was to remain in office continuously for eight years, from 25 March 1988 to 17 May 1996.

== Results ==
Party	Votes	%	Seats	+/–
Gibraltar Socialist Labour Party	60,626	58.22	8	+1
Association for the Advancement of Civil Rights	30,562	29.35	7	–1
Independent Democrats	12,947	12.43	0	New
Total	104,135	100.00	15	0
Total votes	13,473	–		
Registered voters/turnout	17,530	76.86		
Source: Gibraltar Elections, Parliament

=== By candidate ===
The first fifteen candidates were elected to the House of Assembly.

Candidate	Party	Votes
Joe Bossano	Socialist Labour Party	8,128
Joseph Ernest Pilcher	Socialist Labour Party	7,673
Joseph Louis Baldachino	Socialist Labour Party	7,568
Joseph Louis Moss	Socialist Labour Party	7,510
Maria Isabel Montegriffo	Socialist Labour Party	7,507
Michael Alfred Feetham	Socialist Labour Party	7,505
Robert Mor	Socialist Labour Party	7,496
Juan Carlos Perez	Socialist Labour Party	7,239
Adolfo Canepa	AACR	4,422
Peter Cecil Montegriffo	AACR	4,356
Maurice Kenneth Featherstone	AACR	3,706
George Mascarenhas	AACR	3,698
Ernest Michael Britto	AACR	3,640
Reggie Valarino	AACR	3,626
Kenneth Bartlett Anthony	AACR	3,595
Terry Cartwright	AACR	3,519
Joseph Louis Pitaluga	Independent Democrats	2,091
Marisa Desoiza	Independent Democrats	1,842
Gladys Perez	Independent Democrats	1,689
Joseph Bautista	Independent Democrats	1,503
Richard Michael Desoiza	Independent Democrats	1,497
James Dominic Rosado	Independent Democrats	1,464
Richard B. Pitaluga	Independent Democrats	1,443
Joseph Louis Olivero	Independent Democrats	1,418
Source: Parliament of Gibraltar
