= Concepcion Anes =

Gibraltarian politician (1929/1930–2004)

The Honourable Concepcion Anes MHA

Member of the Gibraltar House of Assembly
- In office 30 July 1969 – 23 June 1972

Personal details
- Born: 1929 or 1930
- Died: 7 August 2004 (aged 74)
- Party: Integration with Britain Party

Concepcion Anes (1929/1930 – 7 August 2004), also referred to as Conchita Anes, was a Gibraltarian politician who served in the House of Assembly from 1969 until 1972 as a member of the Integration with Britain Party.

== Biography ==
Concepcion Anes was born in 1929 or 1930. In the 1969 Gibraltar general election, she was elected to represent the Integration with Britain Party in the House of Assembly, receiving 3,406 votes in the at-large constituency. During her tenure, Anes was considered to be a "key player" in the politics of Gibraltar, and she was appointed a minister in the government of Robert Peliza. Anes left the House of Assembly in 1972, but remained active in local public affairs. Anes died on 7 August 2004.
