= Valarino =

Valarino is a surname. Notable people with the surname include:

- Reggie Valarino (1941–2009), Gibraltarian doctor
- Julian Valarino (born 2000), Gibraltarian footballer
