= Reggie Valarino =

Gibraltarian politician (1941–2009)

The Hon. Dr. Reggie Valarino MB, ChB
- Valarino in March 1985
- In office 1976–unknown

Personal details
- Born: John Reginald Garcia Valarino; 9 June 1941 Madrid, Spain
- Died: 13 March 2009 (aged 67) Gibraltar
- Spouse: Anne Evans (m. 1966, div. 1980) Maria Del Carmen Rodriguez (m. 1980)
- Children: Louise; Kathryn; Gabriella; Jonathan Frederick; Lorna; Belén; Isabella
- Parents: Federico Garcia Montalvo (father); Eugenia Valarino (mother)
- Education: University of Liverpool
- Occupation: Medical Practitioner; Politician

The Hon. Dr. John Reginald Garcia Valarino MB, ChB, better known as Reggie Valarino, (9 June 1941 – 13 March 2009) was a Gibraltarian doctor and politician.

== Early life ==
Dr. Valarino was born in Madrid, Spain, in 1941 to Federico Garcia Montalvo and Eugenia Valarino. His father was a horse trainer and his mother a housewife and seamstress.

== Medical career ==
Dr. Valarino graduated as a medical practitioner from the University of Liverpool and had been working in the field since 1967, having started his professional career in Gibraltar at St Bernard's Hospital. Soon after, he opened his own private practice in Gibraltar.

== Political career ==
Dr. Valarino was first elected to the then House of Assembly (now the Gibraltar Parliament) in the 1976 general election as a member of the Gibraltar Democratic Movement (GDM). He was also a former Minister of the Association for the Advancement of Civil Rights (AACR) through several terms and member of the Gibraltar Socialist Labour Party (GSLP), serving a total of almost 20 years as an elected representative of the people of Gibraltar both in Government and in Opposition.

== Later life and death ==
Dr. Valarino had been a member of a number of public committees. From 1994–1996 he was chairman of the Gibraltar branch of the European Movement. He was regional representative of the British Islands and Mediterranean Region of the Commonwealth Parliamentary Association and was a past secretary of the British Medical Association (Gibraltar branch). He was also Life President of the Gibraltar Hockey Association.

He died on 13 March 2009, aged 67, after a long illness. Following news of his death, the Gibraltar Parliament observed a minute's silence in his memory on 17 March 2009. A memorial service was held for him at the Cathedral of St. Mary the Crowned on 18 March 2009, which filled to capacity with attendees.

== See also ==
- Politics of Gibraltar
- Elections in Gibraltar
