= Gibraltar in Westminster Movement =

Gibraltarian political pressure group

- Formation: 1963 (as Integration With Britain Movement)
- Leader: Joe Caruana

The Gibraltar in Westminster Movement is political pressure group in Gibraltar. The movement's core belief is that the best future for Gibraltar is to become further integrated with the United Kingdom, attaining a state of devolved integration similar to that pertaining in Scotland and Wales. The idea has some support from people living in Gibraltar, but neither the British nor the Gibraltar governments have made any comments on the movement.

== History ==
The movement was originally set up as the Integration With Britain Movement (IWBM) in 1963 and this led to the formation of the Integration with Britain Party (IWBP) in 1967. The IWBP governed Gibraltar between 1969 and 1972. In 1999 a political movement called the "Devolved Integration Movement" was set up in Gibraltar. It engaged in discussions for representation in Westminster with Gibraltarian Governments. In 2011 its name was changed to the "Representation in Westminster Movement". Although it did not fight any elections, it did receive support from the now defunct Independent Liberal Forum (ILF, later known as the Reform Party) as well as from the also now defunct Gibraltar Labour Party.

The Gibraltar in Westminster Movement was set up in the 2010s as successor the IWBP under the leadership of Joe Caruana (not to be confused with Joe Bossano or Peter Caruana).
