= Democratic Party for a British Gibraltar =

Democratic Party for British Gibraltar
- Leader: Joe Bossano; Maurice Xiberras; Peter Isola
- Founded: 1975; 51 years ago
- Dissolved: 1985; 41 years ago
- Split from: Integration with Britain Party; Isola Group
- Ideology: Gibraltarian-British unionism British integrationism Conservatism (after 1980)
- Political position: Big tent

The Democratic Party for a British Gibraltar (DPBG) was a Pro-British political party in Gibraltar.

== History ==
Following the disbandment of the Integration with Britain Party, the Gibraltar Democratic Movement was established in 1976 in response to the British government stating that integration with the United Kingdom or independence were not viable options for the territory.

It was initially led by Joe Bossano, a union leader and founder of the IWBP, and won four seats in the 1976 elections. Prior to the 1980 elections the party was taken over by Peter Isola and was renamed the "Democratic Party for a British Gibraltar". As a result, Bossano left the party to form the Gibraltar Socialist Labour Party.

The 1980 the party won six seats, failing to replace Joshua Hassan's Association for the Advancement of Civil Rights. Following the 1984 elections, the DPBG was replaced by the Gibraltar Socialist Labour Party as the main opposition party, having failed to secure any seats. It was dissolved some time later.
