= 6 Convent Place =

No. 6, Convent Place

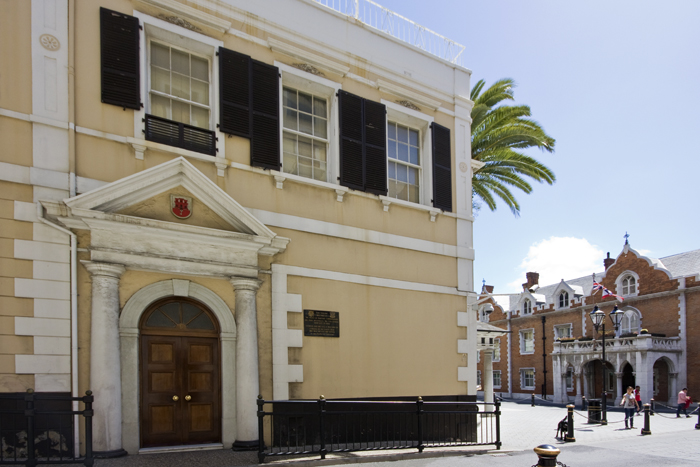
- View of 6 Convent Place with The Convent (the Governor's residence) in the background.

- Location of 6 Convent Place in Gibraltar

General information
- Location: Gibraltar, Gibraltar
- Coordinates: 36.1373°N 5.3528°W
- Client: Chief Minister of Gibraltar

Website
- www.gibraltar.gov.gi

6 Convent Place, colloquially known in Gibraltar as "Number 6", is the headquarters of His Majesty's Government of Gibraltar and the office of the Chief Minister. It is located opposite The Convent, the Governor of Gibraltar's official residence.

Gibraltar's Economic Planning and Statistics Office is located in the building.
