= Ambrose Avellano =

Gibraltarian artist

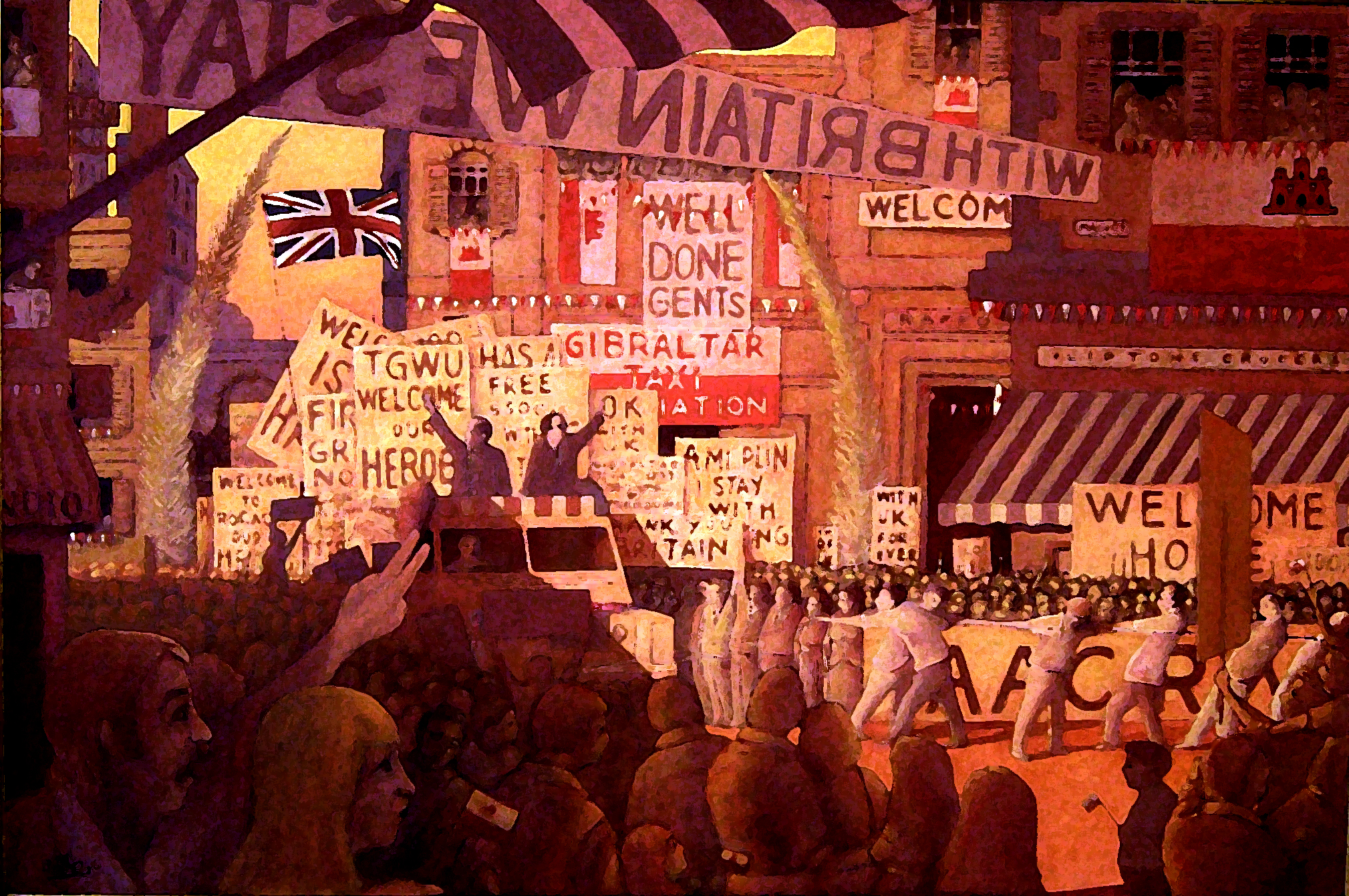
- Ambrose Avellano: The Triumphal Welcome
- Born: 1951 (age 74–75); Gibraltar

Ambrose Avellano (born 1951) is an artist from Gibraltar. He studied art in Lancashire and Manchester in 1980s and early 1990s.

== Biography ==
During his career, which has spanned five decades Avellano has worked in many different techniques and styles: creating drawings, watercolours, oils, enamels, acrylics, photography, digital imaging, sculpture, installation, projections, interactive works and found objects. In 2010 he held a retrospective exhibition in his hometown Gibraltar.

Avellano has been commissioned to create public art in Manchester and Lancashire, and portraits of leading politicians in Gibraltar. He was awarded the British Millennium art award in 2000. He also achieved both first and second prizes in Blands centenary photographic competition in 2009. His large painting The Triumphal Welcome was on display in the Main Guard building in John Mackintosh Square, which is the main square of Gibraltar. The painting commemorates an event in that same square in 1963, after chief minister Sir Joshua Hassan and Peter Isola returned from meetings with the UN Committee, in New York, when they declared that Gibraltar would stay British.
