= Gibraltar Local Disability Movement =

Gibraltar Local Disability Movement logo.

The Gibraltar Local Disability Movement (GLDM) was a pressure group operating in Gibraltar that sought to improve the lives of disabled people, promote equal opportunities, and tackle disability discrimination in Gibraltar.
It was first established in 1985 in response to Gibraltar's lack of infrastructure and facilities for disabled people. The Gibraltar Local Disability Movement ceased to be active for several years during the 1990s and early 2000s but was reactivated in 2005 to address the situation for disabled people in Gibraltar, which did not see great improvement for several years.

It had become apparent to many in the Gibraltarian community that people with disabilities and their families needed disability issues to be addressed. Many found that groups, society, and even the Government of Gibraltar had become distant.

The GLDM website was established on June 27, 2005, with an aim to give people a platform to provide information and voice their views on local disability issues. However, the website appears to have been out of use since the early 2010s, with the GLDM's social media profiles showing little to no activity.

== Objectives ==
The society's main objectives were:

1. To work towards the elimination of discrimination against disabled persons;
2. To promote the equalisation of opportunities for disabled persons;
3. To take such steps as it considers appropriate with a view to encouraging good practice in the treatment of disabled persons;
4. Make proposals or give other advice to any Government Ministers as to any aspect of the law or a proposed change to the law;
5. Make proposals or give other advice to any Government agency or other public authority as to the practical application of any law;
6. Work towards the elimination of discrimination against - and equalize opportunities for - people with disabilities. It will also promote good practice to employers and service providers, provide advice and information and advise the Government about the implementation of the Disability discrimination act.
