= Isola Group =

- Leader: Peter Isola, William Isola
- Merged into: Democratic Party for a British Gibraltar
- Ideology: Pro-business policies
- Political position: Right-wing

The Isola Group was a right-wing political faction in Gibraltar in the late 1960s and early 1970s. It was led by brothers Peter Isola and William Isola, and was deemed to represent the business community.

== History ==
The Group was formed before the 1969 elections, in which it won three of the 15 seats in the House of Assembly. Although the Association for the Advancement of Civil Rights emerged as the largest party with seven seats, the Integration with Britain Party and the Isola Group between them held eight seats, and were able to form a government led by Robert Peliza.

In 1972 one of the Group's members defected, triggering early elections. The Isola Group lost all three seats, and subsequently disbanded. Peter Isola later returned to politics as the leader of the Democratic Party for a British Gibraltar.
