= Hattersley Memorandum =

Report of Constitution Committee

The Memorandum by Her Majesty's Government on the Report of the Constitution Committee, or the Hattersley Memorandum for short (by Roy Hattersley, Minister of State, Foreign and Commonwealth Office of the United Kingdom), dated 26 June 1976, was the answer of the Labour British Government to proposed constitutional changes in Gibraltar ruling out the possibility of integration of Gibraltar with the United Kingdom.

In September 1975, Roy Hattersley (a Minister in the Foreign and Commonwealth Office) had visited Gibraltar and made it clear that the integration with the United Kingdom was not an option for Gibraltar. However, during early 1976, a Gibraltarian inter-party Constitution Committee began to work on a proposal of constitutional changes that involved a closer integration of Gibraltar with the United Kingdom, including responsibility for its affairs being transferred to the Home Office. A delegation of the Constitution Committee visited London in June 1976, but were unable to convince the United Kingdom Government which, as response, issued a memorandum dated 26 June 1976 rejecting the proposals on the grounds of "avoid innovations which might result in prolongation of the frontier restrictions imposed by Spain". The memorandum ruled out the option of integration of Gibraltar with the United Kingdom.

Apart for removing such an option from the constitutional and political development of Gibraltar, it effectively disbanded the Integration with Britain Party, which had been in office from 1969 to 1972, and was the main supporter of the integration of Gibraltar into the United Kingdom.
