= 1992 Gibraltar general election =

- 16 January 1992

15 of the 17 seats in the House of Assembly 8 seats needed for a majority
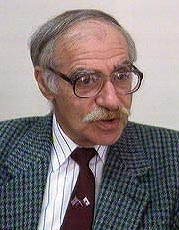

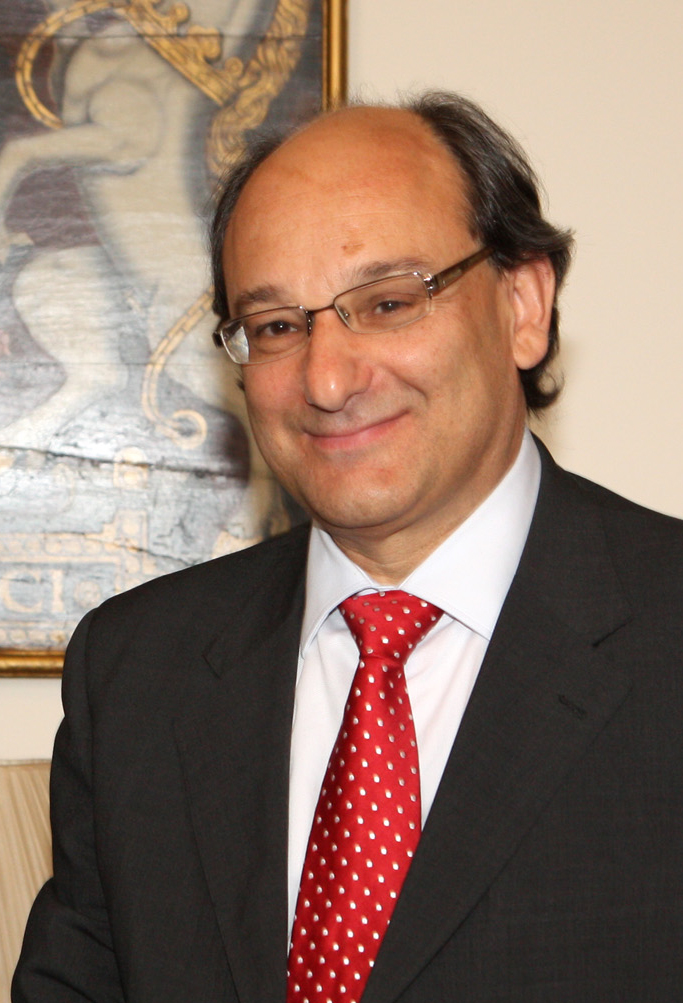
	Majority party	Minority party
Leader	Joe Bossano	Peter Caruana
Party	Socialist Labour	Social Democrats
Seats won	8	7
Popular vote	65,997	18,263
Percentage	73.07%	20.22%
Chief Minister before election
Joe Bossano
Socialist Labour
Elected Chief Minister
Joe Bossano
Socialist Labour

General elections were held in Gibraltar on 16 January 1992. They were won by the Gibraltar Socialist Labour Party led by Joe Bossano, whose candidates took 73.1% of the popular vote and eight of the 15 contested seats, retaining control of the Gibraltar House of Assembly.

== Campaign ==
=== Slogans ===
Party	Slogan
Gibraltar Socialist Labour Party	"Gibraltar 2000"
Gibraltar Social Democrats	
Gibraltar National Party	

== Results ==
Party	Votes	%	Seats	+/–
Gibraltar Socialist Labour Party	65,997	73.07	8	0
Gibraltar Social Democrats	18,263	20.22	7	New
Gibraltar National Party	4,209	4.66	0	New
Independent AACR	1,847	2.05	0	0
Total	90,316	100.00	15	0
Total votes	12,244	–		
Registered voters/turnout	17,087	71.66		
Source: Gibraltar Elections, Parliament

=== By candidate ===
The first fifteen candidates were elected to the House of Assembly.

Candidate	Party	Votes
BOSSANO, Joseph John	Socialist Labour Party	9,228
BALDACHINO, Joseph Louis	Socialist Labour Party	8,527
PEREZ, Juan Carlos	Socialist Labour Party	8,188
MOR, Robert	Socialist Labour Party	8,135
FEETHAM, Michael Alfred	Socialist Labour Party	8,107
MONTEGRIFFO, Maria Isabel	Socialist Labour Party	8,089
MOSS, Joseph Louis	Socialist Labour Party	7,986
PILCHER, Joseph Ernest	Socialist Labour Party	7,737
CARUANA, Peter Richard	Social Democrats	3,065
VASQUEZ, Freddie	Social Democrats	2,354
CORBY, Hubert Alfred	Social Democrats	2,323
BRITTO, Ernest Michael	Social Democrats	2,306
CUMMING, Peter	Social Democrats	2,187
FRANCIS, Lewis Henry	Social Democrats	2,167
RAMAGGE, Maurice	Social Democrats	1,945
OCANA, Louis	Social Democrats	1,916
VALARINO, Reginald G.	Independent AACR	1,847
GARCIA, Joe	National Party	944
GARCIA, Joseph John	National Party	771
AZOPARDI, Keith	National Party	765
CULATTO, Charles James	National Party	452
BORDA, Paul Christopher James	National Party	443
ARMSTRONG-EMERY, Lyana Patricia	National Party	423
FERRO, James	National Party	411
