= Chief Minister of Gibraltar =

Head of government of the British Overseas Territory of Gibraltar

- Coat of arms of HM Government of Gibraltar

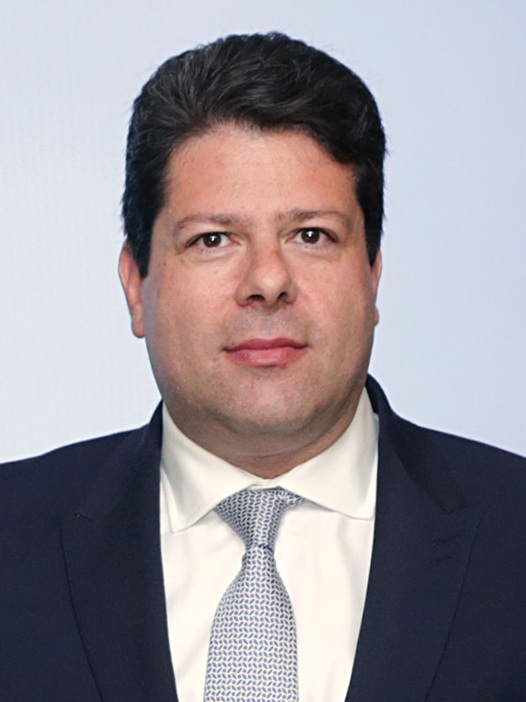
- Incumbent; Fabian Picardo since 9 December 2011
- Style: The Honourable
- Residence: 6 Convent Place
- Appointer: Governor of Gibraltar
- Term length: At the governor's pleasure (Usually 4 years)
- Formation: 11 August 1964; 62 years ago
- First holder: Sir Joshua Hassan
- Salary: £129,145 annually
- Website: Office of the Chief Minister

The chief minister of Gibraltar is the head of His Majesty's Government of Gibraltar who is elected by the Gibraltar Parliament, and formally appointed by the governor of Gibraltar, representative of the British monarch. The incumbent chief minister is Fabian Picardo, since 9 December 2011, leader of the Gibraltar Socialist Labour Party.

== List of chief ministers of Gibraltar ==
| No. | Portrait | Name (Birth–Death) | Term of office & mandate Duration in years and days | | | Party |
|---|---|---|---|---|---|---|
| 1 | | Sir Joshua Hassan (1915–1997) | 11 August 1964 | 6 August 1969 | 1964 | AA Civil Rights |
| 1 | | Sir Joshua Hassan (1915–1997) | 4 years, 360 days | | | AA Civil Rights |
| 2 | | Sir Robert Peliza (1920–2011) | 6 August 1969 | 25 June 1972 | 1969 | Integration with Britain |
| 2 | | Sir Robert Peliza (1920–2011) | 2 years, 324 days | | | Integration with Britain |
| 3 (1) | | Sir Joshua Hassan (1915–1997) | 25 June 1972 | 8 December 1987 | 1972 | AA Civil Rights |
| 3 (1) | | Sir Joshua Hassan (1915–1997) | 25 June 1972 | 8 December 1987 | 1976 | AA Civil Rights |
| 3 (1) | | Sir Joshua Hassan (1915–1997) | 25 June 1972 | 8 December 1987 | 1980 | AA Civil Rights |
| 3 (1) | | Sir Joshua Hassan (1915–1997) | 25 June 1972 | 8 December 1987 | 1984 | AA Civil Rights |
| 3 (1) | | Sir Joshua Hassan (1915–1997) | 15 years, 166 days | | | AA Civil Rights |
| 4 | | Adolfo Canepa (born 1940) | 8 December 1987 | 25 March 1988 | — | AA Civil Rights |
| 4 | | Adolfo Canepa (born 1940) | 108 days | | | AA Civil Rights |
| 5 | | Sir Joe Bossano (born 1939) | 25 March 1988 | 17 May 1996 | 1988 | Socialist Labour |
| 5 | | Sir Joe Bossano (born 1939) | 25 March 1988 | 17 May 1996 | 1992 | Socialist Labour |
| 5 | | Sir Joe Bossano (born 1939) | 8 years, 53 days | | | Socialist Labour |
| 6 | | Sir Peter Caruana (born 1956) | 17 May 1996 | 9 December 2011 | 1996 | Social Democrats |
| 6 | | Sir Peter Caruana (born 1956) | 17 May 1996 | 9 December 2011 | 2000 | Social Democrats |
| 6 | | Sir Peter Caruana (born 1956) | 17 May 1996 | 9 December 2011 | 2003 | Social Democrats |
| 6 | | Sir Peter Caruana (born 1956) | 17 May 1996 | 9 December 2011 | 2007 | Social Democrats |
| 6 | | Sir Peter Caruana (born 1956) | 15 years, 206 days | | | Social Democrats |
| 7 | | Fabian Picardo (born 1972) | 9 December 2011 | Incumbent | 2011 | Socialist Labour |
| 7 | | Fabian Picardo (born 1972) | 9 December 2011 | Incumbent | 2015 | Socialist Labour |
| 7 | | Fabian Picardo (born 1972) | 9 December 2011 | Incumbent | 2019 | Socialist Labour |
| 7 | | Fabian Picardo (born 1972) | 9 December 2011 | Incumbent | 2023 | Socialist Labour |
| 7 | | Fabian Picardo (born 1972) | 14 years, 313 days | | | Socialist Labour |

== See also ==
- List of current heads of government in the United Kingdom and dependencies
- Governor of Gibraltar
