= Politics of Gibraltar =

The politics of Gibraltar takes place within a framework of a parliamentary representative democratic British Overseas Territory, whereby the Monarch of the United Kingdom is the constitutional head of state represented by the Governor of Gibraltar. The Chief Minister of Gibraltar is the head of Government. As a British Overseas Territory, the Government of Gibraltar is not subordinate to the Government of the United Kingdom. The British Government, however, is responsible for defence and external affairs but Gibraltar has full internal self-government under its 2006 Constitution.

The government of Spain continues with an irredentist territorial claim to Gibraltar, which was ceded in perpetuity to the British Crown in 1713 by Article X of the Treaty of Utrecht. In a referendum held in 2002, a proposal for shared sovereignty was overwhelmingly rejected by the Gibraltar electorate with 98.97% voting against. The sovereignty issue remains an important factor in local politics.

Gibraltar has a number of political parties which have developed to address local issues. The preamble to the 2006 Constitution repeated from the 1969 Constitution states that "Her Majesty's Government will never enter into arrangements under which the people of Gibraltar would pass under the sovereignty of another state against their freely and democratically expressed wishes."

== Executive branch ==
The Head of state, King Charles III.

As an overseas territory of Britain, the head of state is King Charles III, who is represented by the Governor of Gibraltar. Britain retains responsibility for defence, foreign relations, internal security and overall financial stability .

Main office-holders
Office	Name	Party	Since
Monarch	King Charles III	N/A	8 September 2022
Governor	Sir Ben Bathurst	N/A	4 June 2024
Chief Minister	Fabian Picardo	GSLP/Liberals Alliance	9 December 2011

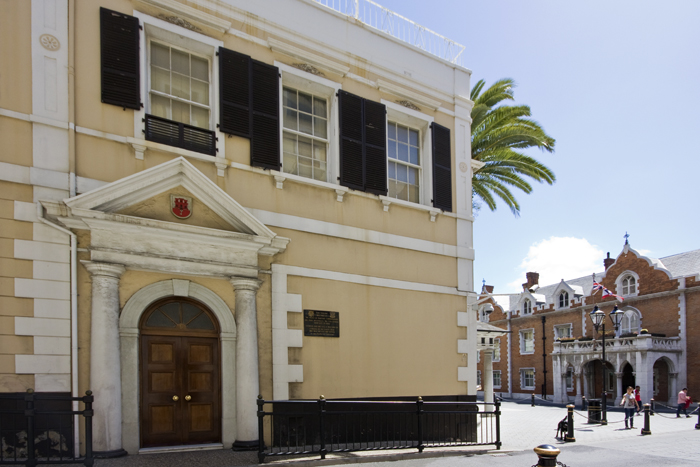
Government of Gibraltar headquarters at No. 6 Convent Place with The Convent in the background.

== Government ==
The Government of Gibraltar is elected for a term of four years. The head of government is the chief minister, currently the Hon. Fabian Picardo of the Gibraltar Socialist Labour Party (GSLP), who has been in office since 9 December 2011, in alliance with the Liberal Party of Gibraltar (Liberals), following the 2011 General Election. The Leader of the Opposition is the Hon. Keith Azopardi of the Gibraltar Social Democrats (GSD) since 2019.

The composition of the Government of Gibraltar is the following:

Picture	Name	Party	Ministerial Role	Responsibilities
Fabian Picardo	The Hon. Fabian Picardo KC, MP	GSLP	Chief Minister	The economy & financial stability (with consultation with the U.K government since they have overall responsibility); Public finance and the Treasury; International representation of Gibraltar and its people; International treaties; Personal status including immigration, residence and adoption; Elections; The Civil Service and the public sector as a whole, including state-owned enterprises; The Government Companies; Customs; ITLD and Digital Services; Cyber-Security and Prevention of Online Harms; Social Security; Broadcasting; The Gibraltar Regulatory Authority; Matters related to Armed Forces Veterans and relationship with the MOD; Chairman, Borders and Coastguard Agency; Chairman, Gibraltar Development Corporation; Constituency MP for Moorish Castle, Calpe and the Upper Town; The administration of Government departments charged with the aforesaid, overall responsibility and supervision of Government departments and public administration
Joseph Garcia	The Hon. Dr. Joseph Garcia, MP	LPG	Deputy Chief Minister	Working in close partnership with the Chief Minister in his exercise of overall responsibility for and supervision of Government departments; External action, coordination of the external action of the Government of Gibraltar in particular; The European Union; The United Nations; Relations with the Commonwealth; International political lobbying; Promotion of the right to self-determination; Work on the future partnership negotiations between the United Kingdom and the European Union; Work on implementation of a Treaty in the event that one is concluded; Work on planning for a No Negotiated Outcome to the Treaty negotiations, in the event that no treaty is concluded; Responsibility for Gibraltar representative offices abroad; Political, democratic and civic reform; Transparency, Open Government and Information; Lands and oversight of Government projects; Civil Aviation; Oversight of manifesto implementation; Constituency MP for the Lower Town; The administration of Government departments charged with the aforesaid.
Joe Bossano	The Hon. Joe Bossano, MP	GSLP	Minister for Economic Development, Enterprise, Telecommunications & the Gibraltar Savings Bank	Economic development and inward investment; Post-Brexit economic plan; International trade; Telecommunications; Enterprise; Public Sector Efficiency; Procurement; Training, apprenticeships and skills; The Gibraltar Savings Bank; Gibraltar National Mint; Constituency MP with Special Responsibility for Senior Citizens; The administration of Government Departments charged with the aforesaid
John Cortes	The Hon. Dr. John Cortes, MP	GSLP	Minister for the Environment, Sustainability, Climate Change and Education	Education; The quality of life; Green Gibraltar; The child-friendly city; The environment; Environmental health; Climate change, conservation and sustainability; Heritage; Upper Rock; Marine resources; Maintenance, administration and operation of tourist sites and beaches; Pollution prevention and control; Urban renewal; Refuse Collection and Disposal; Technical Services Department; Infrastructure; Transport and Urban Mobility including: public service vehicles, public transport, traffic, parking, roads, licensing and vehicles; Implementation of the Sustainable Traffic and Transport Plan (STTP); Developing relations with Morocco; Constituency MP for Alameda Estate and the South District; The administration of Government Departments charged with the aforesaid
	The Hon. Gemma Arias-Vasquez, MP	GSLP	Minister for Health, Care and Business	Gibraltar Health Authority; The Care Agency; Elderly Residential Services; Public Health Gibraltar; The Quality of Care (including the regulation of professionals and services); Business; The Port; Maritime Services including ship and yacht registration; Office of Fair Trading; Town Planning; Procurement; Public Utilities; Chair, AquaGib; Chair, Gibraltar Electricity Authority; Constituency MP for the Westside Area; The administration of Government Departments charged with the aforesaid Government Departments charged with the aforesaid
	The Hon. Leslie Bruzon, MP	LPG	Minister for Industrial Relations, Civil Contingencies and Sport	Sport; Leisure; Industrial Relations; Civil Contingencies; Gibraltar Fire and Rescue Services; Airport Fire and Rescue Services; Constituency MP for the Eastside and Catalan Bay; The administration of Government Departments charged with the aforesaid
	The Hon. Nigel Feetham KC, MP	GSLP	Minister for Justice, Trade and Industry	Financial Services; Gaming; Taxation including Coordination of International Exchange of Information; Postal Services; Data Protection; Chair, Gibtelecom; Justice, including: 1. The Anti-Corruption Authority; 2. Sanctions; 3. The Legal System; 4. Probation Services; 5. Tribunals; 6. Community Services Schemes; 7. Access to justice/legal aid and assistance 8. Law Drafting; 9. Policing; 10. His Majesty's Prison Service of Gibraltar; 11. Safeguarding; Constituency MP for Glacis Estate, Laguna Estate, Ocean Village and Bayside; The administration of Government Departments charged with the aforesaid
	The Hon. Patricia Orfila, MP	GSLP	Minister for Housing	Housing; The Housing Works Agency; Development of affordable, co-ownership estates; Development of rental housing; The University of Gibraltar; Constituency MP for the area of Bayview, Cumberland, Nelson's View, The Anchorage, Rosia Plaza, Rosia Dale and Europa Point; The administration of Government Departments charged with the aforesaid
	The Hon. Christian Santos GMD, MP	GSLP	Minister for Equality, Employment, Culture and Tourism	Equality and minorities; Supported needs (including disability strategy); Employment; Supported Employment; Youth; Training, Apprenticeships and Skills; Health and Safety; Culture; Tourism; Entry points into Gibraltar; Commercial Aviation and Gibraltar Air Terminal Ltd; Chair, inter-ministerial committee on the prevention of drugs misuse, including substance abuse and rehabilitation; The control of drugs misuse including substance abuse, rehabilitation and responsibility for Bruce's Farm; Constituency MP for Varyl Begg Estate, Sir William Jackson Grove and Mid Harbours; The administration of Government Departments charged with the aforesaid

== Legislature ==
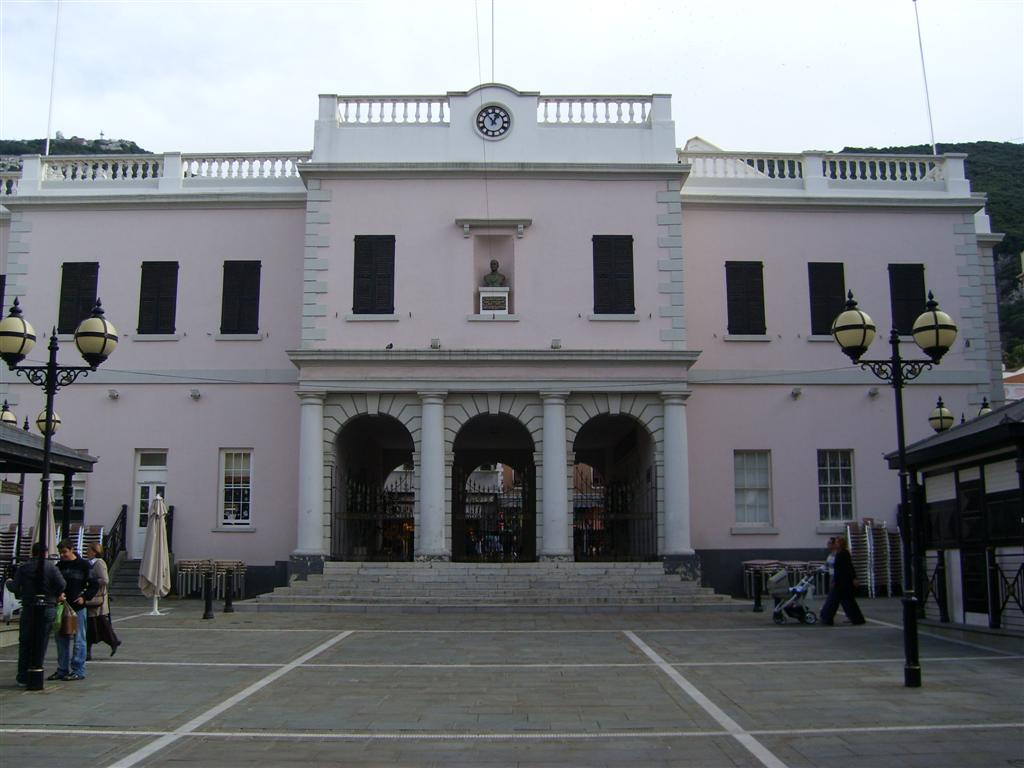
The Gibraltar Parliament Building at John Mackintosh Square.

The Gibraltar Parliament (previously the House of Assembly) consists of seventeen elected members, and the Speaker. Under the electoral system of partial bloc voting used since 1969, voters (since 2007) could choose up to ten candidates, who do not necessarily need to be from the same party (but usually are). The winning candidates are then chosen by simple plurality; consequently, a party seeking to form a government stands ten candidates, and the party that forms the government is usually successful in having all ten of its candidates elected; the remaining seats are usually won by the 'best loser' which then forms the opposition. The last election was held on 17 October 2019. The next election is scheduled to be held on 12 October 2023.

== Governor ==
King Charles III is represented by the governor and commander-in-chief, presently Lieutenant General Sir Ben Bathurst (sworn in June 2024). After an election, the governor appoints the leader of the largest party in the unicameral parliament, as chief minister. The governor is not involved in the day-to-day administration of Gibraltar, and his role is largely as a ceremonial head of state. The governor is responsible for matters of defence and security only.

== Political parties and general elections ==
There are three political parties currently represented in the Gibraltar Parliament: Gibraltar Social Democrats; Gibraltar Socialist Labour Party and the Liberal Party of Gibraltar. All parties support Gibraltar's right to self-determination, and reject any concessions on the issue of sovereignty.

== European Parliament elections ==
Until the United Kingdom's withdrawal from the European Union in January 2020, Gibraltar was part of the EU under the British Treaty of accession, but had not voted in elections for the European Parliament although its membership of the European Union meant it was affected by European Union law. A ten-year campaign to acquire the vote culminated in the case of Matthews v. United Kingdom. Denise Matthews, a British Citizen resident in Gibraltar, claimed that the exclusion of the Gibraltar electorate from enfranchisement in the European Parliamentary elections was a breach of human rights. The European Court of Human Rights decided in her favour, ruling that the European Parliament formed a part of Gibraltar's legislature and held that the UK was bound by its conventions to secure the right for the people of Gibraltar to elect the European Parliament. The UK Government passed the European Parliament (Representation) Act in 2003 to comply with the ruling. Gibraltar was included in the South West England Region for the purposes of European Parliament elections, and first voted in the 2004 election.

The 2004 European Election was the first UK election in which Gibraltar participated. The Conservative Party took 69.52% of the vote, which has generally been interpreted as a protest against the handling of Gibraltar by the Labour Party. The Conservatives also campaigned strongly, with the support of the Gibraltar branch of the party and a visit from the party leader Michael Howard.

In 2009, the Conservatives again topped the poll with 54% but in contrast to 2004 the turnout at 35% was much lower, being comparable to other EU states.

In 2014 the Liberal Democrat Party topped the poll, but the votes cast in South West England resulted in the none of the Liberal Democrat candidates becoming MEPs. Six MEPs were returned, two UKIP, two Conservative, one Labour and one Green.

== Constitutional reform ==
=== Select Committee proposals ===
In 1999, the Government of Gibraltar established a Select Committee on Constitutional Reform, to consider how the 1969 Constitution should be reformed.

In March 2006, British Foreign Secretary Jack Straw announced in the British House of Commons that the details of a new constitution had been agreed. There were some differences between the draft constitution and the one to which the UK agreed, namely that the Governor's title would remain unchanged, and that the Police Authority would remain independent of the Government of Gibraltar.

=== 2006 Constitution ===
In December 2006 Gibraltar was granted a new constitution, providing a modern constitutional relationship between Gibraltar and the United Kingdom, not based on colonialism. The constitution does not in any way diminish British sovereignty of Gibraltar, and the United Kingdom retains its full internal responsibility for Gibraltar, including Gibraltar's external relations and defence, and the Member State responsible for Gibraltar in the European Union.

Writing to the Spanish Foreign Minister, Jack Straw stated:

"My own view [is] that the label "colonial" is misleading and anachronistic in this context; regardless of the United Nations dimension. As Peter Caruana and I said in our joint statement on Monday, the new Constitution provides for "a modern and mature" relationship between the UK and Gibraltar. I do not think that this description would apply to any relationship based on colonialism."

After several months of political wrangling, the Gibraltar Government published the draft Constitution Order, which includes the existing preamble promising that there would be no transfer of sovereignty against the wishes of the Gibraltarians and a new addition explaining the status.

"Whereas Gibraltar is part of Her Majesty’s dominions and Her Majesty’s Government have given assurances to the people of Gibraltar that Gibraltar will remain part of Her Majesty’s dominions unless and until an Act of Parliament otherwise provides, and furthermore that Her Majesty’s Government will never enter into arrangements under which the people of Gibraltar would pass under the sovereignty of another state against their freely and democratically expressed wishes:"

"And whereas the people of Gibraltar have in a referendum held on [date] freely approved and accepted the Constitution annexed to this Order which gives the people of Gibraltar that degree of self-government which is compatible with British Sovereignty of Gibraltar and with the fact that the UK remains fully responsible for Gibraltar’s external relations."

The proposal was put to the people in a referendum and approved. The constitution took effect in 2007 and 29 January declared a public holiday in celebration.

=== Integration with the UK ===
Various groups in Gibraltar have campaigned in favour of a far closer relationship with Britain, in the form of devolved integration or incorporation into Britain itself. This is similar to the offer made to Malta in 1955, under which Malta would be represented in the British House of Commons and be placed under the Home Office, while retaining internal self-government. This would be a similar status to France's overseas departments and to Spain's North African enclaves, Ceuta and Melilla, claimed by Morocco. One of Spain's arguments in rejecting comparisons between Gibraltar and these territories is that they are part of Spain, whereas Gibraltar is a British overseas territory and not part of the UK.

However, the British Foreign Office rejected the idea in 1976, along with independence, on the grounds that any further constitutional reform or decolonisation would have to take into account the so-called "Spanish dimension". Similarly, this has also been opposed by governments in Gibraltar itself; in its election manifesto in 2003, the Gibraltar Social Democrats argued that integration would "necessarily involve the loss of a significant degree of this vital self-government" and "would simply hand power over our vital affairs (and therefore our ability to survive) to people in London."

While there is still attachment to the idea of Gibraltar being British, some, like leader of the Liberal Party, Joseph Garcia, see the Rock's future as being within a larger 'Europe of the Regions', rather than as part of one nation state or another.

=== Condominium ===
The idea of a condominium, with sovereignty over Gibraltar shared between the UK and Spain, has been proposed. In 1985, during talks with British Foreign Secretary Geoffrey Howe, Spanish Foreign Minister Fernando Morán proposed a condominium or leaseback period of between 15 and 20 years, before Spain regained full sovereignty, but this received no reply from the British government.

In 1991, the Spanish Prime Minister, Felipe Gonzalez, was reported to have proposed a plan for joint sovereignty, under which Gibraltar would become effectively autonomous, with the British and Spanish monarchs as joint heads of state, but this was rejected by the Government of Gibraltar in July of that year.

In 1997, the then Spanish Foreign Minister Abel Matutes put forward a proposal for joint sovereignty over Gibraltar, which also entailed full Spanish sovereignty after a transitional period, but his British counterpart, Robin Cook, stated that there was "no question of compromise on sovereignty".

Although the co-principality of Andorra, in which the president of France and the bishop of Urgell are joint heads of state, has been suggested as a model for Gibraltar, in 2010, its then chief minister, Peter Caruana, argued that this was not a case of joint sovereignty between Spain and France, as under Andorra's 1993 Constitution, neither country exercised sovereignty over the Principality.

== United Nations ==
Gibraltar was caught unaware when the whole issue of the relationship between the territory and the UK, as well as the question of Spain was brought before the United Nations Committee on Decolonization, otherwise known as the Committee of 24, in 1963.

Resolution 2231 (XXI), which formed part of the Spanish claim, stated that "any colonial situation which partially or completely destroys the national unity and territorial integrity of a country is incompatible with the purposes and principles of the Charter of the United Nations."

Resolution 2353 (XXII) also urged the United Kingdom and Spain to overcome their differences, respecting the "interests" of the people of Gibraltar and declared the 1967 referendum to be a "contravention of the provisions of Resolution 2231.

It was supported by 73 countries (mainly Latin American, Arab, African and Eastern European countries), rejected by 19 (United Kingdom and the countries of the Commonwealth of Nations), while 27 countries abstained (Western Europe and the United States).

Since then and up to the present time, representatives of Gibraltar have regularly petitioned the UNC24 and the UNC4, although no progress has been achieved. The Committees regularly roll out their 'consensus resolution' which:

- (a) Urges both Governments, while listening to the interests and aspirations of Gibraltar, to reach, in the spirit of the statement of 27 November 1984, a definitive solution to the question of Gibraltar, in the light of relevant resolutions of the General Assembly and applicable principles, and in the spirit of the Charter of the United Nations;
- (b) Welcomes the ongoing successful implementation of the first package of measures concluded at the Tripartite Forum for Dialogue on Gibraltar.

The commitment of the British Government is not to hold the talks envisaged by the above resolution without the consent of the Gibraltarians.

The [British] Government will never – "never" is a seldom-used word in politics – enter into an agreement on sovereignty without the agreement of the Government of Gibraltar and their people. In fact, we will never even enter into a process without that agreement. The word "never" sends a substantial and clear commitment and has been used for a purpose. We have delivered that message with confidence to the peoples and the Governments of Gibraltar and Spain. It is a sign of the maturity of our relationship now that that is accepted as [Britain]'s position.

The effective stalemate has led Peter Caruana to conclude that attending future meetings of the Committee of 24 is a pointless exercise.

== Relations with Spain ==
In a referendum on 10 September 1967, the people of Gibraltar voted by 12,138 to 44 to reject the transfer of sovereignty to Spain and to remain under British sovereignty. This day is now celebrated as Gibraltar's National Day. In a referendum organised by the Government of Gibraltar on 7 November 2002, voters overwhelmingly rejected the principle that Spain and the United Kingdom should share sovereignty over Gibraltar, by 17,900 votes to 187 on a turnout of almost 88%.

Unlike most other British territories, Gibraltar has not been offered independence by the UK. It has been suggested that this is on the grounds that the Treaty of Utrecht, under which Spain ceded the territory to the British Crown, states that, if the British Crown should ever wish to dispose of Gibraltar, it must first be offered to Spain. However, the Government of Gibraltar has pointed out at the UN that Article 103 of the UN Charter overrules and annuls this "reversionary clause".

Neither the United Kingdom nor Spain seem keen to test the legal status of Article X of the Treaty of Utrecht in court. The remaining parts of the treaty that regulated such things as the slave trade, and the transfer of Menorca to the British, have become obsolete.

Spain argues that Gibraltar's status is an anachronism, and that it should become an autonomous community of Spain, similar to Catalonia or the Basque Country. It also argues that the principle of territorial integrity, not self-determination applies, drawing parallels with the British handover of Hong Kong to the People's Republic of China in 1997.

At the same time, the British government continues to state that there can be no change in the status of Gibraltar without their democratic consent .

The Gibraltarian government has asked the UN Committee of 24 to refer the issues to the International Court of Justice for an advisory opinion, but Spain has lobbied against this. The government of Gibraltar has also invited the committee to visit the territory, but so far, despite no objection from the United Kingdom, they have not done so.

The 2006 constitution further increases the level of self-government in the territory, and the colonial status of Gibraltar is now considered to be over. In a letter to the United Nations describing this, the British Foreign Secretary stated that "I do not think that this description would apply to any relationship based on colonialism."

== Pressure groups ==
In addition to the parties there are a number of pressure groups active in Gibraltar, not aligned to any political party.

=== Gibraltar Women's Association ===
The Gibraltar Women's Association was founded on 16 February 1966, by Mrs Angela Smith.

It was originally known as the Gibraltar Housewives Association, and subsequently, in the early eighties it was changed to the Gibraltar Women's Association keeping in with more modern times that not all women were solely housewives.

=== Equality Rights Group GGR ===
Launched in September 2000 by Felix Alvarez, initially named GGR (Gib Gay Rights) now has a wider human rights platform in Gibraltar and is known as Equality Rights Group GGR .

Although it still defends sexual minorities it has also been active on issues regarding the disabled, and issues regarding the protection of children against sex abuse.

=== Environmental Safety Group ===
The Environmental Safety Group (ESG) is a non-governmental organisation that was formed in 2000. It is a registered charity and works to promote environmental issues within the community. Concerns of: air and water quality, pollution, preservation of our green areas, traffic, need for renewable energy, litter/recycling and climate change have been the focus of many ESG campaigns. The group is apolitical and enjoys widespread support from the community. Its membership runs into several hundred and many others are regularly invited to support or participate in local and global environmental campaigns.

=== Gibraltar Local Disability Movement ===
The Gibraltar Local Disability Movement (GLDM) was established in 1985 to improve the lives of disabled people in Gibraltar, promote equal opportunities and tackle discrimination. The movement ceased to be active for several years during the 1990s and early 2000s, but was reactivated in 2005 to address the situation for disabled people in Gibraltar, which did not see great improvement for several years. Although the 2006 Equal Opportunities Act protects disabled people in Gibraltar from discrimination, Gibraltar remains behind the UK and other countries on issues such as disability allowances and wheelchair access to both private and government buildings. www.disability.gi

=== Voice of Gibraltar Group ===
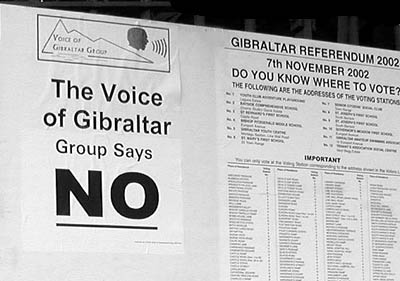
The 2002 Referendum Campaign

The Voice of Gibraltar Group was founded in 1996. In 1997 it organised a march attended by 10,000 people campaigning for Spanish recognition of Gibraltarians' rights within the EU for the support of the new British Labour Government in this matter. In 2001 it drew criticism from the Government of Gibraltar for pressuring the Select Committee of the House of Assembly to accelerate completion of its work and for introducing what the Government claimed were partisan politics into the matter of Gibraltar remaining British. The same year, in concert with the Self-Determination for Gibraltar Group, the VOGG organised a demonstration attended by an estimated 10,000 people. Joining a Government-sponsored initiative led by local musicians under the auspices of Rock on the Rock Club, a non-political organisation, the VOGG mounted protest in Neath, the constituency of Peter Hain the UK Minister for Europe. It campaigned, with others, for a "no" vote in the 2002 referendum It has been described as "Gibraltar's most-hardline protest group".

=== Integration With Britain Movement ===
The Integration With Britain Movement (IWBM) is a pressure group advocating further integration with the United Kingdom. They aim for Gibraltar to attain a state of devolved integration similar to that pertaining in Scotland, Wales & Northern Ireland. They are led by Joe Caruana and are successors to the defunct Integration With Britain Party (IWBP).

== See also ==
- Judiciary of Gibraltar
