= Peter Isola =

Gibraltarian politician (1929-2006)

The Hon. Peter Joseph Isola MHA, OBE, GMH

Leader of the Opposition
- In office 1956–1984

Deputy Chief Minister of Gibraltar
- In office 1965–1984

Personal details
- Born: 20 March 1929 Gibraltar
- Died: 28 January 2006 (aged 76–77)
- Party: Independent; Isola Group; Democratic Party for a British Gibraltar
- Education: Stonyhurst College; Pembroke College, Oxford
- Occupation: Politician, lawyer

Peter Joseph Isola, OBE, GMH (Gibraltar, 1929 – 28 January 2006 ), was a Gibraltarian politician and lawyer. He succeeded Maurice Xiberras as leader of the Democratic Party for a British Gibraltar (DPBG).

== Early life and career ==
Isola was born in Gibraltar in 1929, and was educated at Stonyhurst College, a Jesuit independent school in Lancashire, and Pembroke College, Oxford, where he read law.

Isola had an early political success in an election to the Gibraltar Legislative Council in 1956, when ten candidates contested seven seats. The winners were Joshua Hassan, Abraham Serfaty, J. E. Alcantara, and Albert Risso, all of the Association for the Advancement of Civil Rights, one Commonwealth Party candidate, Joseph Triay, and two Independents, Isola and Solomon Seruya.

He remained in the House of Assembly until 1983, and twice served as Leader of the Opposition, first as an independent, and later as leader of the DPBG.

In 1963 and 1964, he went to the United Nations together with Chief Minister Sir Joshua Hassan to oppose Spain's attempt to obtain sovereignty over Gibraltar using decolonisation as an argument to achieve its ends. Both leaders returned to a large public welcome. In 1964 Isola defended free association with the UK, which had been unanimously endorsed by the whole legislature as the constitutional formula for decolonisation, which was expected to be achieved by no later than 1969. In 1965, at the height of the Spain's offensive at the United Nations, and as Leader of the Opposition, Isola decided to enter into a coalition Government, serving as Deputy Chief Minister, with Joshua Hassan going on as Chief Minister. He was one of the members of the Constitutional Conference chaired by Lord Shepherd in 1968 which drafted the Gibraltar Constitution of 1969.

The DPBG disintegrated after it had failed to win any seats in the 1984 elections, when Isola even lost his own seat. He then retired from politics to concentrate on his substantial legal practice, heading the legal firm of Isola & Isola (now called Isolas).

He was also a member of the constitutional advisory committee.

== Honours ==
Upon the creation of the Gibraltar Medallion of Honour in 2008, Peter Isola was posthumously awarded the Medallion and was therefore recorded in the Gibraltar Roll of Honour. Isola's Triumphant Return to Gibraltar in 1963 when he and Joshua Hassan were cheered by crowds in John Mackintosh Square has been recorded in a commissioned painting by Ambrose Avellano.

== See also ==
- List of Gibraltarians
- Politics of Gibraltar
