= Integration with Britain Party =

Political party in Gibraltar (1967–1976)

- Leader: Robert Peliza; Maurice Xiberras
- Founded: 1967; 59 years ago
- Dissolved: 1976; 50 years ago
- Ideology: Workers' rights British integrationism Gibraltarian-British unionism
- Political position: Big tent

The Integration with Britain Party (IWBP) was a political party in Gibraltar. Although it never won an election, it was briefly in power from 1969 to 1972 when Robert Peliza of the IWBP was Chief Minister.

== History ==
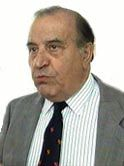
Robert Peliza, leader of the IWBP.

The party was established in February 1967 by Robert Peliza, a former member of the Association for the Advancement of Civil Rights (AACR), calling for full integration with the United Kingdom, including direct parliamentary representation in Westminster.

In the 1969 elections, the AACR emerged as the largest party with seven of the fifteen seats in the House of Assembly, with the IWBP winning five and the Isola Group of independents winning three. The AACR, led by Joshua Hassan, was unable to form a coalition government with the Isola Group, who instead supported Peliza and formed a government with him.

After Alfred Gache, a member of the Isola Group, defected to the AACR on 1 June 1972, the IWBP could no longer command a majority, and thus could not form a government. Peliza dissolved the House of Assembly and called early elections on 23 June. Although the IWBP won seven seats, it was defeated by the AACR, which obtained eight seats and 52% of the vote, while the Isola Group disbanded with both Peter and William Isola joining the IWBP. The results returned Joshua Hassan to power, leaving Peliza as Leader of the Opposition. In October 1972, Maurice Xiberras took over as party and opposition leader.

The party had two main political goals, namely achieving parity of wages between the labour force in Gibraltar and that in the United Kingdom and integrating with the United Kingdom. Although they were successful with the first of these objectives, with Gibraltar workers gaining parity of wages in July 1978, the party's main aim of union with the UK was dealt a severe blow in 1975, when Roy Hattersley, at the time a junior minister in the British Foreign Office, stated that integration was not acceptable to the British Government. Despite this, in early 1976 a cross-party Constitution Committee was established in Gibraltar to discuss and plan for constitutional changes involving the further integration of Gibraltar with the United Kingdom. Joshua Hassan and Maurice Xiberras visited London in June 1976 as delegates of the Constitution Committee, but were unable to convince the British Government to support their proposals, leading Hattersley to issue a memorandum rejecting the proposals on behalf of the Government.

As a result of the British Government's clear repudiation of their entire raison d'être, the IWBP was dissolved shortly before the 1976 elections. The AACR won eight seats (with a personal vote of 75.3% for its leader Hassan) and returned to power, although Xiberras was elected as an independent.

== Other former IWBP members ==
Another Chief Minister, Joe Bossano, began his political career in the IWBP, and was elected to the House of Assembly in 1972. However, he left the party in 1975 and formed the Gibraltar Democratic Movement after the IWBP was dissolved.

Lloyd Devincenzi Sr. was an IWBP member, who served as Minister for Education and Recreation from 1969 to 1972, and as shadow Minister from 1972 to 1976.

== Sources ==
- Jackson, William (1990). The Rock of the Gibraltarians. A History of Gibraltar (2nd ed.). Grendon, Northamptonshire, UK: Gibraltar Books. pp. 323–324. ISBN 0-948466-14-6.
