= Joshua Hassan =

Gibraltarian politician & 1st and 3rd Chief Minister and 1st Mayor of Gibraltar

The Honourable Sir Joshua Hassan GBE KCMG LVO QC JP
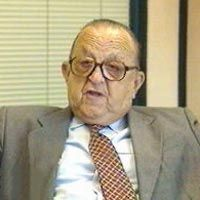

1st and 3rd Chief Minister of Gibraltar
- In office 11 August 1964 – 6 August 1969
- Monarch: Elizabeth II
- Governor: Sir Dudley Ward; Sir Gerald Lathbury; Sir Varyl Begg
- Preceded by: Position established
- Succeeded by: Sir Robert Peliza
- In office 25 June 1972 – 8 December 1987
- Monarch: Elizabeth II
- Governor: Sir Varyl Begg; Sir John Grandy; Sir William Jackson; Sir David Williams; Sir Peter Terry
- Deputy: Adolfo Canepa
- Preceded by: Sir Robert Peliza
- Succeeded by: Adolfo Canepa

1st Mayor of Gibraltar
- In office 1955–1969
- Preceded by: Position established
- Succeeded by: William Thompson

Personal details
- Born: Joshua Abraham Hassan; 21 August 1915 Gibraltar
- Died: 1 July 1997 (aged 81) Gibraltar
- Party: AACR
- Spouse(s): Daniela Salazar (m. 1945; div. 1969) Marcelle Bensimon (m. 1969)
- Children: 4 daughters, including Marlene Nahon and Fleur Hassan-Nahoum
- Profession: Lawyer

Sir Joshua Abraham Hassan (21 August 1915 – 1 July 1997), nicknamed "Salvador" (Saviour), was a Gibraltarian politician, and first mayor and Chief Minister of Gibraltar, serving four terms as chief minister for a total of over 20 years. He is seen as the key figure in the civil rights movement in Gibraltar, and played a key role in the creation of the territory's institutions of self-government.

== Early life ==
Born to a Sephardic Jewish family from Morocco and Menorca, he trained as a lawyer at Middle Temple and was called to the Bar of England and Wales in 1939. When World War II broke out, he volunteered as a gunner in the Gibraltar Defence Force and remained in Gibraltar when most of the civilian population had been evacuated and only a small number of Gibraltarians remained.

== Career ==
=== Chief minister of Gibraltar ===
In September 1942, a group of fellow Gibraltarians, clerks and workers, led by trade-unionist Albert Risso, came together to form an association advocating the return of the evacuees and the civil rights of the local inhabitants of Gibraltar. They asked Hassan to join them. Initially named "The Gibraltarian Association", upon Hassan's advice, the group took a much more ambitious name: The Association for the Advancement of Civil Rights in Gibraltar (AACR). Hassan was the vice-president of the party under the leadership of Risso. In 1948, Hassan succeeded him as president and was the leader of the AACR and the dominant figure in the politics of the territory for almost forty years.

In an election to the Gibraltar Legislative Council held on 19 September 1956, four of the seven winning candidates were from the AACR, Hassan, Abraham Serfaty, Albert Risso, and J. E. Alcantara.

Further terms in office lasted from 11 August 1964 to 6 August 1969, and from 25 June 1972 to 8 December 1987. During the 1960s, Hassan addressed the United Nations Special Committee on Decolonization twice, opposing Spain's claim for Gibraltar and insisting that the vast majority of Gibraltarians wanted to remain British. He was one of the members of the 1968 Constitutional Conference chaired by Malcolm Shepherd, 2nd Baron Shepherd, which drafted the Gibraltar's first Constitution. Hassan only lost one election, the 1969 election, when the AACR failed to win a majority by just one seat, as it only obtained seven of the fifteen seats of the House. The Integration with Britain Party (IWBP, supporter of the integration of Gibraltar into the United Kingdom) gained support from the independent members of the House of Assembly and its leader Robert Peliza became Chief Minister and remained so for three years. Hassan was returned to office in 1972. He resigned without completing his term as Chief Minister in 1987 after an agreement on the shared use of Gibraltar Airport was signed by Spain and the United Kingdom, citing personal reasons. He was succeeded by the then Deputy Chief Minister, Adolfo Canepa. However, Canepa lost the 1988 election to Joe Bossano of the Gibraltar Socialist Labour Party (GSLP) and the AACR disbanded shortly afterwards. Bossano was one of Hassan's main critics, accusing him of being too conciliatory towards the British Government.

=== Mayor of Gibraltar ===
Before the creation of the post of chief minister in 1964, Hassan had served as a member of the Executive Council (1950–64), as mayor of Gibraltar (1945–1950, 1953–1969; until 1955 the name of the title was chair of the City Council), and as the chief member of the Legislative Council (1950–64).

He was knighted by Queen Elizabeth II in 1963 and was therefore styled "Sir" since then. Hassan's Triumphant Return to Gibraltar in 1963 when he and Peter Isola were cheered by crowds in John Mackintosh Square has been recorded in a commissioned painting by Ambrose Avellano.

=== Lawyer ===
Hassan was also a successful lawyer and his chambers, Hassans International Law Firm, is now the largest in Gibraltar.

== Personal life ==
In 1945 Hassan married Daniela Salazar, a Spanish national, with whom he had two daughters before divorcing in 1969. In 1969, he married Marcelle Bensimon, a Moroccan Jew, with whom he had two daughters: Fleur Hassan-Nahoum, an Israeli politician who has served on the Jerusalem City Council and as the city's deputy mayor; and Marlene Hassan-Nahon, a Gibraltarian historian, journalist, and former politician who served in the Gibraltar Parliament and founded and led Together Gibraltar from 2015 to 2023.

Sir Joshua died in his sleep at the age of 81 on 1 July 1997 at Old St. Bernard's Hospital, after having been admitted the previous day complaining of back pain. According to Peter Caruana, Chief Minister of Gibraltar at the time of Hassan's death:

"No one has done more to establish and promote the identity and maintain the rights of the people of Gibraltar."

In 1997, a special stamp was issued by the Gibraltar Philatelic Bureau to pay tribute to Sir Joshua Hassan.

In July 2026, the Government of Gibraltar renamed Gibraltar International Airport to Joshua Hassan Gibraltar International Airport.

Civic offices
New creation	Mayor of Gibraltar; 1955–1969	Succeeded by William Thompson
Political offices
New creation	Chief Minister of Gibraltar; 1964–1969	Succeeded by Robert Peliza
Preceded by Robert Peliza	Chief Minister of Gibraltar; 1972–1987	Succeeded by Adolfo Canepa

== See also ==
- List of Gibraltarians
- Politics of Gibraltar
