= Association for the Advancement of Civil Rights =

- Leader: Albert Risso; Joshua Hassan; Adolfo Canepa
- Founded: 1942; 84 years ago
- Dissolved: 1991; 35 years ago
- Ideology: Civil rights Liberalism; Civic nationalism Populism
- Political position: Centre-right

The Association for the Advancement of Civil Rights (AACR) was a political party in Gibraltar.

== History ==
The AACR was established in 1942 by Joshua Hassan and Albert Risso, and sought to protect the interests of families evacuated during World War II. At the time, most of the Gibraltar population had been evacuated and only a small number of Gibraltarians remained on The Rock. Consequently, the colony was crowded with British soldiers, sailors and airmen. They received wide support from the Governor, General Mason-MacFarlane (later a Labour MP in the United Kingdom), who allowed them to fulfil the representative role that the Committee of the Exchange and the Commercial Library used to fill. The Governor also left the AACR with the responsibility of managing the leave scheme that allowed the Gibraltarians who remained on the Rock to visit their families in Britain. They also took a leading role in the repatriation of the Gibraltarian evacuees.

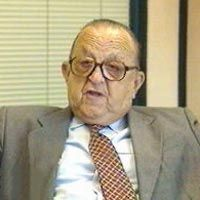
Joshua Hassan, longest running leader of the AACR and Chief Minister of Gibraltar for 18 years.

In 1945 the AACR became a political party, advocating improved pay and working conditions and the introduction of a democratic constitution. In August 1945, the first City Council elections since the war were held and the AACR won all the elected seats in the Council, with Hassan became its chairman. In the first elections to the new legislature in 1950, it won three of the five seats and was able to form a government. The party won successive elections in 1953 and 1956. The 1959 elections saw it win only three of the seven seats, but with the other four held by independents, it was able to continue in government. This was repeated after the 1964 elections, but the results of the 1969 elections (when it added "Gibraltar Labour Party" to its name) saw two new parties, the Integration with Britain Party and Isola Group win eight of the 15 seats between them, allowing them to form a government.

After a member of the Isola Group defected in 1972, early elections were called, which saw the AACR win eight of the 15 seats and return to government. The party won subsequent elections in 1976 and 1980.

After victory in the 1984 elections Hassan resigned without completing his term as Chief Minister in 1987 after an agreement on the shared use of Gibraltar Airport was signed by Spain and the United Kingdom, citing personal reasons. He was succeeded by the then Deputy Chief Minister, Adolfo Canepa. However, Canepa lost the 1988 election to Joe Bossano of the Gibraltar Socialist Labour Party (GSLP), winning only seven seats and forming the opposition in 1988. In 1992 they failed to return to power and were effectively dissolved thereafter. The last election with an AACR candidate was the 1998 by-election following the death of Robert Mor of the GSLP. The AACR candidate John Piris received only 337 votes and was defeated by Joseph Garcia of the Liberal Party of Gibraltar (LPG), backed by the GSLP.

== Ideology ==
Until the 1960s the party was linked with the Gibraltar Confederation of Labour, which it had founded. However, the links with unions began to weaken thereafter. The party had a pragmatic and progressive policy platform, and aimed to strengthen relations with Britain, but also give the territory freedom. This was reflected in its campaign slogan "With Britain, but not under Britain".

Like all other major Gibraltar political parties, it opposed transfer of sovereignty over Gibraltar from the United Kingdom to Spain.

== Gibraltar Award ==
On 10 December 2007 the Self Determination for Gibraltar Group awarded the founding fathers of the AACR with the Gibraltar Award in recognition of their contribution to the political development, democratisation and emancipation of Gibraltar. The award was presented to Adolfo Canepa, the last AACR Chief Minister to hold office, in John Mackintosh Square on the 59th anniversary of the Universal Declaration of Human Rights.
