= Joe Bossano =

Gibraltarian politician, former Chief Minister (1988–1996), Minister for Economy

The Honourable Sir Joseph Bossano KCMG MP
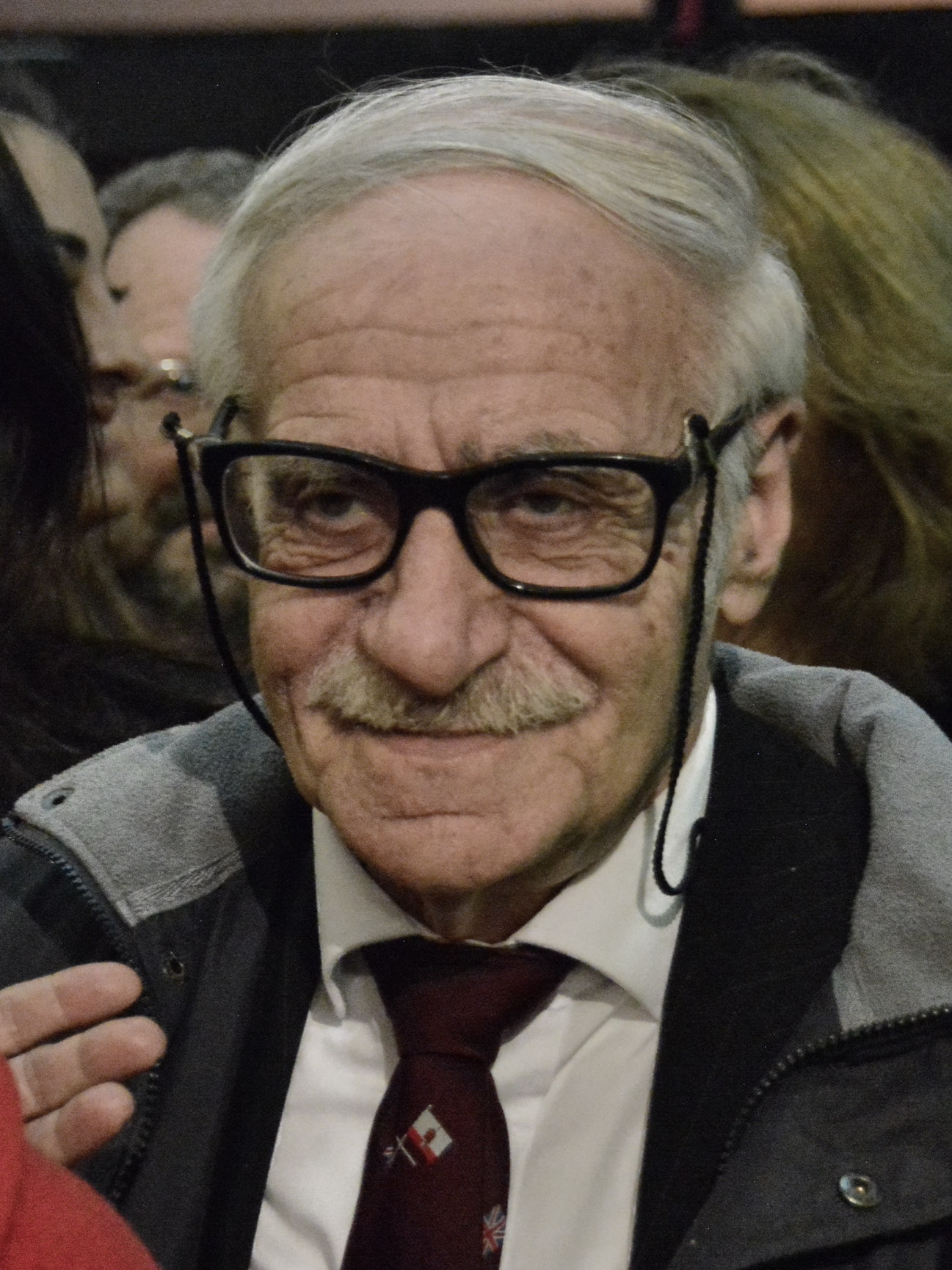
- Bossano in 2016

Minister for Economic Development, Enterprise, Telecommunications & the Gibraltar Savings Bank
- Incumbent
- Assumed office 9 December 2011
- Chief Minister: Fabian Picardo

Leader of the Opposition
- In office 17 May 1996 – 20 April 2011
- Monarch: Elizabeth II
- Chief Minister: Peter Caruana
- Preceded by: Peter Caruana
- Succeeded by: Fabian Picardo

Chief Minister of Gibraltar
- In office 25 March 1988 – 17 May 1996
- Monarch: Elizabeth II
- Preceded by: Adolfo Canepa
- Succeeded by: Peter Caruana

Personal details
- Born: 10 June 1939 (age 87) Gibraltar
- Party: GSLP (since 1977)
- Other political affiliations: IWBP (1972-1975); DPBG (1975-1977)
- Spouse: Rose Marie
- Children: 4
- Education: University of Birmingham London School of Economics
- Awards: KCMG (2018)

Sir Joseph John Bossano (born 10 June 1939) is a Gibraltarian politician who served as Chief Minister of Gibraltar from 1988 to 1996 and Leader of the Gibraltar Socialist Labour Party from 1978 to 2011. He served as Leader of the Opposition from 1984 to 1988 and 1996 to 2011. He was first elected to the then Gibraltar House of Assembly in 1972 and is often referred to as the Father of the House for being the longest-serving parliamentarian in Gibraltar.

== Early life and career ==
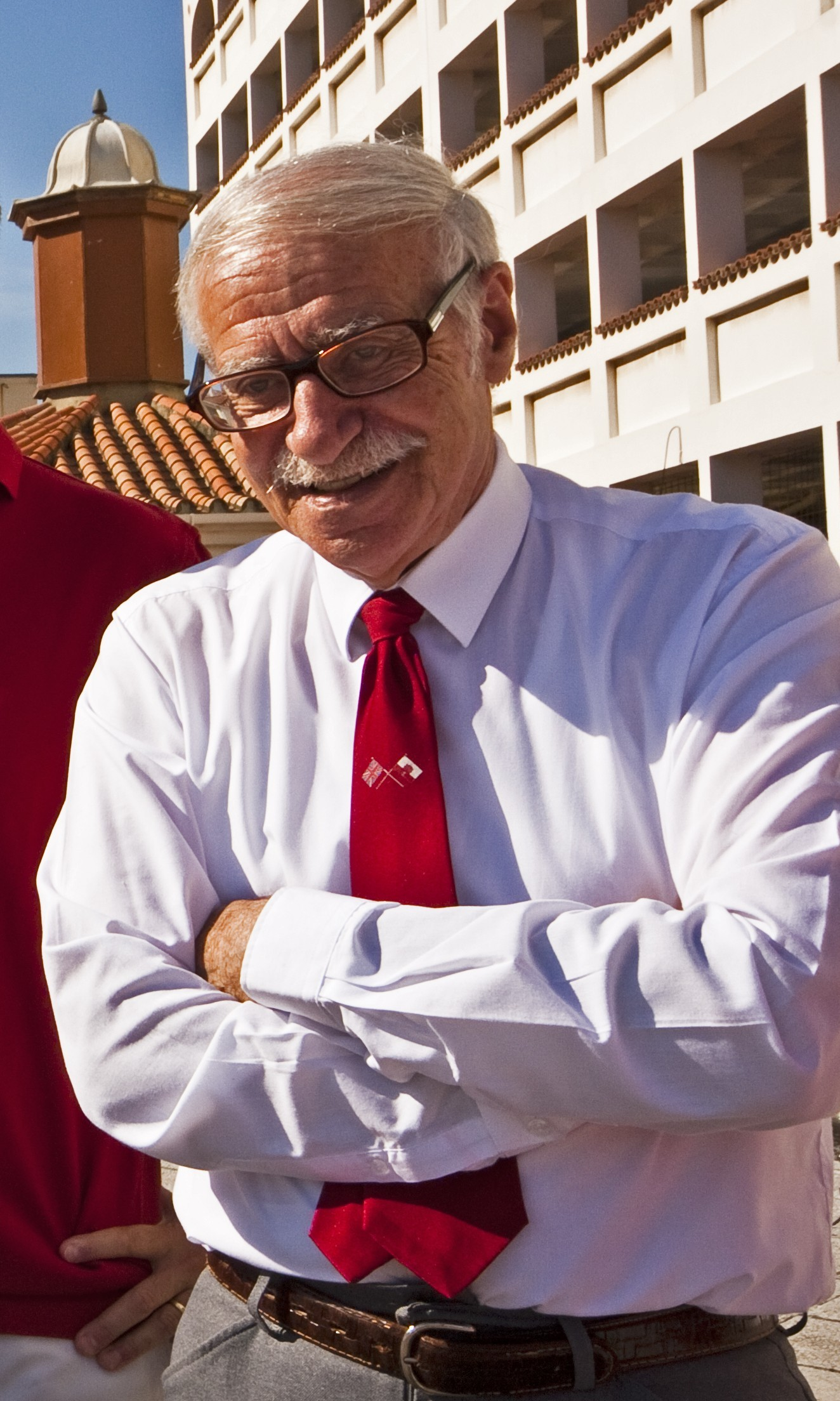
Joe Bossano at the 2011 Gibraltar National Day political rally at Grand Casemates Square

Bossano was born in Gibraltar and has a degree in Economics from the London School of Economics, as well as a degree in Italian from the University of Birmingham. He became part of the trade union movement in the 1960s while working as a seaman in Britain, where he was a member of the British Labour Party.

Bossano was asked by a group of Gibraltarian politicians to return to Gibraltar and was elected a member of the House of Assembly in 1972, as a candidate of the Integration with Britain Party (IWBP). In 1969, the IWBP leader, then the Chief Minister, Sir Robert Peliza, was the mover of the Preamble to the Constitution which safeguards Gibraltar from ever passing to Spain without the expressed wishes of the Gibraltarians. He became the Branch Officer for the Transport and General Workers Union (responsible for the public sector in Gibraltar and was the main force behind the attainment of parity of wages with the UK for Gibraltarians).

In 1975, he left the IWBP to form the Gibraltar Democratic Movement, which won four seats in the Assembly in the 1976 election and two years later became the Gibraltar Socialist Labour Party.

Bossano consistently maintained a hard-line stance against any sovereignty deal with Spain without the consent of the Gibraltarians. In 1980, he led a demonstrations of about 2,000 Gibraltarians protesting at the opening of negotiations between Spain and the United Kingdom agreed on the Lisbon Agreement.

In 1987, he supported the position of the Government of Gibraltar and the Assembly against any agreement between Spain and the United Kingdom with regard to the joint use of the Airport of Gibraltar. On 10 November, Bossano and Joshua Hassan, then Chief Minister, led a demonstration of about 12,000 Gibraltarians, one of the largest ever held in the territory.

In February 1988, Bossano and Adolfo Canepa, the leader of the Association for the Advancement of Civil Rights, stated that the Gibraltar House of Assembly would not approve the agreement reached by Spain and UK in December 1987 on the joint use of the Airport unless Spain accepted the British sovereignty over the isthmus.

In the key 1988 election, Bossano's party called for the self-determination, expressed its opposition to the negotiations over the sovereignty and future of Gibraltar between Spain and the United Kingdom, and opposed to any transfer of sovereignty to Spain. It also asked for the withdrawal of the negotiations on the Brussels Declaration and opposed to the Airport agreement. The GSLP got 8 seats and a 58.2% of the popular vote. Bossano received a personal vote of 8,1128, about 4,000 more than his contender, Adolfo Canepa. Thus, Bossano was the new Chief Minister.

His re-election in 1992 with a 72% share of the vote (using the campaign slogan "Give Spain No Hope"), caused considerable friction with governments in both London and Madrid who were looking for a solution to the 30-year-old Spanish claim to Gibraltar. As Chief Minister he maintained good relations with Spanish politicians at municipal level, but would not sit to discuss the sovereignty of Gibraltar with them. During his time in office, Bossano also oversaw significant economic change, resulting from the decline of traditional sources of employment, such as the UK Ministry of Defence, and the creation of a private sector economy based on offshore finance and tourism.

Bossano helped resolve the severe housing problem existing in Gibraltar before he came into power, by reclaiming land from the sea and constructing hundreds of affordable flats, which were offered at very reasonable prices. For the first time, and since then, Gibraltarians have become home owners, rather than renting from the government, as was traditional.

His main quest is and has always been to achieve the decolonisation of Gibraltar through the maximum level of self-government possible resulting in the removal of Gibraltar from the United Nations list of non-self-governing territories.

As leader of the GSLP and the Opposition and following his retirement as party leader, Bossano is still prominent in Gibraltar politics. He stood down as GSLP leader in April 2011, replaced by Fabian Picardo. Bossano remains active in politics and was a GSLP candidate in the Gibraltar general election in December 2011. Upon the GSLP-Liberal victory, Bossano got a seat in the Gibraltar Parliament and was appointed Minister for Enterprise, Training and Employment by the Chief Minister, Fabian Picardo.

The GSLP-Liberal government under Fabian Picardo won a second term at the 2015 general election and as of 2017, Bossano held the position of Minister for Economic Development, Telecommunications & the Gibraltar Savings Bank.

== Awards ==
Bossano was appointed a Knight Commander of the Most Distinguished Order of Saint Michael and Saint George (KCMG) by Her Majesty Queen Elizabeth II in the 2018 New Year Honours.

Political offices
Preceded by	Member of Parliament; 2011–present	Succeeded by
Preceded by Party founded	Leader of the Gibraltar Socialist Labour Party; 1978–2011	Succeeded by Fabian Picardo
Preceded by Adolfo Canepa	Chief Minister of Gibraltar; 1988–1996	Succeeded by Peter Caruana

== Controversy ==
=== Comments against Moroccans ===
In 1992-1993, when serving as Chief Minister, he told local media that if international law states that a Moroccan man, with his "4 wives and 10 kids", are required to enter Gibraltar easily, he responded saying that he and his family would not come. Later at the UN, he stated that he would still disobey international laws on immigration.

These comments offended the local Moroccan community, whom they said they don't know anyone in Gibraltar with such a large family as quoted by him. The Moroccans were pivotal for Gibraltar for some time since they replaced the Spanish workers lost when the border closed in 1969 and the vast majority were still living and working in squalid, inhumane conditions 30 years on. This sparked a community protest against racism. The whole incidents was later brought up again on social media at the 2023 General Elections (to which Sir Joe was contesting for reelection as Economic Minister).

=== Comments about Disability ===
On 31 July 2023, on the 'Today Gibraltar' section on GBC's Radio Gibraltar, he had an interview where he, in regards to Supported Employment for the Disabled, he expressed the process as 'Protected' Employment and that disabled employees might not be as engaged and productive on the workplace as normal people and that they might need more sick leave than others.

This sparked negative reactions from the Disability Society and SNAG (Special Needs Action Group), who they described the comments as 'bordering on insult' and 'promoting Ableism'. On the next day on the same section, he was asked whether he would apologize to the people he may have offended, to which his response was that he will stand with his comments and not apologise.

== See also ==
- List of Gibraltarians
- Politics of Gibraltar
