= Robert Peliza =

Chief Minister of Gibraltar (1920–2011)

The Honourable Sir Bob Peliza KBE ED GMH
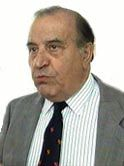

2nd Chief Minister of Gibraltar
- In office 6 August 1969 – 25 June 1972
- Monarch: Elizabeth II
- Governor: Sir Varyl Begg
- Preceded by: Sir Joshua Hassan
- Succeeded by: Sir Joshua Hassan

Personal details
- Born: 16 November 1920 Gibraltar
- Died: 12 December 2011 (aged 91) Gibraltar
- Party: Integration with Britain Party
- Spouse: Lady Irma Peliza
- Children: 7

Sir Robert John Peliza KBE GMH ED (16 November 1920 – 12 December 2011) was a Gibraltarian politician.

== Career ==
He founded and led the Integration with Britain Party and was the second Chief Minister of Gibraltar serving in office from 6 August 1969 to 25 June 1972. He was one of the members of the Constitutional Conference chaired by Malcolm Shepherd, 2nd Baron Shepherd in 1968 that drafted Gibraltar's first Constitution. Peliza was also Speaker of the Gibraltar House of Assembly from 1992 to 1996 and Honorary Colonel of the Royal Gibraltar Regiment from 1993 to 1999.

Peliza died on 12 December 2011 at St Bernard's Hospital in Gibraltar at the age of 91.

== See also ==
- List of Gibraltarians
- Politics of Gibraltar

Political offices
Preceded by Joshua Hassan	Chief Minister of Gibraltar; 1969–1972	Succeeded by Joshua Hassan
