= 1953 Gibraltar general election =

Second elections to the Gibraltar Legislative Council

- 16 September 1953
- All 5 elective seats in the Legislative Council (Note: The other six seats on the eleven-member Council were not elected: the Governor sat as President, three members served ex officio (the Colonial Secretary, the Attorney-General and the Financial Secretary), and two were nominated by the Governor.)
- Turnout: 55.67%
Party	Leader	Seats	+/–
AACR	Joshua Hassan	3	0
Independents	–	2	0
This lists parties that won seats. See the complete results below.

General elections were held in Gibraltar on 16 September 1953 to elect five members of the Legislative Council, the second elections since the establishment of the Council, the first having been held three years earlier in 1950. Seven candidates contested the five elective seats. The Association for the Advancement of Civil Rights (AACR), led by Joshua Hassan, remained the largest party in the legislature, winning three of the five elected seats, with the remaining two taken by independents. Voter turnout was 56%.

== Background ==
The Legislative Council had been created in 1950 as Gibraltar's first partly elected legislature, and the first elections to it were held that November. It did not replace the City Council, which continued to administer municipal affairs; the two bodies ran in parallel. Elected members retained their seats until the dissolution of the Council, which took place at least every three years, and a second general election fell due in 1953. General Sir Kenneth Anderson left Gibraltar in March 1953 and was succeeded as Governor in May by General Sir Gordon MacMillan, who presided over the Council as its President.

== Electoral system ==
The elections were regulated by the Elections Ordinance, 1950 (No. 15 of 1950). The five elected seats were filled by proportional representation using the single transferable vote. The franchise was exercisable by all adult British subjects and citizens of the Republic of Ireland who had been ordinarily resident in Gibraltar for a continuous period of twelve months ending on the qualifying date, with provision for electors who had spent part or all of that period in neighbouring Spanish territory; members of the Armed Forces not domiciled in Gibraltar were excluded. The proportional system was not applied to elections for the City Council.

== Campaign ==
In the run-up to the poll the Gibraltar Confederation of Labour (GCL), the territory's largest trade union, renewed its attacks on proportional representation in a manifesto published in May 1953, again demanding a legislature with an elected majority.

The AACR put forward only three candidates for the five seats: its president Joshua Hassan, the GCL president Albert Risso, and Abraham Serfaty, who was standing for the legislature a second time after failing to win a seat in 1950. Distrusting proportional representation, the party chose to concentrate its supporters' votes on three names rather than spread them across four or five, a dilution it believed had cost Serfaty a seat in 1950. Four independents, among them Albert Isola and Sergio Triay, completed the field of seven. The AACR's stated aims were a wholly elected Legislative Council and, in the shorter term, the abolition of the nominated unofficial members and of proportional representation.

== Results ==
The AACR won three of the five seats and independents the other two, leaving the party standings unchanged from 1950. Hassan comfortably headed the poll, ahead of the independents Isola and Triay, and his first place made him the Senior Elected Member of the new Council.

Party	Votes	%	Seats	+/–
Association for the Advancement of Civil Rights			3	0
Independents			2	0
Total			5	0
Total votes	7,276	–		
Registered voters/turnout	13,071	55.67		
Source: Garcia, Colonial Office, Finlayson

=== By candidate ===
The candidates are listed in order of finishing. An asterisk (*) marks members re-elected from the 1950 Council.

#	Candidate	Party
1	J. A. Hassan*	Association for the Advancement of Civil Rights
2	A. R. Isola*	Independent
3	S. P. Triay	Independent
4	A. Risso*	Association for the Advancement of Civil Rights
5	A. Serfaty	Association for the Advancement of Civil Rights
Two other independents also stood but were not returned.

== Aftermath ==
Alongside the elected members, the Legislative Council was presided over by the Governor, General Sir Gordon MacMillan. Its three ex officio members were the Colonial Secretary, J. D. Bates; the Attorney-General, D. W. Conroy; and the Financial Secretary, J. Hayward. Two further members, H. J. Coelho and G. Perryman, were nominated by the Governor, and E. H. Davis served as Clerk of the Council. The Executive Council appointments were announced on 26 September 1953. Hassan and Triay were among the members appointed, Triay taking a seat after Isola declined the post.

A separate election for the seven elective seats on the City Council followed on 2 December 1953. The AACR fielded five candidates, headed by Hassan, against four independents, and each elector was allotted four votes; the authorities had refused the party's request that electors be given one vote for each of the seven seats. The AACR won five seats and independents two, Hassan again heading the poll, with 6,530 people voting, a turnout of about 50% compared with 35% at the equivalent poll in 1950. (Note: The Gibraltar Parliament publishes this result under the heading "Legislative Council Election" and dated Tuesday 17 November 1953, but the figures are those of the City Council poll: nine candidates for seven seats, with five members of the AACR and two independents returned. Hassan headed the poll with 3,333 votes, and the independent P. G. Russo took the final seat by seven votes from A. J. Vasquez, 2,468 to 2,461, matching Garcia's account of the December 1953 municipal election.)

=== By-elections ===
Two by-elections were held during the life of the Council elected in 1953.

==== 1954 by-election ====
Sergio Triay, one of the two independents elected in 1953, resigned from the Executive Council in May 1954, holding that membership of it was incompatible with his seat in the legislature, and died on 30 July 1954 after a heart attack at a sitting of the Council. A by-election for the vacant seat was held on 5 October 1954 under proportional representation, on a turnout of 44%. Three candidates stood: Juan José Triay, the late member's son, as an independent; John Alcantara for the AACR; and Solomon Seruya, an independent recently expelled from the AACR. Seruya was eliminated after the first count with 314 first preferences, well behind Alcantara's 2,642 and Triay's 2,538; on the transfer of Seruya's second preferences Alcantara held his lead and took the seat for the AACR by 57 votes, giving the party four of the five elective seats. The narrow defeat prompted Triay to found the Gibraltar Commonwealth Party, the AACR's first organised opponent.

==== 1955 by-election ====
In 1955 a constitutional dispute arose after the Governor, General Sir Harold Redman, used his reserve powers to enact a 10% import duty that the Legislative Council had rejected. On 30 September 1955 all five elected members resigned their seats in protest, Hassan and Serfaty also resigning from the Executive Council, arguing that the Governor had imposed taxation against the wishes of the people. The Secretary of State for the Colonies, Alan Lennox-Boyd, visited Gibraltar in October to seek a settlement. A by-election to fill the five vacant seats was called for 6 December 1955, but no poll proved necessary and the five members who had resigned were returned unopposed. The dispute led to a reduction of the disputed duty and to constitutional changes drawn largely from AACR proposals.
