= 1956 Gibraltar general election =

Third elections to the Gibraltar Legislative Council

- 19 September 1956
- All 7 elective seats in the Legislative Council (Note: The other six seats on the thirteen-member Council were not elected: the Governor sat as President, three members served ex officio (the Colonial Secretary, the Attorney-General and the Financial Secretary), and two were nominated by the Governor.)
- Turnout: 58.20%
Party	Leader	Vote %	Seats	+/–
AACR	Joshua Hassan	48.11	4	+1
Commonwealth	Juan José Triay	18.58	1	New
Independents	–	33.31	2	0
This lists parties that won seats. See the complete results below.

General elections were held in Gibraltar on 19 September 1956 (Note: Polling took place on 19 September 1956, the date given by the 1956 Colonial Report, Garcia and Finlayson. The Gibraltar Parliament's return of the poll is headed Friday 21 September 1956, the day on which the count was completed and the result declared.) to elect seven members of the Legislative Council, the third elections since the establishment of the Council and the first held with a majority of elected members, following the increase in the number of elective seats from five to seven. Ten candidates contested the seven elective seats on a turnout of 58%. The Association for the Advancement of Civil Rights (AACR), led by Joshua Hassan, remained the largest party in the legislature, winning four of the seven elected seats; the newly formed Commonwealth Party took one seat and independents the other two.

== Background ==
In the 1955 constitutional crisis, the Governor, General Sir Harold Redman, had used his reserve powers to enact an import duty the elected members had rejected, prompting their resignation and unopposed return. In its aftermath the British government agreed to give the legislature a majority of elected members. On 27 July 1956, a year to the day after Redman had used those powers, he announced to the Council, at the same time as Alan Lennox-Boyd made the announcement in Parliament, that the elective seats would be increased from five to seven, that a Speaker would be appointed once a suitable person was found, that a fourth unofficial member would be added to the Executive Council, and that the number of nominated members of the City Council would be reduced. The changes were made by the Gibraltar (Legislative Council) Order in Council, 1956, and took effect before the election, which was the first held with an elected majority; the elected members were to assist in framing legislation but would not form the government.

== Electoral system ==
The elections were regulated by the Elections Ordinance 1950. The seven elective seats were filled by proportional representation using the single transferable vote, the number of elected seats having been raised from five to seven. The franchise was exercisable by all adult British subjects and citizens of the Republic of Ireland who had been ordinarily resident in Gibraltar for a continuous period of twelve months ending on the qualifying date, with provision for electors who had spent part or all of that period in neighbouring Spanish territory; members of the Armed Forces not domiciled in Gibraltar were excluded. The proportional system was not applied to elections for the City Council. With 7,370 valid votes cast for seven seats, the quota for election was 922.

== Campaign ==
The AACR nominated four candidates, the Commonwealth Party three and three others stood as independents. The AACR's manifesto called for improvements to social, medical and educational services and for further constitutional progress, reaffirming the movement's founding motto that "Gibraltar should be governed by the Gibraltarians" and reserving the right to press for a more democratic constitution. The Commonwealth Party, contesting a general election for the first time under Juan José Triay, presented itself as representing a significant section of the community, accused the AACR of fostering class hatred, and likewise called for better social services. Triay had earlier stood at the 1954 by-election as an independent and a son of the late member S. P. Triay, but was not elected.

== Results ==
The AACR won four of the seven seats, a gain of one on 1953, with Hassan again heading the poll; the Commonwealth Party's Juan José Triay was its only candidate elected, and two independents took the remaining seats. The independent Albert R. Isola, who had headed the poll at the first election in 1950 and been re-elected in 1953, lost his seat, while his son Peter Isola was returned for the first time. Of an electorate of about 13,000, some 7,669 ballots were cast, about 7,300 of them valid, a turnout of 58%; (Note: The 1956 Colonial Report gives the turnout as about 56 per cent, reckoning the roughly 7,300 valid votes against the electorate rather than all 7,669 ballots cast.) 299 ballots were rejected, most of them marked with four crosses for the AACR candidates through confusion with the City Council's voting system.

Party	First preferences	%	Seats	+/–
Association for the Advancement of Civil Rights	3,546	48.11	4	+1
Commonwealth Party	1,369	18.58	1	New
Independents	2,455	33.31	2	0
Total	7,370	100.00	7	+2
Valid votes	7,370	96.10		
Invalid/blank votes	299	3.90		
Total votes	7,669	100.00		
Registered voters/turnout	13,177	58.20		
Source: Garcia, Parliament, Finlayson

=== By candidate ===
The distribution of votes under the single transferable vote is shown below; the quota for election was 922. The seven successful candidates are numbered in their order of election, and incumbent members of the outgoing Council are marked with an asterisk (*). The second to sixth counts distributed the surpluses of Hassan, Seruya, Triay, Risso and Serfaty respectively, and the seventh distributed the votes of the two excluded candidates, Peire and Vasquez. (Note: The official return heads the seventh count "Transfer of Vasquez's surplus", but it distributes the votes of both Peire and Vasquez, the two lowest-placed candidates, neither of whom had reached the quota.)

Candidate	Party	First preferences		Subsequent counts					
Candidate	Party	First preferences		2	3	4	5	6	7
J. A. Hassan* (1)	AACR	3,281	44.52	922	922	922	922	922	922
S. A. Seruya (2)	Independent	1,482	20.11	1,482	922	922	922	922	922
J. J. Triay (3)	Commonwealth Party	1,264	17.15	1,264	1,264	922	922	922	922
A. J. Risso* (4)	AACR	75	1.02	2,169	2,169	2,169	922	922	922
A. W. Serfaty* (5)	AACR	54	0.73	138	265	270	1,426	922	922
P. J. Isola (6)	Independent	671	9.10	701	844	866	871	874	982
J. E. Alcantara* (7)	AACR	136	1.85	201	265	271	342	837	876
A. R. Isola*	Independent	302	4.10	372	504	520	526	529	621
A. Vasquez	Commonwealth Party	83	1.13	90	169	452	459	462	0
E. Peire	Commonwealth Party	22	0.30	31	46	56	58	58	0
Non-transferable votes			–	0	0	0	0	0	281
Total		7,370	100.00	7,370	7,370	7,370	7,370	7,370	7,370
Valid votes		7,370	96.10						
Invalid votes		299	3.90						
Total votes		7,669	100.00						
Registered voters/turnout		13,177	58.20						
Source: Parliament of Gibraltar, Garcia, Finlayson

== Aftermath ==
Besides the seven elected members, the Legislative Council was presided over by the Governor, General Sir Harold Redman. Its three ex officio members were the Colonial Secretary, J. D. Bates; the Attorney-General, W. G. Bryce; and the Financial Secretary, J. Hayward. Two further members, P. G. Russo and Captain J. M. E. Gareze, were nominated by the Governor, and E. H. Davis served as Clerk of the Council. Provision had been made for a Speaker, but none was appointed during the life of the Council.

The Executive Council nominations were announced on 12 October 1956; all four appointees were elected members of the Council, the AACR, which had hoped for two places, receiving one.

A separate election for the seven elective seats on the City Council followed on 5 December 1956, the municipality having been reduced from thirteen to eleven members; each elector had four votes. The AACR again won five seats, Hassan once more heading the poll; one Commonwealth Party candidate, Guy Stagnetto, was returned, keeping out his colleague Louis Bruzon by 22 votes, and the independent William Isola, brother of Peter, took a seat. Some 5,300 electors voted, a turnout of about 40%, down from the 1953 municipal poll.

=== By-elections ===
Two seats fell vacant in 1957. Juan José Triay resigned from the Executive and Legislative councils on 22 March 1957 in protest at the other elected members' silence over Spanish restrictions on movement across the frontier; he and his brother then left the Commonwealth Party, whose presidency passed to Alfred Vasquez. Shortly afterwards John Alcantara of the AACR resigned on his appointment as Registrar of the Supreme Court. At the by-election for the two seats on 29 May 1957, three candidates stood: Aurelius Montegriffo for the AACR, Alfred Vasquez for the Commonwealth Party and Ernest Russo as an independent. On a turnout of 29%, Montegriffo was elected with 1,821 first-preference votes and Russo took the second seat on transfers with 1,473, while Vasquez failed with 992. The result left the Commonwealth Party without a seat in the legislature; Vasquez resigned its presidency on 14 June 1957 and the party effectively dissolved.
