= 1954 Gibraltar by-election =

By-election in Gibraltar following the death of an elected member

- October 1954

One of the five elective seats on the Legislative Council
	First party	Second party	Third party
Candidate	John Alcantara	J. J. Triay	S. A. Seruya
Leader	Joshua Hassan
Party	AACR	Independent	Independent
Leader since	1948
Member before election
S. P. Triay
Independent
Elected Member
John Alcantara
AACR

A by-election to the Legislative Council was held in Gibraltar in October 1954, following the death of S. P. Triay, one of the five elected members, who had sat as an independent. (Note: The Colonial Report and Finlayson both give the month as October 1954 but do not record an exact date; nor do the available sources record the voting figures.) The seat was won by John Alcantara of the Association for the Advancement of Civil Rights (AACR) in a three-cornered contest, taking the party from three of the five elected seats to four.

== Background ==
The Legislative Council had been created in 1950 to replace the City Council as Gibraltar's principal representative body, with five members elected for three-year terms alongside a number of official and nominated members. At the general election of September 1953, the second to the council, the AACR led by Joshua Hassan took three of the five elected seats, Hassan topping the poll ahead of the independent Albert R. Isola; the two remaining seats went to Isola and to another independent, S. P. Triay, with the AACR members Albert Risso and Abraham Serfaty also returned. (Note: Finlayson and the Colonial Report give the late member's name as S. P. Triay; the 1953 Gibraltar general election article renders it Sergio Triay. He was the barrister S. P. Triay QC.) The seat fell vacant on Triay's sudden death in October 1954.

== Electoral system ==
One of the council's five elected seats was to be filled for the remainder of the term. At contested elections the seats were filled by single transferable vote, though with a single vacancy the contest was in effect a straight choice among the candidates.

== Candidates ==
Three candidates came forward for the vacant seat: John Alcantara of the AACR; J. J. Triay, an independent and a son of the late member; and S. A. Seruya, later the independent member Solomon Seruya. (Note: Finlayson names the son who stood as J. J. Triay, identifiable with Juan Jose Triay, later leader of the Gibraltar Commonwealth Party; some sources instead associate S. P. Triay's son with the barrister and politician Joseph (J. E.) Triay. S. A. Seruya is identifiable with Solomon Abraham Seruya (1926–2015), who was returned as an independent at the 1956, 1959 and 1964 general elections, although Finlayson does not state his affiliation at this by-election.)

== Result ==
Alcantara won the seat, giving the AACR four of the five elective places on the council alongside the sole remaining independent, Albert R. Isola. The Colonial Report for 1954–1955 recorded that the seat had been gained by an AACR member who already sat among the party's three, and Finlayson likewise noted that the result carried the party to four of the five elected seats. Contemporary sources do not record the number of votes cast for each candidate.

== Aftermath ==
In the wake of the by-election a new political party, the Gibraltar Commonwealth Party, made its appearance. (Note: Both the Colonial Report and Finlayson place the party's emergence immediately after the October 1954 by-election; other sources date its foundation to 1953 or to 1956.) Although J. J. Triay had failed to win the vacant seat, he went on to lead the new party and stood again at the 1956 general election, at which he was returned as its only successful candidate.

The four-to-one AACR majority among the elected members established by the by-election was the composition of the elected benches during the 1955 Gibraltar constitutional crisis, when all five elected members resigned in protest at the Governor's use of his reserve powers and were subsequently returned unopposed at a by-election in December 1955. The five elected seats were next contested at the general election of September 1956, at which the number of elected seats was expanded from five to seven.
