= 1924 Gibraltar City Council election =

Second municipal election in Gibraltar

- 1 December 1924

All 4 elective seats on the City Council of Gibraltar (Note: The council had nine members in total: the four elected councillors plus five non-elective members, comprising three nominated by the Governor to represent the Government of Gibraltar, the Lords Commissioners of the Admiralty and the Principal Secretary of State for War, and two others appointed by the Governor at each regular election.)
	First party
Party	Independent
Seats won	4
Seat change	0
Popular vote	2,459
Percentage	100%
Chairman before election
James Andrews-Speed
Independent
Chairman after election
TBD

The 1924 Gibraltar City Council election was held in Gibraltar on 1 December 1924 to elect four members of the City Council of Gibraltar. It was the second election to the council, held three years after the first election of 1 December 1921, and the first at which sitting councillors sought re-election.

Eight candidates contested the four wards, a poll being held in each. Two of the four councillors returned in 1921, Gustave Bellotti in Castle Ward and Augustin Ernest Huart in Cathedral Ward, were re-elected; the seats for Old Town Ward and Europa Ward were won by Nemesio Plácido Cortés and Peter Freeman Lyons respectively. Old Town Ward produced the closest contest in the council's short history to that date, Cortés defeating Mesod Menahem Benady by six votes, while in Europa Ward Lyons took more than 96 per cent of the votes recorded. A total of 2,459 votes were recorded across the four wards.

== Background ==
The City Council had been established under the City Council Ordinance 1921, enacted on 22 August 1921 by the Governor, Sir Horace Smith-Dorrien, and brought into force on 1 October 1921. It replaced the Board of Sanitary Commissioners, a wholly nominated body, and took over the management of drainage, water supply, sanitation and related municipal matters. Of its nine members, four were elected and five nominated or appointed by the Governor, so that the official and appointed members retained a majority.

In the three years between the two elections the colony's constitutional arrangements were altered only marginally. In October 1922 a consultative Executive Council was established, comprising four ex-officio members and three unofficial members appointed by the Governor; its role was purely advisory, and the Governor retained full legislative, administrative and executive powers. James Andrews-Speed, the council's elected chairman, was among the three unofficial members appointed to it. Smith-Dorrien was succeeded as Governor in 1923 by General Sir Charles Monro. When the local Workers' Union asked Monro to appoint a labour representative to the Executive Council on the ground that it did not represent all sections of the community, he rejected the request, characterising such claims as "hardly compatible with the existence of Gibraltar as a Military Fortress".

Because both elected and appointed councillors served three-year terms, the four seats filled in 1921 fell vacant in 1924, and a fresh register of electors was due to be prepared during the year and published by 1 October.

== Electoral system ==
The composition of the council and the conduct of the election continued to be governed by the City Council Ordinance 1921, which had not been amended in this respect since the first election. The council consisted of nine members: three councillors nominated by the Governor to represent, respectively, the Government of Gibraltar, the Lords Commissioners of the Admiralty and the Principal Secretary of State for War; two councillors appointed by the Governor at each regular election; and four councillors elected by the electors. The five nominated and appointed members thus outnumbered the four elected members. No woman was eligible to hold the office of councillor. Both elected and appointed councillors served three-year terms.

Gibraltar remained divided into the four wards set out in the first schedule to the ordinance, namely Old Town, Castle, Cathedral and Europa, each ward electing and returning one councillor. The schedule defined the wards by reference to the colony's police districts and detailed street boundaries; the Old Town, Castle and Cathedral wards covered the built-up town, while the Europa Ward extended southwards over the rest of the peninsula, including the Rosia, Naval Hospital, Buena Vista and Windmill Hill areas.

As at the first election, an elector could vote only for the candidate standing in the ward in which he resided. Voting in all four wards was not introduced until an amending ordinance of 1927.

=== Franchise ===
Under section 15 of the ordinance, a person was entitled to be registered as an elector if he was a British subject of full age (21 years), not under any legal incapacity, not in arrears on his rates, and had for at least six months in the year the register was prepared occupied land or premises in Gibraltar as owner or tenant; "tenant" included a person occupying a room or rooms as a lodger. The ordinance expressly provided that no woman was entitled to be registered as an elector, and that no member of the Naval or Military Forces or civil servant of the Crown occupying a Crown residence or quarters free of rent could register in respect of that occupation. The exclusion of women contrasted with the United Kingdom, where a female franchise had been introduced in 1918.

A register of electors was prepared during 1921 and every third year thereafter, published by 1 October, under a Registration Officer appointed by the Governor; appeals against registration decisions lay to the Police Magistrate and, on a point of law, to the Supreme Court. This election was accordingly the first to be fought on a revised register.

=== Qualification of candidates ===
To qualify for election a candidate had to be a British subject by birth and of full age (21 years), a resident of Gibraltar occupying a dwelling house (or part of one) for at least eight months a year, and able to read and write English; a prescribed statutory declaration to this effect, sworn before a Justice of the Peace, was set out in the second schedule to the ordinance. Undischarged bankrupts and persons convicted of a felony or sentenced to more than three months' imprisonment were disqualified. No property qualification was imposed.

== Candidates ==
Every candidate had to notify the returning officer in writing at least 21 days before the poll, supported by the sworn declaration, and could appoint an election agent; the Registration Officer acted as Returning Officer. Where only one candidate came forward in a ward, he was declared elected unopposed, and where more than one stood a poll was held. A poll was held in each of the four wards, two candidates standing in every ward.

Two sitting councillors sought re-election: Gustave Bellotti in Castle Ward and Augustin Ernest Huart in Cathedral Ward. The councillors returned in 1921 for Old Town Ward and Europa Ward, Charles Thomas Pou and the chairman James Andrews-Speed, did not stand. Herbert Francis Joseph Maxted, who had signed the notice of the 1921 result as Returning Officer, stood as a candidate in Europa Ward; the returning officer at this election was I. M. Wahnon.

== Ward results ==
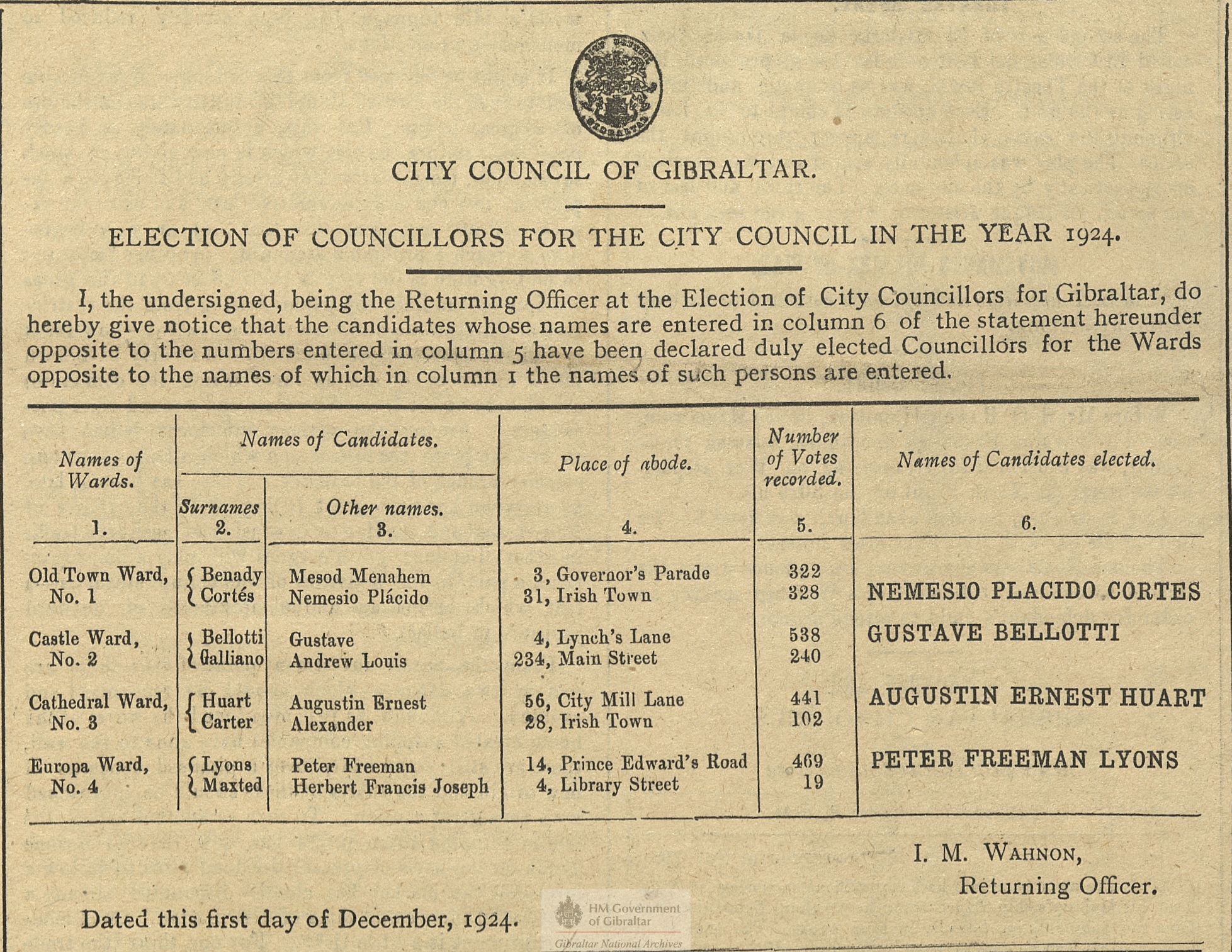
Official notice of the 1924 City Council of Gibraltar election results, signed by Returning Officer I. M. Wahnon

A total of 2,459 votes were recorded across the four wards, against 2,997 at the first election in 1921. The contests varied widely in closeness: the margin in Old Town Ward was six votes, while in Europa Ward the defeated candidate received 19 votes. Castle Ward returned the largest number of votes recorded of any ward, and Europa Ward the smallest. All eight candidates stood without party labels. A bold asterisk (*) denotes a sitting councillor seeking re-election.

=== Old Town Ward ===
Old Town Ward, No. 1 (1 seat)
Party	Candidate	Votes	%	±%
Independent	Nemesio Plácido Cortés	328	50.5	
Independent	Mesod Menahem Benady	322	49.5	
Majority		6	0.9	
Turnout		650		
Independent hold		Swing		

=== Castle Ward ===
Castle Ward, No. 2 (1 seat)
Party	Candidate	Votes	%	±%
Independent	Gustave Bellotti *	538	69.2	−9.8
Independent	Andrew Louis Galliano	240	30.8	
Majority		298	38.3	
Turnout		778		
Independent hold		Swing		

=== Cathedral Ward ===
Cathedral Ward, No. 3 (1 seat)
Party	Candidate	Votes	%	±%
Independent	Augustin Ernest Huart *	441	81.2	−0.7
Independent	Alexander Carter	102	18.8	
Majority		339	62.4	
Turnout		543		
Independent hold		Swing		

=== Europa Ward ===
Europa Ward, No. 4 (1 seat)
Party	Candidate	Votes	%	±%
Independent	Peter Freeman Lyons	469	96.1	
Independent	Herbert Francis Joseph Maxted	19	3.9	
Majority		450	92.2	
Turnout		488		
Independent hold		Swing		

== Council composition ==
The four councillors returned were as follows:

Councillors elected to the City Council of Gibraltar, 1924
Governor
Sir Charles Monro
Elected by the electors
Name	Role
Nemesio Plácido Cortés	Councillor for Old Town Ward
Gustave Bellotti	Councillor for Castle Ward
Augustin Ernest Huart	Councillor for Cathedral Ward
Peter Freeman Lyons	Councillor for Europa Ward

== Aftermath ==
The four councillors returned in 1924 continued to sit alongside the five members nominated and appointed by the Governor, who retained a majority on the council. Demands for wider representation continued, and in February 1926 Monro rejected a call for a majority of elected members on the City Council; a further request by the Exchange and Commercial Library was refused in 1929.

The franchise was widened in a different direction at the following election. An amending ordinance of 1927 allowed an elector to vote in all four wards rather than only in the ward in which he resided. An elected majority on the council was not conceded until it was reconstituted in 1945, after its suspension during the Second World War. The council continued to operate until it was abolished in 1969, when it was merged with the Legislative Council to form the Gibraltar House of Assembly.
