= 1957 Gibraltar by-election =

1957 by-election in Gibraltar

- 29 May 1957

2 of the 7 elected seats in the Legislative Council (Note: The seats-before figures are each party's total among the seven elected seats as returned at the 1956 general election, the position immediately before the by-election; the seats-after figures are the totals following the by-election. The two contested seats had been held by the AACR (Alcantara) and the Commonwealth Party (Triay).)
- Turnout: 29% (Note: Garcia gives the turnout as 29%. The Colonial Office annual report gave it as about 27%, with some 3,700 votes cast from an electorate of about 14,000.)
	First party	Second party	Third party
Candidate	Aurelius Montegriffo	Ernest Russo	Alfred Vasquez
Leader	Joshua Hassan		Alfred Vasquez
Party	AACR	Independent	Commonwealth
Seats before	4	2	1
Seats after	4	3	0
Seat change	Steady	▲1	▼1

A by-election was held in Gibraltar on 29 May 1957 to fill two elected seats in the Legislative Council of Gibraltar. The vacancies followed the resignations of Juan José Triay, leader of the Commonwealth Party, and John Alcantara of the Association for the Advancement of Civil Rights (AACR). Three candidates contested the two seats. The AACR's Aurelius Montegriffo and the independent Ernest Russo were elected, while the Commonwealth Party's Alfred Vasquez was defeated. The result left the Commonwealth Party without representation in the legislature, and the party was dissolved within weeks. Afterwards the seven elected members of the Council comprised four from the AACR and three independents.

== Background ==
The Legislative Council had been established in 1950, replacing the City Council as the territory's principal elected body. At the general election of 21 September 1956 the number of elected seats in the Legislative Council was expanded from five to seven; the AACR won four, the Commonwealth Party won one, held by its leader Juan José Triay, and two seats went to independents. The Commonwealth Party, founded by Triay in 1954, was the first organised party to stand against the AACR, which had dominated Gibraltarian politics since 1950.

== Electoral system ==
The Legislative Council was elected by single transferable vote, and elections were governed by the Elections Ordinance 1950. The franchise extended to adult British subjects and citizens of the Republic of Ireland ordinarily resident in Gibraltar for a continuous period of twelve months ending on the qualifying date, with provision for those resident in neighbouring Spanish territory during part of that period; members of the armed forces not domiciled in Gibraltar were excluded.

== Vacancies ==
The frontier restrictions imposed by Spain had an indirect effect on local Gibraltarian politics in early 1957. A reciprocal Anglo-Spanish agreement at the start of the year made visas valid for a year and for an unlimited number of entries and exits, but the Spanish authorities held that this did not apply at the Gibraltar frontier, which they treated as a special military post rather than a normal entry into Spain. On 16 March the unofficial members of the Legislative Council met and sent a strongly worded letter to the Colonial Secretary, Darrell Bates, urging London to raise the matter with Spain and insisting that visas should be the same for all British subjects.

On 22 March, the day the British ambassador in Madrid, Sir Ivo Mallet, discussed the situation with the Governor and the legislature, Triay resigned in protest from both the Executive and Legislative Councils, objecting to the silence adopted by the other elected members over the Spanish visa restrictions. His party did not support the move; Triay and his brother, J. E. Triay, left the Commonwealth Party, its newspaper Vox ceased to be the party organ, and the lawyer Alfred Vasquez became the party's new president. Triay's resignation was followed in May by that of John Alcantara, the AACR member, who gave up his seat on his appointment as Registrar of the Supreme Court. Two seats therefore fell vacant in the Legislative Council.

== Campaign ==
Three candidates came forward to contest the two seats. Aurelius Montegriffo stood for the AACR, Alfred Vasquez for the Commonwealth Party, and Ernest Russo, a local lawyer, as an independent.

== Results ==
On a turnout of 29%, Montegriffo was elected on the first count with 1,821 first-preference votes, 49% of those cast. After the transfer of his surplus, Russo reached a total of 1,473 and took the second seat, while Vasquez finished on 992 and was not elected. (Note: Garcia records Montegriffo's first-preference vote (1,821, given as 49% of the poll, which implies a total of about 3,716; the Colonial Office report gives the poll as "some 3,700" votes) and the totals reached by Russo and Vasquez after the transfer of Montegriffo's surplus. He does not record the individual first-preference votes of Russo and Vasquez, whose combined first preferences made up the balance of the poll.) The outcome returned the Council's elected membership to four AACR members and three independents.

Results of the 1957 Gibraltar Legislative Council by-election
Party	Candidate	FPv%	Count	
Party	Candidate	FPv%	1	2
AACR	Aurelius Montegriffo	49.0	1,821	
Independent	Ernest Russo			1,473
Commonwealth	Alfred Vasquez			992
Quota: c. 1,239 (Note: The source does not state the quota; the figure shown is the Droop quota implied by the estimated poll of about 3,716 votes for two seats, and is approximate.) Turnout: 29%

== Composition ==
The two seats that fell vacant had last been held by the AACR (Alcantara) and the Commonwealth Party (Triay). The AACR retained a seat through Montegriffo and the second seat was won by the independent Ernest Russo, while the Commonwealth Party, whose new leader Vasquez had stood, failed to retain its seat. Because both vacancies were filled together under STV, the change is best expressed as a net one: the AACR was unchanged at four seats, the Commonwealth Party lost its only seat, and the independents gained one. In conventional terms this amounted to one AACR hold and one independent gain from the Commonwealth Party.

Elected members of the Legislative Council (Note: The "before" column shows the elected seats as returned at the 1956 general election, the last occasion on which the two contested seats had been filled.)
Party	Before	After	Change
Association for the Advancement of Civil Rights	4	4	Steady
Independents	2	3	▲1
Commonwealth Party	1	0	▼1
Total	7	7	Steady

== Aftermath ==
The Commonwealth Party had been gravely weakened by Triay's resignation, and Vasquez's defeat proved decisive. Vasquez resigned the presidency on 14 June 1957, walking out of a sparsely attended annual general meeting; the chair passed briefly to Emilio Peire, but the meeting closed without the party appointing any office-bearers, and the party effectively ceased to exist. It was the first organised opposition to the AACR, and no further rival emerged until the Integration with Britain Party in 1967.

The two new members, Montegriffo and Russo, were initially left out of the "Member system" introduced on 15 November 1957, under which unofficial members of the legislature were associated with the work of government departments; they were brought into the arrangement in January 1958.
