= 1956 Gibraltar City Council election =

Municipal election in Gibraltar

- 5 December 1956

All 7 elective seats on the City Council of Gibraltar (Note: The council had 11 members in total following a reduction from 13 ahead of the election: the seven elected councillors and four non-elective members appointed by the Governor.)
- Turnout: c. 40% (▼ c. 10 pp)
	First party	Second party	Third party
Leader	Joshua Hassan	Juan José Triay
Party	AACR	Commonwealth	Independents
Leader since	1948
Seats won	5	1	1

Elections to the City Council of Gibraltar were held in Gibraltar on 5 December 1956 to fill the seven elective seats on the council. The Association for the Advancement of Civil Rights (AACR), led by Joshua Hassan, won all five of the seats it contested; the newly formed Commonwealth Party took one seat and an independent the other. Hassan headed the poll.

The contest was a municipal election and was held separately from, and about two and a half months after, the general election to the Legislative Council on 19 September 1956.

== Background ==
The City Council of Gibraltar, first established in 1921, was responsible for municipal affairs in the colony, including public health, the maintenance of highways and the provision of utilities; hospitals, education and the administration of the port remained the responsibility of the Government, and the Governor retained certain controlling powers over the council's finances.

Ahead of the election the council was reduced from thirteen to eleven members as part of the constitutional changes announced in July 1956, the number of members appointed by the Governor being cut from five to four while the seven elected seats were retained; the same package enlarged the elected element of the Legislative Council from five to seven.

The AACR had controlled the elected seats on the council since the movement swept the board at the first post-war municipal election in 1945, and it went into the 1956 poll having also remained the largest party in the Legislative Council at the general election some eleven weeks earlier.

== Electoral system ==
Seven of the council's eleven seats were filled by election for a three-year term. Each elector was allotted four votes with which to return the seven councillors, a system introduced in 1945 to prevent any single party from capturing every seat with an organised bloc of supporters. The proportional system used for the Legislative Council was not extended to the municipality, the authorities judging that to do so would provoke strong opposition.

== Candidates ==
Ten candidates contested the seven seats: five put forward by the AACR, headed by Joshua Hassan, Mayor of Gibraltar and Senior Elected Member of the legislature; two by the Commonwealth Party, Guy Stagnetto and Louis Bruzon; and three independents.

== Results ==
About 5,300 people voted, a turnout of roughly 40%, down from about 50% at the 1953 municipal election and a fall of nearly 1,200 on the number who had voted then. All five AACR candidates were elected, with Hassan topping the poll for the second time within three months, having also headed the poll at the September general election. The Commonwealth Party's Guy Stagnetto took the seventh and last seat, keeping out his running mate Louis Bruzon by 22 votes, while the independent William Isola, brother of the legislative member Peter Isola, was returned in fifth place. As it had since 1945, the AACR maximised its return by instructing supporters to cast their four votes for four of its five nominees in a different order in different districts.

Party	Votes	%	Seats	+/–
Association for the Advancement of Civil Rights			5	0
Commonwealth Party			1	New
Independents			1	−1
Total			7	0
Total votes	5,300	–		
Registered voters/turnout		c. 40		
Source: Garcia; Gibraltar: Report for the Year 1956

== Aftermath ==
The result confirmed the AACR's continued command of the municipality; of the ten candidates the party fielded across the September and December 1956 elections to the two councils, all were returned. The Commonwealth Party, which had won its first council seat through Stagnetto, declined thereafter: its leader Juan José Triay resigned from the Legislative Council in 1957 and the party dissolved that year. The council continued to administer municipal affairs in Gibraltar until it was abolished in 1969, when its functions and those of the Legislative Council were merged into the new Gibraltar House of Assembly.
