= 1950 Gibraltar City Council election =

Municipal election in Gibraltar

- 6 December 1950

All 7 elective seats on the City Council of Gibraltar (Note: The council had 13 members in total: the seven elected councillors plus six non-elective members—five appointed by the Governor and the Chief Medical Officer, who sat ex officio.)
- Turnout: c. 35% (Note: The Colonial Office report records that 4,142 people voted; Garcia gives the turnout as about 35% of the electorate. The preceding 1947 election had been an uncontested walkover, and the last contested poll, in 1945, had been held on a much narrower, ratepayer- and male-only franchise, so earlier turnout figures are not directly comparable.)
	First party	Second party
Leader	Joshua Hassan
Party	AACR	Independents
Leader since	1948
Last election	7	0
Seats won	4	3

Elections to the City Council of Gibraltar were held in Gibraltar on 6 December 1950 to fill the seven elective seats on the council. The Association for the Advancement of Civil Rights (AACR), led by Joshua Hassan, won four of the seven seats, with the remaining three going to independents; Hassan headed the poll. It was the first contested municipal election in Gibraltar since 1945, the intervening 1947 poll having been an uncontested walkover in which the seven AACR candidates were returned unopposed.

The contest was a municipal election and was held separately from, and about a month after, the first elections to the newly created Legislative Council on 8 November 1950. Both polls were governed by the same Elections Ordinance, 1950, but whereas the five elected seats on the Legislative Council were filled by proportional representation, the City Council seats were not. The municipal poll went almost unnoticed in comparison with the legislature election, which had dominated public attention.

== Background ==
The City Council of Gibraltar, first established in 1921, was responsible for municipal affairs in the colony. Its functions included fire prevention, the enforcement of public health measures, the maintenance of highways, the provision of water, electricity, gas and a telephone service, and the issuing of vehicle, driving and dog licences. Hospitals, education and the administration of the port were the responsibility of the Government rather than the council, and the Governor retained certain controlling powers over the council's finances.

At the time of the election the council had 13 members: seven elected councillors and five councillors appointed by the Governor, together with the Chief Medical Officer, who sat ex officio. The appointed members had to include one representative each of the Naval, Military and Air Forces, who held office during the Governor's pleasure; the remaining appointed members served three-year terms, as did the elected councillors.

The AACR, formed in 1942, had swept all seven elective seats at the reconstitution of the council in 1945 and had held them since, its seven candidates having been returned unopposed at the December 1947 walkover—the poll at which Dorothy Ellicott became the first woman member of the council. The party's president, Joshua Hassan, had served as chairman of the council since 1945. The municipal poll of December 1950 followed within weeks of the AACR's success at the inaugural Legislative Council election, at which the party had won three of the five elected seats and Hassan had been returned along with two other AACR candidates.

== Electoral system ==
Seven of the council's thirteen seats were filled by election for a three-year term. The system of proportional representation used for the Legislative Council was not applied to the City Council; the municipal seats were instead filled by limited voting, with each elector having four votes to return the seven councillors. (Note: Garcia describes the four-vote arrangement, and the AACR's unsuccessful request that electors be given seven votes—one for each vacancy, which would have helped the party sweep every seat—in his account of the 1953 municipal election, held under the same Elections Ordinance. The AACR nominated only four candidates in 1950.)

The franchise was the same as for the Legislative Council election: it was exercisable by all adult British subjects and citizens of the Republic of Ireland who had been ordinarily resident in Gibraltar for a continuous period of twelve months ending on the qualifying date for registration, with provision for electors who had been resident in neighbouring Spanish territory during the qualifying period; members of the Armed Forces not domiciled in Gibraltar were excluded.

To stand for election a candidate had, in addition to holding the qualifications required of a voter, to be able to speak, read and write English. Employees of the City Council and, with certain exceptions, Government employees were ineligible.

== Candidates ==
Eleven candidates contested the seven seats: four put forward by the AACR, headed by Joshua Hassan, and seven independents. The AACR chose to contest only four of the seven seats it had held since 1945, a decision reflecting the low profile of the municipal poll beside the Legislative Council election held the previous month.

== Results ==
A total of 4,142 people voted, a turnout of about 35% of the electorate. All four AACR candidates were elected, with Hassan topping the poll, and the remaining three seats were taken by independents.

Party	Votes	%	Seats	+/–
Association for the Advancement of Civil Rights			4	−3
Independents			3	+3
Total			7	0
Registered voters/turnout		c. 35		
Source: Garcia

== Aftermath ==
The council continued to administer municipal affairs alongside the newly created Legislative Council, the two bodies running in parallel. The AACR strengthened its hold at the next municipal election on 2 December 1953, when a higher turnout of about 50% returned all five of the candidates it fielded, with Hassan again heading the poll and independents taking the other two seats. The title of Chairman of the City Council was changed to "Mayor" in late 1955. The council continued until it was abolished in 1969, when its functions and those of the Legislative Council were merged into the new Gibraltar House of Assembly.
