= 1947 Gibraltar City Council election =

Municipal election in Gibraltar

- 17 December 1947

All 7 elective seats on the City Council of Gibraltar (Note: The council had 13 members in total: the seven elected councillors plus six non-elective members—five appointed by the Governor and the Chief Medical Officer, who sat ex officio.)
- Turnout: No poll held (Note: The seven AACR candidates were the only ones nominated for the seven vacant seats and were returned unopposed, so no ballot took place.)
	First party	Second party
Leader	Albert Risso
Party	AACR	Independents
Leader since	1942
Last election	7	0
Seats won	7	0

Elections to the City Council of Gibraltar were due to be held in Gibraltar on 17 December 1947 to fill the seven elective seats on the council. The seven candidates nominated by the Association for the Advancement of Civil Rights (AACR) were the only ones to stand, and all were returned unopposed in a walkover.

Although the franchise had been widened earlier in 1947 to allow women to vote and to stand for election for the first time, the absence of a contest meant that no ballot was held; Gibraltarian women were not able to cast a vote until the elections of 1950. Dorothy Ellicott, one of the seven, became the first woman member of the council.

== Background ==
The City Council of Gibraltar had administered municipal affairs in the colony since 1921. It had been suspended for most of the Second World War and was reconstituted in 1945 with an elected majority for the first time: of its 13 members, seven were elected and six were nominated or appointed by the Governor (including one representative each of the Naval, Military and Air Forces), the elected councillors serving three-year terms.

The AACR, formed in 1942 under the presidency of Albert Risso, had swept all seven elective seats at the July 1945 election, the first post-war municipal poll, with Joshua Hassan—the party's vice-president—becoming chairman of the reconstituted council. By 1947 the AACR's dominance was such that its opponents, the pre-war "old guard" who had unsuccessfully contested the 1945 election, declined to put up any candidates.

== Electoral system ==
Seven of the council's thirteen seats were filled by election for a three-year term. Earlier in 1947 the government agreed to changes in the electoral law under which women were enfranchised and permitted to stand for election for the first time, and the register of electors was supplemented to include evacuees who had returned to the Rock; the change was announced to the council on 22 May 1947. At the 1945 election the vote had been confined to male British subjects over the age of 21 who had been ordinarily resident in Gibraltar for at least twelve months.

== Candidates ==
At an extraordinary general meeting of the AACR on 24 November 1947, Joshua Hassan announced that the party would field a woman candidate for the first time. Its seven-candidate slate included Hassan, Emilio Alvarez and Dorothy Ellicott, the first woman to seek election to the council. (Note: Garcia names Hassan, Alvarez and Ellicott among the seven AACR candidates but does not list the remaining four.) Three days after the meeting the Gibraltar government announced that these were the only candidates to have been nominated for the seven vacant seats.

== Result ==
With no other candidates standing, the seven AACR candidates were returned unopposed and no poll took place. Dorothy Ellicott thereby became the first woman to sit on the City Council, although, because of the walkover, Gibraltarian women had to wait until the elections of 1950 before they could exercise their newly granted right to vote. Garcia characterised the unopposed return as a measure of the AACR's strength and popularity in the immediate post-war years, its opponents fearing another heavy defeat.

== Aftermath ==
The AACR continued to hold all seven elective seats until the 1950 municipal election on 6 December 1950—the first contested municipal poll since 1945—at which it chose to field only four candidates and won four seats, with independents taking the other three. The council continued to administer municipal affairs alongside the newly created Legislative Council from 1950 until it was abolished in 1969, when the two bodies were merged into the Gibraltar House of Assembly.
