= Parliament Act (Gibraltar) =

Principal electoral and parliamentary-privilege statute of Gibraltar

- Act of the Gibraltar Parliament
- Parliament of Gibraltar
- Long title: An Act to govern elections to the Gibraltar Parliament, the powers and privileges attaching to the Parliament and the pensions payable to members of the Parliament.
- Citation: Act No. 1950-15
- Territorial extent: Gibraltar

Dates
- Commencement: 21 July 1950 (Parts II–IV); 12 June 1964 (Part V); 20 December 1979 (Part VI)

Other legislation
- Amended by: Parliament (Amendment) Act 2023 (2023-18), 27 July 2023; Parliament (Amendment) Act 2019 (2019-02), 31 January 2019; Parliament (Amendment) Act 2016 (2016-07), 10 March 2016; Parliament (Amendment) Act 2014 (2015-06), 26 February 2015; Parliament (Amendment) Act 2007 (2007-30), 28 June 2007; Gibraltar Laws (General Amendment) (No.1) Act 2007 (2007-17), 14 June 2007; House of Assembly Act (Amendment) Act 2003 (2003-05), 7 May 2003; House of Assembly (Amendment) Act 1995 (1995-17), 22 December 1995; House of Assembly (Amendment) Act 1987 (1987-25), 29 October 1987; House of Assembly (Amendment) Act 1986 (1986-01), 6 February 1986

Status: Amended

Text of statute as originally enacted

The Parliament Act (Act No. 1950-15), originally enacted as the Elections Ordinance, 1950 (No. 15 of 1950) and renamed the House of Assembly Act following the Gibraltar Constitution Order 1969 before taking its present title under the Gibraltar Constitution Order 2006, (Note: Gibraltar's primary legislation was styled "Ordinance" until the Gibraltar Constitution Order 2006 took effect on 2 January 2007, when references to "Ordinance" were replaced by "Act" and references to the "Assembly" by "Parliament". Contemporary sources from 1969 to 2006 therefore refer to the statute as the House of Assembly Ordinance, while the consolidated Laws of Gibraltar render it the House of Assembly Act.) is the principal statute of Gibraltar governing elections to the territory's legislature, the powers and privileges of that legislature, and the pensions payable to its members. First enacted in 1950 and commonly cited as the Parliament Act 1950, it has been repeatedly amended and consolidated and remains in force as one of the constitutional statutes of Gibraltar.

The Act operates alongside the written constitution contained in the Gibraltar Constitution Order 2006: the constitution establishes the Parliament and the office of elected member, while the Parliament Act supplies the detailed machinery for the franchise, the conduct of elections, election offences, election petitions, parliamentary privilege and members' pensions.

== Background ==
=== Road to a franchise ===
The inhabitants of Gibraltar acquired a political franchise only after a long delay, attributed to the territory's status as a military fortress, which made successive British governments reluctant to extend the political rights being granted elsewhere in the British Empire. Through the nineteenth century civilian involvement was confined to municipal and public health bodies such as the Sanitary Commissioners established in 1865, on which the Governor retained an official majority. A City Council with a minority of elected members was created by the City Council Ordinance 1921, but the vote was restricted to ratepayers and its powers were limited to municipal matters. After the Second World War the City Council was reconstituted with an elected majority and a broader franchise, and the Association for the Advancement of Civil Rights (AACR), founded in 1942, pressed for greater self-government.

=== The 1950 Legislative Council ===
Following a 1948 visit by the Minister of State for Colonial Affairs, the British government agreed to establish a legislature for Gibraltar. The Gibraltar (Legislative Council) Order in Council came into effect on 3 February 1950, creating the Gibraltar Legislative Council and introducing an elected element into the legislature for the first time; it is generally regarded as Gibraltar's first constitution. The Council comprised the Governor as President, three ex officio members, two nominated members and five elected members, with the Governor retaining reserved powers. The first elections were held on 8 November 1950, the first poll of any kind in Gibraltar in which women could vote, and were conducted by proportional representation; the Council was ceremonially inaugurated on 23 November 1950 by the Duke of Edinburgh. The Parliament Act was enacted in 1950 as the statutory framework accompanying this reform.

=== Later constitutions and change of title ===
As originally enacted, the statute was the Elections Ordinance, 1950 (No. 15 of 1950), and in 1950 it dealt only with elections to the Legislative Council and the franchise; it also governed City Council elections, though without proportional representation. The statute was still cited as the Elections Ordinance, 1950 in official reports of the mid-1960s, by which time the normal life of the Legislative Council had been extended to five years. As Gibraltar's constitutional arrangements developed, the legislature was successively restyled and the Act's short title changed with it. An Order in Council of 1956 provided for a Speaker and increased the elected membership from five to seven, producing the first elected majority; constitutional changes in 1964 further increased the elected membership, abolished the nominated members and introduced a Council of Ministers. Under the Gibraltar Constitution Order 1969 the Legislative Council merged with the City Council to form the Gibraltar House of Assembly, the franchise was extended to adult British subjects resident for six months, and a 1969 ordinance lowered the voting age from 21 to 18; from this reorganisation the statute became the House of Assembly Act, the title under which it appears in the consolidated Laws of Gibraltar (the earliest revised edition being that of 31 December 1983), though contemporary sources of the period style it the House of Assembly Ordinance. When the Gibraltar Constitution Order 2006 came into force on 2 January 2007 it restyled the House of Assembly as the Gibraltar Parliament; as part of the wider updating of the statute book that followed the new constitution (under which references to "Ordinance" became "Act" and references to the "Assembly" became "Parliament"), the statute was renamed the Parliament Act.

== Provisions ==
The consolidated Act is divided into six parts and three schedules.

=== Part I: Preliminary ===
Part I gives the short title and defines the terms used in the Act, including "Clerk", "returning officer", "registration officer", "election agent", "corrupt practice", "member" and "precincts of the Parliament Chamber". Many expressions are given the same meaning as in the constitution.

=== Part II: Elections ===
Part II sets out the electoral machinery. The franchise provisions define who is entitled to vote: broadly, persons who have lived in Gibraltar throughout a qualifying period of six months, intend to live there permanently or indefinitely, are aged 18 or over on the qualifying date and the date of the poll, and hold a qualifying British nationality status under the British Nationality Act 1981, subject to disqualifications (for example, allegiance to a foreign power, certain criminal sentences, or mental incapacity). Only persons on the register of electors may vote.

The registration of electors is entrusted to an electoral registration officer (the Clerk of the Parliament), who must prepare and publish a register and any supplements to it; decisions of the registration officer are subject to appeal to the Supreme Court of Gibraltar. Further provisions govern the eligibility of public officers to stand for election, the appointment of election agents, limits on election expenditure (capped per candidate) and returns of election expenses. The conduct of elections is placed in the hands of a returning officer (who is the registration officer), acting under rules made under the Act; the Governor issues the writ for a general election. Under the method-of-voting provision, at a contested election each elector may vote for as many candidates as there are vacancies, subject to a maximum of ten where there are more than ten vacancies, which is the basis of Gibraltar's limited voting system.

=== Part III: Election offences ===
Part III creates a range of illegal practices (such as providing money for an illegal payment, corruptly inducing a candidate to withdraw, restrictions on premises used as committee rooms, illegal employment of canvassers, exceeding the expenditure limit and failing to publish printers' details on election material) and corrupt practices (bribery, treating, undue influence and personation), each defined in the Act. It also creates offences relating to interference with ballot papers and ballot boxes and to breaches of the secrecy of the ballot, and sets out the resulting penalties and the incapacities (loss of the right to vote or to sit) that follow conviction.

=== Part IV: Election petitions ===
Part IV provides that an election may be questioned only by an election petition presented to the Supreme Court, on grounds such as widespread offences affecting the result, disqualification of the person elected, or that the person was not duly elected. It regulates who may petition, the security for costs, the trial of petitions (applying, so far as circumstances permit, the law of England on election petitions), and the duties of the Attorney-General.

=== Part V: Powers and privileges of the Parliament ===
Part V codifies parliamentary privilege in Gibraltar. It guarantees freedom of speech and debate, grants members immunity from legal proceedings for words spoken or written in the Parliament, provides for the exclusion of strangers, restricts the giving of evidence about proceedings, and confers immunity from civil process within the precincts. It gives the Parliament and its committees power to summon witnesses and require the production of documents, to examine witnesses on oath and to protect them, and creates offences of giving false evidence, interfering with witnesses, corrupt practices affecting members, contempt, disobedience, breaches of confidence and assaulting members or officers. Where a question of privilege is not expressly resolved by the Act, it is to be determined in accordance with the usage and practice of the House of Commons of the United Kingdom. This part largely derives from a 1964 amending Act.

=== Part VI: Pensions ===
Part VI provides for pensions payable to elected members, defined to include the Speaker, ordinary elected members, the Chief Minister, ministers and the Leader of the Opposition. It sets out the qualifying service, the computation of pensions and of the "notional annual allowance", options to commute part of a pension for a gratuity, the effect of re-election, gratuities on death, and enhanced provision for members injured or contracting disease on duty. Pensions are charged on the Consolidated Fund of Gibraltar. This part largely derives from a 1979 amending Act.

=== Schedules ===
The three schedules list the classes of public officers who may be elected as members (Schedule 1), the classes of public officers who may be candidates for election on giving an undertaking to relinquish office if elected (Schedule 2), and the form of that undertaking (Schedule 3).

== Subsidiary legislation ==
Section 25 of the Act empowers the responsible Minister to make rules for the registration of voters and the conduct of elections. The principal instrument made under this power is the Elections Rules (originally the Election Rules 1950, legislative reference 1950.07.20-1), which contain the detailed procedure for nominations, ballot papers, polling, counting and related matters; the Rules have been amended several times, most recently in 2023. An accompanying instrument, the Electors (Registration) Rules (1950.07.20-2), formerly governed the registration process but has since been repealed.

== Legislative history ==
The Act was first enacted in 1950 as the Elections Ordinance, 1950 and has since been consolidated with, and amended by, numerous later enactments. The principal Act is Act No. 1950-15, with commencement of Parts II–IV on 21 July 1950. The powers and privileges provisions now forming Part V derive from Act 1964-03 (with effect from 12 June 1964) and the pensions provisions now forming Part VI from Act 1979-22 (with effect from 20 December 1979); these were consolidated with the original elections statute, which was subsequently retitled the House of Assembly Act and, from 2007, the Parliament Act.

Selected amending enactments, showing the change of short title over time, include:

Year	Amending enactment	Commencement
1986	House of Assembly (Amendment) Act 1986 (1986-01)	6 February 1986
1987	House of Assembly (Amendment) Act 1987 (1987-25)	29 October 1987
1995	House of Assembly (Amendment) Act 1995 (1995-17)	22 December 1995
2003	House of Assembly Act (Amendment) Act 2003 (2003-05)	7 May 2003
2007	Gibraltar Laws (General Amendment) (No.1) Act 2007 (2007-17)	14 June 2007
2007	Parliament (Amendment) Act 2007 (2007-30)	28 June 2007
2015	Parliament (Amendment) Act 2014 (2015-06)	26 February 2015
2016	Parliament (Amendment) Act 2016 (2016-07)	10 March 2016
2019	Parliament (Amendment) Act 2019 (2019-02)	31 January 2019
2023	Parliament (Amendment) Act 2023 (2023-18)	27 July 2023

The change of short title from "House of Assembly Act" to "Parliament Act" was effected in 2007 following the coming into force of the Gibraltar Constitution Order 2006, which renamed the House of Assembly as the Gibraltar Parliament.

== See also ==
- Politics of Gibraltar
- Elections in Gibraltar
- Gibraltar Parliament
- Constitution of Gibraltar
- Gibraltar Constitution Order 1950
- Elections Rules
