= Party for the Autonomy of Gibraltar =

- Leader: Joseph Triay
- Founded: 7 September 1977; 47 years ago
- Dissolved: 1980s
- Ideology: Rapprochement with Spain; Integrationism
- Political position: Right-wing

The Party for the Autonomy of Gibraltar (PAG) was a minority right-wing political party in Gibraltar founded on 7 September 1977. It was led by Joseph Triay and advocated a rapprochement with Spain. It unsuccessfully contended the 1980 election.

== Policy ==
The PAG was led by Joseph Triay, a former member of the "Doves" in the 1960s and independent candidate in the 1976 election. It asked for a settlement with Spain, with an autonomous status for Gibraltar under Spanish sovereignty (following the Autonomies approach in the territorial structure of Spain made possible by the Spanish Constitution of 1978). It argued that it was pro-Gibraltarian and nationalist, and against the British colonial presence, seen as obstructing the development of the territory. On the other hand, its opponents labelled it as pro-Spanish and the "sell-out party".

Joe Bossano, Chief Minister of Gibraltar between 1988 and 1996 has accused Peter Caruana, Chief Minister between 1996 and 2011, of having been an electoral agent of the PAG.

== Elections ==
It nominated three candidates in the 1980 election, the Triay brothers and Tito Benady, obtaining poor results. Although the party still existed by the 1984 election, it decided not to contest.
