= 1953 Gibraltar City Council election =

Municipal election in Gibraltar

- 2 December 1953

All 7 elective seats on the City Council of Gibraltar (Note: The council had 13 members in total: the seven elected councillors plus six non-elective members—five appointed by the Governor and the Chief Medical Officer, who sat ex officio.)
- Turnout: c. 50% (▲ c. 15 pp)
	First party	Second party
Leader	Joshua Hassan
Party	AACR	Independents
Leader since	1948
Seats won	5	2

Elections to the City Council of Gibraltar were held in Gibraltar on 2 December 1953 to fill the seven elective seats on the council. The Association for the Advancement of Civil Rights (AACR), led by Joshua Hassan, won all five of the seats it contested, with the remaining two going to independents; Hassan headed the poll.

The contest was a municipal election and was held separately from, and about two and a half months after, the general election to the Legislative Council on 16 September 1953.

== Background ==
The City Council of Gibraltar, first established in 1921, was responsible for municipal affairs in the colony. Its functions included fire prevention, the enforcement of public health measures, the maintenance of highways, the provision of water, electricity, gas and a telephone service, and the issuing of vehicle, driving and dog licences. Hospitals, education and the administration of the port were the responsibility of the Government rather than the council, and the Governor retained certain controlling powers over the council's finances.

At the time of the election the council had 13 members: seven elected councillors and five councillors appointed by the Governor, together with the Chief Medical Officer, who sat ex officio. The appointed members had to include one representative each of the Naval, Military and Air Forces, who held office during the Governor's pleasure; the remaining appointed members served three-year terms, as did the elected councillors.

The AACR had controlled the elected seats on the council since the movement swept the board at the first post-war municipal election in 1945, and it went into the 1953 poll having also remained the largest party in the Legislative Council at the general election three months earlier.

== Electoral system ==
Seven of the council's thirteen seats were filled by election for a three-year term. Each elector was allotted four votes with which to return the seven councillors. In the run-up to the election the AACR had asked that electors instead be given seven votes, one for each vacant seat, but the authorities—wishing to limit the party's ability to sweep every seat with its organised bloc of supporters—declined the request.

To stand for election a candidate had, in addition to holding the qualifications required of a voter, to be able to speak, read and write English. Employees of the City Council and, with certain exceptions, as well as Government employees were ineligible.

== Candidates ==
Nine candidates contested the seven seats: five put forward by the AACR, headed by Joshua Hassan, and four independents.

== Results ==
A total of 6,530 people cast votes, a turnout of about 50% of the registered electorate and a sharp rise from the roughly 35% recorded at the 1950 municipal election. All five AACR candidates were elected, with Hassan topping the poll—his second time doing so in two months, having also headed the poll at the September general election. The independent Peter Russo, chairman of the last pre-war council, took the last seat by a margin of seven votes. The Governor, General Sir Gordon MacMillan, attributed the result to the AACR's organisation and the backing of the roughly 1,200-strong Gibraltar Confederation of Labour. Five of the elected members belonged to the AACR and the other two were independents.

Party	Votes	%	Seats	+/–
Association for the Advancement of Civil Rights			5	+1
Independents			2	−1
Total			7	0
Total votes	6,530	–		
Registered voters/turnout		c. 50		
Source: Garcia; Colonial Reports: Gibraltar 1954–1955

== Aftermath ==
The AACR retained its dominance of the elected seats at the next municipal election on 5 December 1956, when a lower turnout of about 40% again returned all five of its candidates, with Hassan once more heading the poll; the newly formed Commonwealth Party won its first council seat through Guy Stagnetto. The title of Chairman of the City Council was changed to "Mayor" in late 1955. The council continued to administer municipal affairs in Gibraltar until it was abolished in 1969, when its functions and those of the Legislative Council were merged into the new Gibraltar House of Assembly.
