= 2026 in Gibraltar =

Events in the year 2026 in Gibraltar.

== Incumbents ==
- Monarch: Charles III
- Chief Minister: Fabian Picardo

== Holidays ==
- 1 January – New Year's Day
- 28 March – Maundy Thursday
- 29 March – Good Friday
- 31 March – Easter Sunday
- 1 April – Easter Monday
- 28 April – Workers Memorial Day
- 1 May – May Day
- 17 June – King's Official Birthday
- 10 September – National Day
- 24 December – Christmas Eve
- 25 December – Christmas Day
- 26 December – Boxing Day
- 31 December – New Year's Eve

== Deaths ==
- 19 May – Tito Benady, 95, historian.
