= 1955 Gibraltar constitutional crisis =

1955 dispute over a Governor's use of reserve powers in Gibraltar

- Date: 27 July – 10 October 1955
- Location: Gibraltar
- Cause: The Governor's use of reserve powers to enact an import duty rejected by the Legislative Council
- Participants: Sir Harold Redman · Association for the Advancement of Civil Rights · Alan Lennox-Boyd
- Outcome: The Standing Finance Committee's remit widened to revenue; an undertaking that reserve powers would not in future be used without prior reference to the Secretary of State for the Colonies

The 1955 Gibraltar constitutional crisis was a political and constitutional dispute in Gibraltar between July and October 1955, the first of its kind in the territory's history. It arose when the Governor, General Sir Harold Redman, used his reserve powers to bring into force a 10% ad valorem import duty that the Legislative Council had rejected by six votes to four. The measure had been defeated when a nominated member, Peter Russo, unexpectedly voted with the five elected members, leaving the Governor's casting vote unable to save it.

In protest at the Governor's action, the five elected members of the Legislative Council resigned their seats on 30 September 1955, and the two Association for the Advancement of Civil Rights (AACR) members of the Executive Council resigned from that body also. The Secretary of State for the Colonies, Alan Lennox-Boyd, visited Gibraltar from 8 to 10 October and, while publicly upholding Redman's decision, reached a settlement under which the Standing Finance Committee of the legislature would in future be consulted on revenue as well as expenditure, and reserve powers would not be exercised again without prior reference to London. The five members were returned unopposed at a by-election on 6 December 1955, and the disputed duty was reduced in the 1956 budget later that month.

The crisis is regarded as a turning point in Gibraltar's constitutional development. No Governor of Gibraltar has used the reserve powers since, and the episode gave impetus to the constitutional reforms of the following years, which the historian Joseph Garcia characterised as largely the Colonial Office's adoption of an AACR blueprint.

== Background ==
The Legislative Council had been established in 1950, replacing the City Council as the territory's principal representative body. In 1955 it consisted of five elected members and five appointed members—three of them officials and two nominated unofficial members—with the Governor presiding as President and holding a casting vote. The AACR, led by Joshua Hassan, held four of the five elected seats, the fifth being held by the independent Albert R. Isola. The use of the Governor's casting vote was not in itself unusual; it had last been used that February, when the acting Governor had defeated an AACR motion on hospital fees.

General Sir Harold Redman, who had been Vice-Chief of the Imperial General Staff since 1952, took office as Governor in May 1955. He had little experience of colonial administration, and at the time of the crisis the Colonial Secretary, Darrell Bates—normally the mainstay of civilian government on the Rock—was away on leave, with the Attorney General, Dairmoid Conroy, acting in his place.

The colony's finances had been weakened by Spanish restrictions at the frontier, which had intensified after the Queen's visit to Gibraltar in 1954 and had reduced cross-border trade, producing a deficit in the first half of 1955. The Times reported that Spain's threat of an economic blockade had also upset the government's calculations over its tobacco and coffee duties. The Colonial Office's report for the period records that customs receipts, exceptionally buoyant early in 1954, fell away sharply thereafter, and that the government had already raised import-duty and estate-duty rates in 1954 before introducing the new ad valorem duty towards the middle of 1955.

== The Revenue Bill ==
On 26 July 1955 the Gibraltarian Financial Secretary, John Hayward, explained to the Executive Council a Revenue Bill he intended to take through the legislature the following morning. The bill provided for a 10% ad valorem import duty on a limited range of luxury goods—the Colonial Office's report for 1954–1955 lists mechanical lighters, motor vehicles and their parts, photographic cameras and cinematographic projectors, radio and wireless apparatus, razor blades, and watches and clocks—and was intended to offset the revenue deficit, which The Times reported as £30,000 in the budget estimates. The two AACR members of the Executive Council objected: Abraham Serfaty warned that the duty might drive trade to Tangier, while Joshua Hassan argued that mid-year taxation was unnecessary.

On 27 July Hayward introduced the bill to the Legislative Council, having obtained three dispensations from the Governor: to introduce it without notice, without first making it available to members, and to take it through all its stages in a single sitting. Hassan countered that the duty was a stop-gap that failed to address the underlying problem, and that the shortfall should be met from reserves and, in the longer term, in conjunction with the British government, since only Whitehall could bring pressure to bear on Spain. Isola protested that the Standing Finance Committee, of which he was a member, had not been informed—by convention the committee was consulted only on expenditure, not revenue—while John Alcantara declared that he would vote against the taxation while its cause, in his view a Foreign Office blunder over the frontier, went unremedied.

== Rejection and use of reserve powers ==
When the vote was taken, the government was defeated by six votes to four, so that even the Governor's casting vote could not have carried the measure. The outcome turned on Peter Russo, a nominated unofficial member appointed only in March 1955, who had not spoken during the debate and whose opposition became known only when he voted with the five elected members.

Redman, presiding, responded at once. Telling the Legislative Council that in the interests of good government the bill had to pass, he declared that in exercise of his reserve powers it would have effect as if the Council had passed it. He adjourned the meeting; the members who had voted against absented themselves from the afternoon sitting. At half past six that evening the Governor informed Lennox-Boyd of what he had done, explaining that immediate enactment was necessary to stop traders rushing imports through before the duty took effect. He then left Gibraltar for York to attend his regiment's bicentenary celebrations.

== Public reaction ==
The reaction on the Rock was sharp. The president of the Chamber of Commerce, A. C. Savignon, wrote to Bates condemning both the manner of the bill's passing and its likely effect on trade, warning that it would weaken Gibraltar against competing centres such as Tangier and Ceuta. The Gibraltar Post devoted a front-page editorial on 30 July to what it called "a triumph for authoritarianism", (Note: The quoted phrases are drawn from contemporary newspapers as reported by Garcia.) while the Commonwealth Party newspaper Vox called the Legislative Council a farce.

On 2 August a public demonstration was held. A crowd estimated at more than 3,500 gathered in John Mackintosh Square and marched to the Governor's residence; Hassan told the meeting that he did not deny the need for taxation but condemned the way it had been imposed. An orderly deputation headed by the four AACR elected members: Hassan, Alcantara, Albert Risso and Serfaty, delivered a letter of protest to the Deputy Governor, Brigadier Geoffrey Lucas. The letter, lodged within the seven days that the constitution allowed for such a protest, accused Redman of abusing his authority and asked Lennox-Boyd to revoke the measure or to advise the Queen to disallow it.

== Whitehall's response ==
Redman visited the Colonial Office on 11 August and was assured that there was no question of his being advised to reverse his decision. Officials of the Mediterranean Department, among them Douglas Smith and William Morris, took the view that the elected members had forced a trial of strength and that the Governor had been right to demonstrate where ultimate power lay. Privately, however, Whitehall was less impressed: in a confidential letter of 15 September, the Assistant Under-Secretary of State Sir John Martin told Redman that it had been an unfortunate incident so early in his term, and stressed that in future the Secretary of State should be told in advance if it seemed likely that reserve powers would be used.

The AACR received the official reply to its protest on 19 September. Lennox-Boyd declined to use his powers of revocation, held that the duty was a proper response to the fall in revenue, and undertook to review the colony's finances at the end of the year—but made no reference to the use of the reserve powers, concentrating instead on the merits of the tax.

== Resignations ==
Dissatisfied with London's response, all five elected members of the Legislative Council submitted a joint resignation of their seats on 30 September 1955, and Hassan and Serfaty resigned from the Executive Council, of which they were unofficial members, as well. They stated that the Governor had forced through a measure the legislature had rejected and that the terms of the Secretary of State's reply made continued membership untenable. For the members the dispute had become one of principle: they would not accept that a Governor might use his powers at will and without first consulting London. By waiting until they had exhausted every constitutional avenue before resigning, they could not be accused of acting rashly.

== Lennox-Boyd's visit and settlement ==
On 6 October The Times published a leading article on the affair. It accepted that Redman had undoubted constitutional authority to act and that the money had to be found somehow, but recalled that the 1950 constitution had until then worked in an atmosphere of mutual esteem between officials and elected members, and reported the elected members' contention that so small a deficit could have been carried over, given the substantial balance on general revenue the previous May. Noting that reserve powers had been scarcely resorted to in the years after the war, save in cases of extreme urgency or peculiar circumstance, and that their more frequent recent use had usually carried the tacit consent of the governed, the paper judged that the present case commanded no such assent and lacked comparable urgency, so that Redman appeared to have taken "a sledge-hammer to crack a nut". The same day the Colonial Office announced that Lennox-Boyd would visit Gibraltar that week.

Lennox-Boyd arrived on 8 October with a delegation that included Sir John Martin and the legal adviser A. R. Rushford. That evening he met the five former elected members together with Peter Russo, who had voted against the government but had not resigned; Hassan made clear that none of them would stand for re-election or take part in government until the working of the constitution was modified. At a second meeting the following evening, Lennox-Boyd told them that the Governor would in future be obliged to consult London before using his reserve powers, and proposed associating the Standing Finance Committee—which comprised all the unofficial members sitting with the Financial Secretary—more closely with financial policy. Extending the committee's remit to revenue, and not merely expenditure, was a significant advance that had not featured in any of the earlier correspondence, and which Garcia attributes to the strength of feeling the delegation encountered.

In a press communiqué issued on 10 October before leaving the Rock, Lennox-Boyd publicly endorsed Redman's actions but stated that, for the smooth working of the constitution, the responsibilities of the legislature's Finance Committee should be widened. In a statement of 11 October the former members explained that prior consultation of the committee on any taxation measure would allow differences to be aired and relayed to the Secretary of State. Their brief public statement concealed an informal understanding on future political reform reached with Lennox-Boyd.

== Constitutional reform proposals ==
Before Lennox-Boyd's departure the AACR presented him with a memorandum on constitutional reform, the details of which were made public a week later. It sought an elected majority in the legislature by transferring the two non-official nominated seats to elected members; the replacement of the Executive Council by a Council of Ministers, comprising the Governor as President, three officials and four ministers drawn from the elected members, one of them styled Chief Minister; a redefinition of the reserve powers so that they could not be used without the approval of the Executive Council; and the replacement of the Governor as President of the legislature by an independent Speaker. Lennox-Boyd had already told Hassan that the idea of an independent Speaker was a good one.

== Resolution ==
A by-election was called for 6 December 1955 to fill the five vacant seats, but no poll proved necessary and the five who had resigned were returned unopposed. (Note: Garcia gives the date of the by-election as 6 December 1955; the Colonial Report for 1954–1955 dates the unopposed return to November 1955.) Hassan and Serfaty, who had also resigned from the Executive Council, were subsequently reappointed to it. On 20 December Hayward presented the 1956 budget, in which the 10% duty introduced in July was reduced. (Note: Garcia gives the reduced rate as 8¾%. The contemporary Colonial Report for 1954–1955 instead lists the ad valorem rate at 8 1/3% (1s. 8d. in the pound).) Although the elected members hailed this as a victory, Garcia argues that the settlement resolved only one of the two questions at issue: it prevented a repetition of a Governor resorting to his reserve powers, but left the merits of the tax itself unaddressed.

== Significance ==
Garcia describes the crisis as important in two ways. Its immediate effect was to increase the voice of the elected members over revenue and to ensure that any planned use of reserve powers was referred to the Secretary of State. Its longer-term significance was greater: no Governor of Gibraltar has exercised the reserve powers since, and the episode spurred the Gibraltarians to press for the constitutional reforms that followed, which Garcia regards as largely the Colonial Office's adoption of the AACR blueprint. By the end of the decade the Legislative Council had gained a majority of elected members, and an independent Speaker had replaced the Governor as its president.
