= Tito Benady =

Gibraltarian historian (1930–2026)

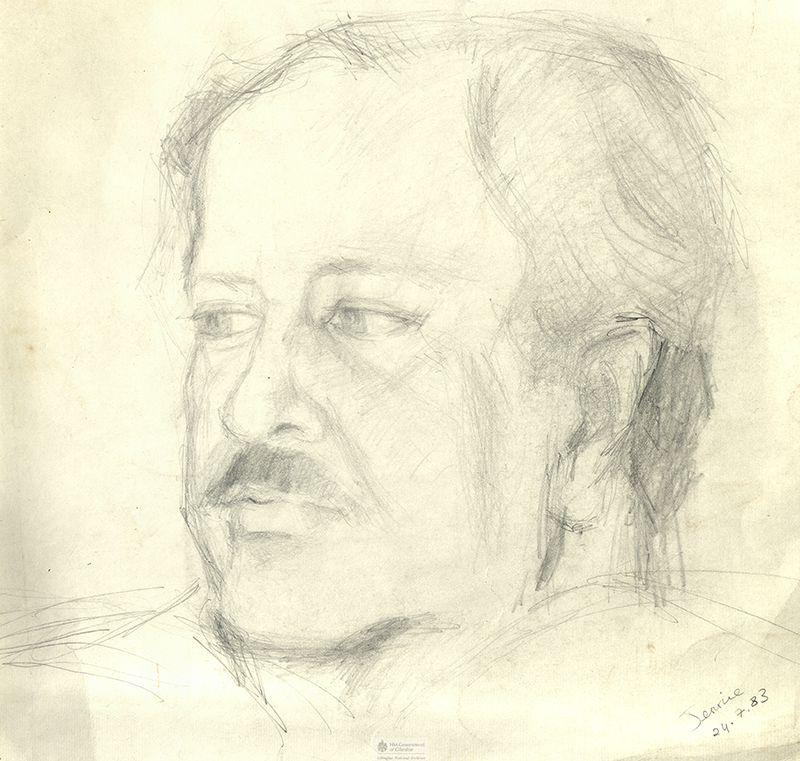
Portrait of Benady, 1983

Mesod Benady MBE (17 July 1930 – 19 May 2026) was a Gibraltarian historian of Sephardic Jewish descent. He lived in Grendon, Northamptonshire in the United Kingdom.

Benady was involved in local politics during the 1970s; he contested the 1976 election, as an independent, and in the 1980 election, as a candidate of the Party for the Autonomy of Gibraltar, led by Joseph Triay; he defended positions of rapprochement with Spain. In neither election was he successful.

He specialised in the local and military history of Gibraltar and also wrote about:

- Sephardic Jews in general;
- The Jewish communities in Gibraltar,
- Malta
- Menorca; and
- The Royal Navy.

In the 2001 New Year Honours he was appointed a Member of the Order of the British Empire (MBE), after a proposal by the Government of Gibraltar, for services to local history. In 1993 he founded a history journal published by the Gibraltar Heritage Trust. He was a Fellow of the Royal Historical Society, was one of the board members of the Friends of Gibraltar Heritage Society 1985–2013. Benady was elected "Consejero de Honor" of the Centro de Estudios Campogibraltareños (English: Centre for Campo de Gibraltar Studies) and ran the publishing house Gibraltar Books Ltd., specialising in books about Gibraltar. In 2025 he became Honorary Life President of the International Centre for Atlantic History (ICAH) based in Gibraltar.

Benady died on 19 May 2026, aged 95.

== Works ==
- The Settlement of Jews in Gibraltar, 1704-1783, Transactions, Jewish Historical Society of England 26 (1979)
- The Gibraltar police, 1830–1980 (Mediterranean Sun, 1980)
- The Jewish Community of Gibraltar, in Western Sephardim (Gibraltar Books, 1989)
- Guide to the Gibraltar Museum, ISBN 0-948466-10-3 (Ashford, Buchan & Enright, 1989)
- The Royal Navy at Gibraltar, ISBN 0-907771-49-1 (Maritime Press, Liskeard, 1992)
- Los menorquines en Gibraltar in Revista de Menorca (1992)
- Grendon in Northamptonshire, with Eileen Wilmin, ISBN 0-948466-34-0 (Gibraltar Books, 1994)
- The Streets of Gibraltar, ISBN 0-948466-37-5 (Gibraltar Books, 1996)
- The Convent at Gibraltar in Journal of the Society of Army Historical Research 77 (Summer 1999)
- Spaniards in Gibraltar in Gibtel Gibraltar Heritage Journal No 7, ISBN 0-9524808-5-9 (2000)
- The Settee Cut: Mediterranean Passes issued at Gibraltar in The Mariner's Mirror 87:3 (August 2001)
- Genoese in Gibraltar in Gibtel Gibraltar Heritage Journal No 8, ISBN 0-9524808-6-7 (2001)
- The Royal Navy at Gibraltar Since 1900, ISBN 978-1-904459-04-0 (Maritime Books, 2004)
- The Royal Gibraltar Police, with Cecilia Baldachino (Gibraltar Books, 2005)
- Trade and Contraband in Gibraltar in Eighteenth and Nineteenth Centuries’, Anglo-Saxons in the Mediterranean (Malta University Press 2007)
- "Essays on the History of Gibraltar" (Gibraltar Books 2014)
