= 1955 Gibraltar by-election =

By-election in Gibraltar following the 1955 constitutional crisis

- 6 December 1955 (Note: Garcia gives the date of the by-election as 6 December 1955; the Colonial Report for 1954–1955 instead dates the unopposed return to November 1955. The two dates are not necessarily inconsistent: the November date probably reflects the close of nominations, at which point the candidates would have been declared returned unopposed, while 6 December was the date on which a poll would otherwise have been held.)

All 5 elective seats on the Legislative Council (Note: The council had ten members in total: the five elected members together with five appointed members (three officials and two nominated unofficial members), with the Governor presiding as President and holding a casting vote.)
- Turnout: No poll held (Note: The five members who had resigned were the only candidates nominated for the five vacant seats and were returned unopposed, so no ballot took place.)
| | First party | Second party |
|---|---|---|
| Leader | Joshua Hassan |
| Party | AACR | Independents |
| Last election | 4 | 1 |
| Seats won | 4 | 1 |

A by-election to the Legislative Council was due to be held in Gibraltar on 6 December 1955 to fill the five elective seats left vacant by the resignation of the council's elected members during the 1955 Gibraltar constitutional crisis. The five who had resigned, four members of the Association for the Advancement of Civil Rights (AACR) and the independent Albert R. Isola, were the only candidates nominated for the five vacant seats, and all were returned unopposed in a walkover; the absence of a contest meant that no ballot was held.

== Background ==
The Legislative Council had been established in 1950, replacing the City Council as the territory's principal representative body. In 1955 it comprised five elected members and five appointed members, with the Governor presiding as President and holding a casting vote; the AACR, led by Joshua Hassan, held four of the five elected seats, the fifth being held by the independent Albert R. Isola. The elected members had last faced the electorate at the general election of November 1953.

In July 1955 the Governor, General Sir Harold Redman, used his reserve powers to bring into force a 10% ad valorem import duty that the Legislative Council had rejected by six votes to four. In protest, all five elected members resigned their seats on 30 September 1955, and the two AACR members of the Executive Council, Hassan and Serfaty, resigned from that body as well. The Secretary of State for the Colonies, Alan Lennox-Boyd, visited Gibraltar from 8 to 10 October and reached a settlement under which the Standing Finance Committee of the legislature would in future be consulted on revenue as well as expenditure, and the reserve powers would not be exercised again without prior reference to London. With that understanding secured, the former members agreed to return to public life.

== Electoral system ==
Five of the council's ten seats were filled by election for a three-year term. At contested elections the seats were filled by single transferable vote. Because only five candidates came forward for the five vacant seats, the method of counting did not come into play and the members were declared elected without a poll.

== Candidates ==
During Lennox-Boyd's visit, Hassan had made clear that none of the former members would stand for re-election or take part in government until the working of the constitution was modified. Following the settlement, all five offered themselves again for their seats: the AACR members Joshua Hassan, John Alcantara, Albert Risso and Abraham Serfaty, together with the independent Albert R. Isola. No other candidates were nominated for the five vacant seats.

== Result ==
With no other candidates standing, the five former members were returned unopposed and no poll took place. Hassan and Serfaty, who had also resigned from the Executive Council, were subsequently reappointed to it.

== Aftermath ==
On 20 December 1955 the Financial Secretary, John Hayward, presented the 1956 budget, in which the 10% import duty introduced in July was reduced. (Note: Garcia gives the reduced rate as 8¾%. The contemporary Colonial Report for 1954–1955 instead lists the ad valorem rate at 8 1/3% (1s. 8d. in the pound).) Although the elected members hailed this as a victory, the historian Joseph Garcia argues that the settlement resolved only one of the two questions at issue, preventing a repetition of a Governor resorting to his reserve powers but leaving the merits of the tax itself unaddressed.

The members returned by the by-election served until the following year, when the seats were next contested at the general election of 21 September 1956, at which the number of elected seats was expanded from five to seven. No Governor of Gibraltar has exercised the reserve powers since the 1955 crisis, and the episode gave impetus to the constitutional reforms of the following years.
