= Gibraltar Post =

English-language newspaper in Gibraltar

The Gibraltar Post was an English-language newspaper published in Gibraltar. The demise of the Gibraltar Guardian has been blamed on competition from local Spanish newspapers, and the Post very likely had a similar fate.
