= Doves (Gibraltar) =

Pseudonym of a group of political advocates

"The Doves" (Spanish: "Los Palomos") was the pseudonym under which a group of six Gibraltarian lawyers and businessmen published a letter on 15 March 1968 in the Gibraltar Chronicle advocating a political settlement with Spain to solve the disputed status of Gibraltar.

Among the six members of the group were Joseph Triay, Juan Triay and José Lázaro Coll.

== Proposals ==
The following day, the members of the Legislative Council challenged "The Doves" to produce specific proposals. A further letter was published on 4 April setting out proposals claimed to be acceptable for Spain:

- Recognition of the Gibraltarians as the legitimate inhabitants of Gibraltar.
- The interests of the United Kingdom in Gibraltar (either relating to defence or other issues) would be negotiated between the United Kingdom and Spain in order not to constitute an obstacle to a negotiated solution to the Anglo-Spanish conflict.
- Granting Gibraltar a constitution giving it complete and total autonomy.
- Raising the Spanish and Gibraltar flags alongside the Union flag.

== Public reaction ==
It was also made public that they had met with Spain's Foreign Affairs officials (a meeting was even held with the Spanish Foreign Affairs Minister, Fernando Castiella in March) to try to bring this about. However, this provoked widespread public hostility in Gibraltar towards The Doves. On 6 April an estimated crowd of around 1,000 people rioted and attacked their properties and homes. Rioting only finished in the afternoon, when Governor Sir Gerald Lathbury called for troops to support the Gibraltar Police, who had lost control by then. Twenty-two police officers were injured, but none were seriously hurt. Besides, the British Foreign Office and Police pried into the bank accounts of both Joseph and Juan Triay in London, Gibraltar and Madrid.

The term is often used derogatorily nowadays to refer to individuals whose ideals are comparable to those of The Doves.
