= 1921 Gibraltar City Council election =

First municipal election in Gibraltar

- 1 December 1921

All 4 elective seats on the City Council of Gibraltar (Note: The council had nine members in total: the four elected councillors plus five non-elective members, comprising three nominated by the Governor to represent the Government of Gibraltar, the Lords Commissioners of the Admiralty and the Principal Secretary of State for War, and two others appointed by the Governor.)
- Registered: 4,265
- Turnout: 70.3%
	First party
Party	Independent
Seats won	4
Popular vote	2,997
Percentage	100%
Chairman
James Andrews-Speed
Independent

The 1921 Gibraltar City Council election was held in Gibraltar on 1 December 1921 to elect four members of the newly created City Council of Gibraltar. It was the first occasion on which the civilian inhabitants of Gibraltar were able to elect representatives to a local governing body.

The council was established under the City Council Ordinance 1921, enacted on 22 August 1921 by the Governor, Sir Horace Smith-Dorrien, and brought into force on 1 October 1921. Its stated purpose was to provide "for the better representation of the civil population in regard to municipal affairs and business". The ordinance replaced the Board of Sanitary Commissioners, which ceased to exist on 1 December 1921. Of the council's nine members, four were elected by the electors of Gibraltar and five were nominated or appointed by the Governor, giving the official and appointed members a majority.

== Background ==
As a garrison colony, Gibraltar had for most of its history been governed directly by a Crown-appointed Governor, who was also the General Officer Commanding the garrison and who exercised all functions of government and legislation himself; there was no executive council or legislative body. A measure of civil administration had begun in 1865 with the appointment of local Sanitary Commissioners to improve public health conditions.

Immediately before the creation of the City Council, municipal affairs (the management of drainage, water supply and sanitation) were in the hands of the Sanitary Commissioners of Gibraltar, a body constituted under the Public Health Ordinance, 1907. It was a wholly nominated body whose members were appointed by the Governor; it was expressly "not an elected body" and there was accordingly no political franchise. The Commissioners levied a General Sanitary Purposes Rate of 3s 6d in the pound on the rateable value of immovable property. In 1920 the Commission was chaired by A. C. Greenwood, the Colonial Treasurer, and its members included the Director of Public Works J. R. Crook, Surgeon Captain A. Maclean and James Andrews-Speed.

Following Gibraltar's role during the First World War, the City Council was created in 1921 as a reward for the colony's wartime services, replacing the Sanitary Commissioners and taking over the management of drainage, water supply, sanitation and related municipal matters. Under the City Council Ordinance, the Board of Sanitary Commissioners ceased to exist on 1 December 1921 and its powers, duties, property and liabilities were transferred to the new council; references to the Commissioners in earlier ordinances were thereafter to be read as references to the City Council. The ordinance also repealed the provisions of the Public Health Ordinance, 1907 that had constituted the Commissioners. The new council raised the rate to 4s 6d in the pound. Several members of the former Commission carried over to the new council: Greenwood and Crook became appointed members, Maclean a nominated member, and Andrews-Speed, previously an appointed Commissioner, was returned as an elected member and became the council's first chairman. The 1921 census recorded a civil population of 16,753 (8,071 males and 8,682 females).

The scope of the new council and the method of choosing its members were contested while the ordinance was being drafted. In the summer of 1921 the Governor, Sir Horace Smith-Dorrien, appointed a committee to prepare the council's constitution, chaired by the Colonial Secretary (who held the casting vote) and including two local notables and two representatives of the local Workers' Union, which became part of the Transport and General Workers' Union in the early 1920s. The committee's draft proposed four elected and five nominated members and a £30 property qualification for candidates; the union representatives objected to both, arguing for an elected majority and against a qualification they regarded as confining candidacy to wealthier residents. Following a public rally at the Theatre Royal in June 1921 and a subsequent dispute in the Gibraltar Chronicle, Smith-Dorrien ensured that the ordinance contained no property qualification for candidates, although the nominated majority was retained.

== Electoral system ==
The composition of the council and the conduct of the election were governed by the City Council Ordinance 1921. The council consisted of nine members: three councillors nominated by the Governor to represent, respectively, the Government of Gibraltar, the Lords Commissioners of the Admiralty and the Principal Secretary of State for War; two councillors appointed by the Governor at each regular election; and four councillors elected by the electors. The five nominated and appointed members thus outnumbered the four elected members. No woman was eligible to hold the office of councillor. Both elected and appointed councillors served three-year terms.

For the purpose of the election, Gibraltar was divided into four wards: Old Town, Castle, Cathedral and Europa, as set out in the first schedule to the ordinance, each ward electing and returning one councillor. The schedule defined the wards by reference to the colony's police districts and detailed street boundaries; the Old Town, Castle and Cathedral wards covered the built-up town, while the Europa Ward extended southwards over the rest of the peninsula, including the Rosia, Naval Hospital, Buena Vista and Windmill Hill areas.

=== Franchise ===
Under section 15 of the ordinance, a person was entitled to be registered as an elector if he was a British subject of full age (21 years), not under any legal incapacity, not in arrears on his rates, and had for at least six months in the year the register was prepared occupied land or premises in Gibraltar as owner or tenant; "tenant" included a person occupying a room or rooms as a lodger. The ordinance expressly provided that no woman was entitled to be registered as an elector, and that no member of the Naval or Military Forces or civil servant of the Crown occupying a Crown residence or quarters free of rent could register in respect of that occupation. The exclusion of women contrasted with the United Kingdom, where a female franchise had been introduced in 1918.

A register of electors was to be prepared during 1921 and every third year thereafter, published by 1 October, under a Registration Officer appointed by the Governor; appeals against registration decisions lay to the Police Magistrate and, on a point of law, to the Supreme Court. At this first election an elector could vote only for the candidate standing in the ward in which he resided; voting in all four wards was introduced by an amending ordinance in 1927.

=== Qualification of candidates ===
To qualify for election a candidate had to be a British subject by birth and of full age (21 years), a resident of Gibraltar occupying a dwelling house (or part of one) for at least eight months a year, and able to read and write English; a prescribed statutory declaration to this effect, sworn before a Justice of the Peace, was set out in the second schedule to the ordinance. Undischarged bankrupts and persons convicted of a felony or sentenced to more than three months' imprisonment were disqualified.

== Candidates ==
Every candidate had to notify the returning officer in writing at least 21 days before the poll, supported by the sworn declaration, and could appoint an election agent; the Registration Officer acted as Returning Officer. Where only one candidate came forward in a ward, he was declared elected unopposed, and where more than one stood a poll was held. Because a poll was held in each of the four wards, more than one candidate stood in every ward. Candidates supported by the local Workers' Union stood in the election, their campaign benefiting from the union's organisation.

== Ward results ==
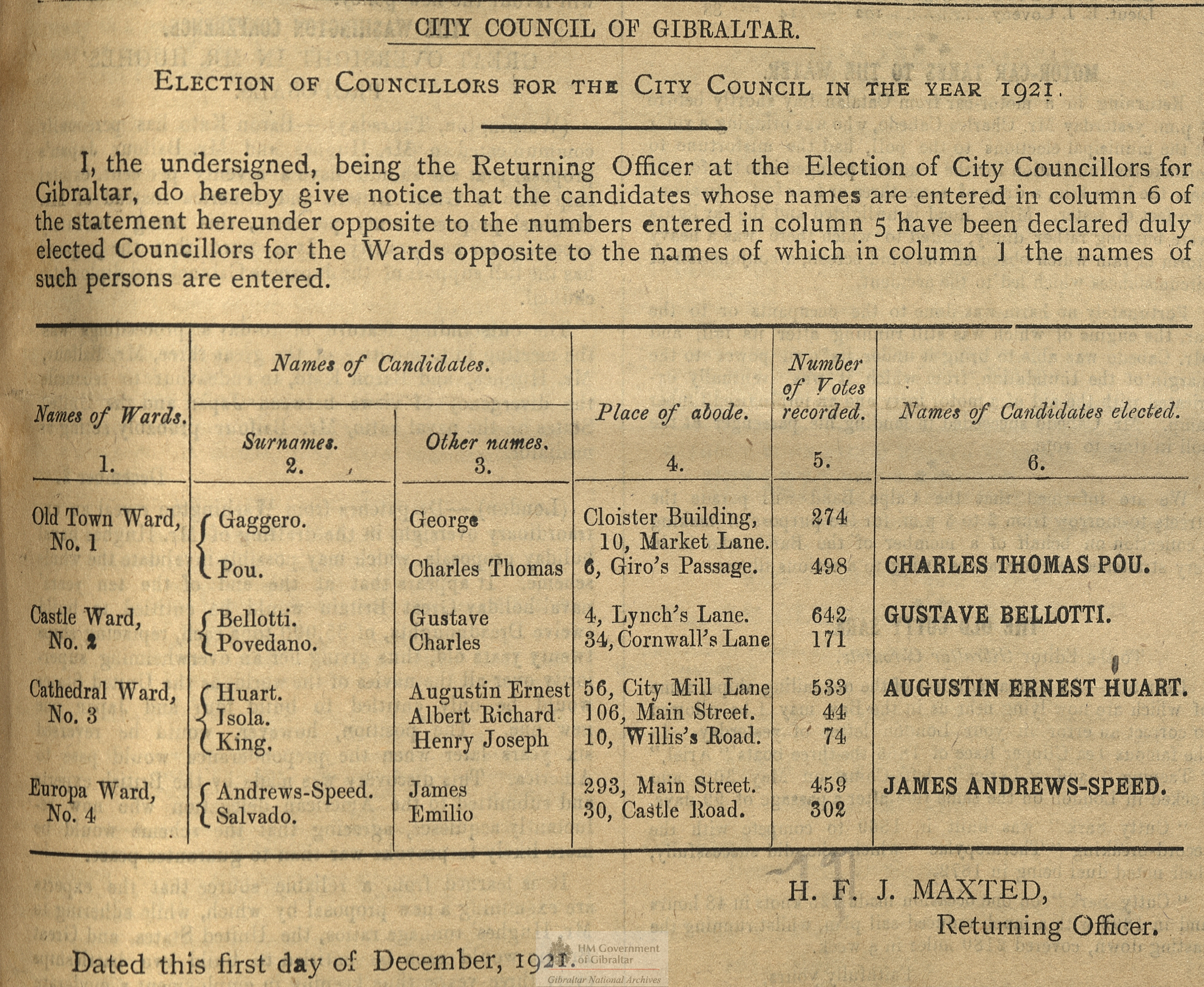
Official notice of the 1921 City Council of Gibraltar election results, signed by Returning Officer H. F. J. Maxted

A total of 4,265 electors were on the register, and 2,997 valid votes were recorded across the four wards. The Colonial Office's report for 1921 put turnout at nearly 75% despite heavy rain, while the votes recorded in the Blue Book represent about 70% of the register. Candidates supported by the Workers' Union were reported to have won three of the four wards, a result attributed to the union's organisation. A later account states that all four elected seats went to union-backed candidates. The outcome was regarded as a success for the union, and none of the candidates put forward by the Exchange Committee and the Chamber of Commerce were elected. The four members returned were James Andrews-Speed (who became chairman), G. Bellotti, A. E. Huart and C. T. Pou.

=== Old Town Ward ===
Old Town Ward, No. 1 (1 seat)
Party	Candidate	Votes	%	±%
Independent	Charles Thomas Pou	498	64.5	
Independent	George Gaggero	274	35.5	
Turnout		772		
Independent win (new seat)				

=== Castle Ward ===
Castle Ward, No. 2 (1 seat)
Party	Candidate	Votes	%	±%
Independent	Gustave Bellotti	642	79.0	
Independent	Charles Povedano	171	21.0	
Turnout		813		
Independent win (new seat)				

=== Cathedral Ward ===
Cathedral Ward, No. 3 (1 seat)
Party	Candidate	Votes	%	±%
Independent	Augustin Ernest Huart	533	81.9	
Independent	Henry Joseph King	74	11.4	
Independent	Albert Richard Isola	44	6.8	
Turnout		651		
Independent win (new seat)				

=== Europa Ward ===
Europa Ward, No. 4 (1 seat)
Party	Candidate	Votes	%	±%
Independent	James Andrews-Speed	459	60.3	
Independent	Emilio Salvadó	302	39.7	
Turnout		761		
Independent win (new seat)				

== Council composition ==
Following the election, the council was composed as follows:

Members of the City Council of Gibraltar, 1921
Governor
Sir Horace Smith-Dorrien
Nominated by the Governor
Name	Role
J. R. Crook, OBE, JP	Representative of the Government of Gibraltar; Director of Public Works
Surgeon Captain A. Maclean, DSO, MB, RN	Representative of the Lords Commissioners of the Admiralty
Major H. E. Cond, AMICE	Representative of the Principal Secretary of State for War
Appointed by the Governor
G. Gaggero
A. C. Greenwood, OBE, JP
Elected by the electors
Name	Role
James Andrews-Speed, JP	Chairman of the City Council of Gibraltar; Councillor for Europa Ward
G. Bellotti	Councillor for Castle Ward
A. E. Huart	Councillor for Cathedral Ward
C. T. Pou	Councillor for Old Town Ward

== Aftermath ==
James Andrews-Speed became the council's first chairman; the council was presided over by a chairman rather than a mayor, and Gibraltar was not incorporated as a borough nor were any aldermen created.

Contemporaries recognised the limits of the reform. The franchise remained confined to ratepayers, the elected councillors were a minority, and the council's authority extended only to the levying of rates for sanitary and municipal purposes; Gibraltar still had neither an executive council nor a legislature, and the Governor continued to exercise all governmental and legislative functions himself. At the annual general meeting of the Exchange on 24 January 1922, Dr P. F. Lyon welcomed the council but expressed the hope that Gibraltarians would in time assume full control of local affairs, attributing the absence of further progress to a lack of understanding among the authorities in England.

Constitutional change continued the following year. In October 1922 an Executive Council was established, comprising four ex-officio members and three unofficial members appointed by the Governor; its role was purely advisory, and the Governor retained full legislative, administrative and executive powers. James Andrews-Speed, the council's elected chairman, was among the three unofficial members appointed to it. When the Workers' Union asked Smith-Dorrien's successor, Sir Charles Monro, to appoint a Labour representative to the Executive Council on the ground that it did not represent all sections of the community, Monro rejected the request, characterising such claims as "hardly compatible with the existence of Gibraltar as a Military Fortress". Demands for wider representation continued, and in February 1926 Monro rejected a call for a majority of elected members on the City Council.

The City Council continued to operate, with a period of suspension during the Second World War, until it was abolished in 1969, when it was merged with the Legislative Council to form the Gibraltar House of Assembly. Later commentators have described the 1921 election as the first step towards self-government for the people of Gibraltar.
