= 1950 Gibraltar general election =

First elections to the Gibraltar Legislative Council

- 8 November 1950
- All 5 elective seats in the Legislative Council (Note: The other six seats on the eleven-member Council were not elected: the Governor sat as President, three members served ex officio (the Colonial Secretary, the Attorney-General and the Financial Secretary), and two were nominated by the Governor.)
- Turnout: 53.18%
Party	Leader	Vote %	Seats
AACR	Joshua Hassan	46.10	3
Independents	–	46.24	2
This lists parties that won seats. See the complete results below.

General elections were held in Gibraltar on 8 November 1950 (Note: The poll was held on 8 November 1950, a Wednesday, and the results were declared the following day, Thursday 9 November. The polling date is given by the Gibraltar Chronicle, the Colonial Office report and Garcia, while the Gibraltar Chronicle report and the Gibraltar newspaper El Calpense are both dated 9 November 1950, the latter referring to the voting of the previous day; the official poll-results sheet published by the Gibraltar Parliament is headed with the later, declaration date.) to elect five members of the newly created Legislative Council, the first time the colony's legislature contained directly elected members. Nine candidates contested the five elective seats. The Association for the Advancement of Civil Rights (AACR), led by Joshua Hassan, emerged as the largest party in the new legislature, winning three of the five elected seats, with the remaining two taken by independents. The new Legislative Council was inaugurated by the Duke of Edinburgh on 23 November 1950. The election was the first of any kind in Gibraltar in which women were entitled to vote.

== Background ==
Before 1950, legislative power in the Crown colony of Gibraltar was exercised by the Governor in Council, and there was no elected legislature. The Legislative Council was established in 1950 with a partly elected membership. The Gibraltar (Legislative Council) Order in Council came into effect on 3 February 1950, and the first elections were held the following November. It did not replace the existing Gibraltar City Council, which continued to administer municipal affairs; the two bodies ran in parallel until they were merged to form the House of Assembly in 1969. A separate election for the seven elective seats on the 13-member City Council was held a month later, on 6 December 1950.

The choice of proportional representation for the elected seats was politically motivated. The Association for the Advancement of Civil Rights (AACR), which had led the campaign for constitutional reform, was expected to win all five elected seats under any other system, since its supporters formed a majority of the electorate while its opponents were divided. The Governor, Sir Kenneth Anderson, pressed the Colonial Office to adopt proportional representation for that reason, and officials in London privately regarded the system as a means of splitting the AACR vote rather than as a fairer method of election.

== Electoral system ==
The elections were regulated by the Elections Ordinance, 1950 (No. 15 of 1950). As inaugurated in November 1950, the Legislative Council consisted of the Governor as President, three ex officio members (the Colonial Secretary, the Attorney-General and the Financial Secretary), two members nominated by the Governor (of whom at least one had to be unofficial), and five elected unofficial members. Nominated and elected members normally retained their seats until the dissolution of the Council, which took place at least every three years.

The five elected seats were filled by proportional representation using the single transferable vote. The franchise was exercisable by all adult British subjects and citizens of the Republic of Ireland who had been ordinarily resident in Gibraltar for a continuous period of twelve months ending on the qualifying date; members of the Armed Forces not domiciled in Gibraltar were excluded. Women had been enfranchised three years earlier, and the election was the first of any kind in Gibraltar in which they were able to vote. The proportional system used for the Legislative Council was not applied to elections for the City Council.

== Campaign ==
The AACR fielded four candidates rather than five, one prospective candidate having been obliged to withdraw by his employers. Its slate comprised Joshua Hassan, chairman of the City Council since 1945 and AACR president since 1948; Albert Risso, president of the Gibraltar Confederation of Labour, the territory's largest trade union; the architect Abraham Serfaty, a city councillor since March 1950; and Francis Panayotti, a chartered secretary with no political record. The AACR campaigned against proportional representation and reminded voters that the elected members would form only a minority in a council whose powers were limited.

Of the remaining candidates, Agustin Huart and R. H. Bianchi were sponsored by the Transport and General Workers' Union, while Louis Bruzon, who had resigned from the AACR and the City Council in January 1950, stood as a former AACR member. Major Joseph Patron and Albert R. Isola, both right-leaning independents who had previously served on the Executive Council, completed the field of nine. Isola, a barrister, entered the contest only at the last minute.

== Results ==
The Association for the Advancement of Civil Rights won three of the five seats and independents the other two; a total of 7,214 ballots were cast from an electorate of 13,564, a turnout of about 53%.

Party	First preferences	%	Seats
Association for the Advancement of Civil Rights	3,250	46.10	3
Transport and General Workers' Union Gibraltar	540	7.66	0
Independents	3,260	46.24	2
Total	7,050	100.00	5
Valid votes	7,050	97.73	
Invalid/blank votes	164	2.27	
Total votes	7,214	100.00	
Registered voters/turnout	13,564	53.18	
Source: Garcia, Gibraltar Chronicle, Gibraltar Parliament

=== By candidate ===
The quota for election was 1,176 votes. Isola was the only candidate to exceed the quota on the first count; his surplus was distributed at the second count, at which Panayotti also reached the quota. After the three lowest-placed candidates were eliminated following the third count, Risso, Hassan and Patron passed the quota at the fourth count and were elected. The order in which candidates were declared elected is given in brackets, and 276 votes were non-transferable by the final count.

Candidate	Party	First preferences		Subsequent counts		
Candidate	Party	First preferences		2	3	4
A. R. Isola (1)	Independent	2,022	28.68	1,176	1,176	1,176
F. Panayotti (2)	AACR	1,058	15.01	1,256	1,176	1,176
A. Risso (3)	AACR	1,112	15.77	1,140	1,159	1,248
J. A. Hassan (4)	AACR	1,009	14.31	1,100	1,121	1,208
J. Patron (5)	Independent	567	8.04	966	992	1,099
L. Bruzon	Independent	671	9.52	759	769	867
A. Huart	TGWU	434	6.16	459	461	0
R. H. Bianchi	TGWU	106	1.50	115	115	0
A. Serfaty	AACR	71	1.01	79	81	0
Non-transferable votes			–	0	0	276
Total		7,050	100.00	7,050	7,050	7,050
Valid votes		7,050	97.73			
Invalid votes		164	2.27			
Total votes		7,214	100.00			
Registered voters/turnout		13,564	53.18			
Source: Parliament of Gibraltar, Garcia

Colonial officials had expected the AACR leaders to head the poll, but Albert R. Isola, a barrister standing as an independent, topped it, relegating Risso and Hassan to third and fourth places. Elected on the first count, Isola was described by the Gibraltar Chronicle as the first Gibraltarian to be returned to the legislature. The result returned three left-wing and two right-wing members, an outcome seen within the Colonial Office as producing the split that proportional representation had been intended to achieve.

== Aftermath ==
Alongside the elected members, the first Legislative Council was presided over by the Governor, General Sir Kenneth Anderson. Its three ex officio members were the Colonial Secretary, B. J. O'Brien; the Attorney-General, C. C. Ross; and the Financial Secretary, A. E. Cook. The two members nominated by the Governor on 16 November 1950 were Henry Coelho, a sub-manager of Barclays Bank in Gibraltar, who sat as an unofficial member, and John Hayward, the Colonial Postmaster, an official; both were Gibraltarians. E. H. Davis was the Clerk of the Council.

The Council was inaugurated by the Duke of Edinburgh at 11 a.m. on 23 November 1950, with the Governor as its first President. On 12 December it was announced that Isola, Coelho and Risso had been appointed to the Executive Council, which comprised four ex officio and three unofficial members appointed by the Governor. The new Legislative Council held its first business meeting on 16 December 1950.

In the City Council election held on 6 December 1950, the first contested poll for that body since 1945, turnout was only about 35%. Four AACR candidates and seven independents contested the seven seats; the AACR, again headed by Hassan, won four and independents took three. The City Council continued to administer municipal affairs alongside the new legislature.
