= Elections Rules (Gibraltar) =

Subsidiary electoral legislation of Gibraltar

- Long title: Rules regulating the registration of voters and the conduct of elections in Gibraltar
- Citation: 1950.07.20-1
- Territorial extent: Gibraltar
- Commenced: 20 July 1950

Amended by
- Elections (Amendment) Rules 2023 and others

Related legislation
- Parliament Act (Act No. 1950-15)
- Status: In force

The Elections Rules (legislative reference 1950.07.20-1) are the subsidiary legislation of Gibraltar that set out the detailed procedure for the conduct of elections to the Gibraltar Parliament. They are made under section 25 of the Parliament Act (Act No. 1950-15), the principal electoral statute, and supplement it by prescribing matters of electoral procedure and the statutory forms used at an election.

The elections machinery of Gibraltar is divided between the parent Act and these rules: the Parliament Act deals with the franchise, election offences and election petitions, while the Elections Rules govern the practical conduct of the poll.

== Origin and title ==
The rules were first made on 20 July 1950 as the Election Rules, 1950, alongside the establishment of the Legislative Council under the Gibraltar (Legislative Council) Order in Council. When first made they were subsidiary to the parent statute as it was then titled, the Elections Ordinance, 1950 (No. 15 of 1950). As the parent Act was renamed, in turn, the House of Assembly Act following the Gibraltar Constitution Order 1969 and the Parliament Act following the Gibraltar Constitution Order 2006, the rules became the Elections Rules, the title under which they appear in the consolidated Laws of Gibraltar.

== Content ==
Section 25 of the Parliament Act empowers the Minister with responsibility for elections to make rules regulating, among other things, the forms to be used, the registration of voters, and the conduct of elections, including provision for postal and other absentee voting. The Elections Rules implement that power. Their provisions include the election timetable and the computation of time, the hours of the poll, the notice of election, the nomination and withdrawal of candidates and the deposit required, the method of election, the taking of the poll by ballot, the form and marking of ballot papers, the provision and equipment of polling stations, the appointment of presiding officers and clerks, the appointment of polling and counting agents, the procedure for voting (including provision for blind voters), the maintenance of order and secrecy, and the counting of votes.

The rules also prescribe the statutory forms used at an election, such as the notice of election, the nomination paper and the ballot paper for Gibraltar Parliament elections.

== Related subsidiary legislation ==
The Elections Rules are one of several instruments made under the Parliament Act. A companion instrument, the Electors (Registration) Rules (1950.07.20-2), formerly governed the registration of electors; it was repealed on 31 January 2019 and replaced by the Electors Registration Rules 2019 (LN 2019/021). Provision for absentee voting is made by the Postal Voting (Procedure) Rules (LN 1983/067, in force 1 August 1983) and the Proxy Voting (Procedure) Rules 2019 (LN 2019/023).

== Amendments ==
The rules, first made in 1950, have been amended on several occasions:

Year	Amending instrument	Commencement
1987	Elections (Amendment) Rules, 1987 (LN 1987/147)	5 November 1987
2007	Elections (Amendment) Rules 2007 (LN 2007/114)	20 September 2007
2019	Elections (Amendment) Rules 2019 (LN 2019/020)	31 January 2019
2023	Elections (Amendment) Rules 2023 (LN 2023/267)	13 September 2023

== See also ==
- Parliament Act (Gibraltar)
- Elections in Gibraltar
- Gibraltar Parliament
- Constitution of Gibraltar
