= City Council Ordinance 1921 =

1921 law establishing the City Council of Gibraltar

City Council Ordinance, 1921

Governor of Gibraltar
- Long title: An Ordinance to constitute a City Council and to provide for the conduct of elections
- Citation: No. 10 of 1921
- Territorial extent: Gibraltar
- Enacted by: Sir Horace Smith-Dorrien, Governor of Gibraltar
- Enacted: 22 August 1921
- Commenced: 1 October 1921

Repeals
- Public Health Ordinance, 1907 (ss. 2, 3–18, 21)

Amended by
- Ordinance No. 4 of 1927; Ordinance No. 18 of 1947 (as the City Council (Constitution and Powers) Ordinance)
- Status: Repealed

The City Council Ordinance, 1921 (No. 10 of 1921) was an ordinance of Gibraltar that constituted the Council of the City of Gibraltar and provided for the conduct of its elections. Enacted by the Governor of Gibraltar, Sir Horace Smith-Dorrien, on 22 August 1921 and brought into force on 1 October 1921, it replaced the appointed Board of Sanitary Commissioners with a partly elected municipal body and provided for the first public elections held in Gibraltar, on 1 December 1921. Its long title was An Ordinance to constitute a City Council and to provide for the conduct of elections, and its preamble recited that it was desirable to provide for the better representation of the civil population in municipal affairs and business.

The ordinance established a Council of nine members, five nominated or appointed by the governor and four elected by the ratepayers of the town, and set out in detail the qualification of councillors and electors, the division of the town into wards, and the machinery of registration, balloting and the prevention of corrupt practices. It was amended on several occasions, notably in 1927 and 1947, and the Council it created was reconstituted with an elected majority in 1945 before being abolished in 1969 by the Gibraltar Constitution Order 1969.

== Background ==
The Board of Sanitary Commissioners, an appointed body created in 1865 to administer the town's public health and water supply, had no popularly elected members, and successive Secretaries of State held that Gibraltar's status as a military fortress made a government majority on any local body essential. Demands for wider representation revived after the First World War. In 1919 a deputation from the Gibraltar British Workmen's Association pressed the Secretary of State for representation on a ratepayer franchise, and the Secretary of State accepted for the first time that the non-official members of a local body might be elected, while continuing to insist on an official majority.

In the summer of 1921 Smith-Dorrien appointed a committee to draft the new council's constitution, chaired by the colonial secretary and including two local notables and two representatives of the local Workers' Union. The committee's draft proposed four elected to five nominated members and a £30 property qualification for candidates; the union representatives objected to both, arguing for an elected majority and against any property qualification. After a public rally at the Theatre Royal in June 1921 and a subsequent dispute in the Gibraltar Chronicle, the ordinance as enacted contained no property qualification for candidates, although the nominated majority was retained.

== Passage ==
The ordinance was enacted by the governor, Sir Horace Smith-Dorrien, and passed on 22 August 1921, the enacting words reciting that it was made "by His Excellency the Governor of the City and Garrison of Gibraltar". It was authenticated "by Command" of the colonial secretary, C. W. J. Orr. By section 1 the ordinance was to come into force on 1 October 1921, while the transfer of functions from the Board of Sanitary Commissioners and the repeals effected by the ordinance took effect from 1 December 1921, the date of the first elections.

== Provisions ==
The ordinance was divided into three parts, followed by seven schedules:

=== Part I: Constitution of the Council ===
Part I (sections 1–18) constituted the Council and dealt with its membership and the registration of electors. Section 2 established the City Council as a corporate body with a common seal, able to sue and be sued in its corporate capacity, constituted from the date of the first election. Under section 3 the Council was to consist of nine members: five nominated or appointed by the governor and four elected, with a proviso that no woman was eligible for the office of councillor. Of the nominated members, the governor was to nominate one to represent the Government of Gibraltar, one to represent the Lords Commissioners of the Admiralty and one to represent the Secretary of State for War, and to appoint two further councillors at each city council election; elected councillors served for a term of three years. Section 4 provided that the Board of Sanitary Commissioners should cease to exist from 1 December 1921 and that its powers, duties, property and liabilities should pass to the Council, references to the Commissioners in earlier ordinances being construed as references to the new Council.

Section 5 divided the town into four wards—Old Town, Castle, Cathedral and Europa—each returning one councillor, as set out in the First Schedule. Section 6 required a councillor to be a British subject by birth and of full age, resident in Gibraltar in actual occupation of a dwelling for at least eight months a year, and able to read and write English; section 7 disqualified undischarged bankrupts and persons convicted of a felony or sentenced to more than three months' imprisonment. Sections 8 to 13 provided penalties for unqualified persons acting or standing as councillors, required candidates to lodge a sworn declaration of qualification, and allowed candidates to appoint an election agent.

Sections 14 and 15 provided for a register of electors to be prepared in 1921 and every third year thereafter and defined the franchise: a person was entitled to be registered if a British subject of full age, not subject to legal incapacity and not in arrears of rates, who had occupied land or premises in Gibraltar as owner, tenant or lodger for at least six months. Two provisos excluded women and excluded members of the naval, military or civil service of the Crown in respect of quarters provided rent-free by the Crown. Section 16 provided a right of appeal against the Registration Officer's decisions to the police magistrate and, on a point of law, to the Supreme Court. Section 17 fixed the first elections for 1 December 1921 and subsequent city council elections for 1 December every third year, with provision for casual vacancies, and section 18 made the Registration Officer the Returning Officer.

=== Part II: Method of election ===
Part II (sections 19–45) prescribed the method of election. Voting was to be by secret ballot on papers bearing the candidates' names in alphabetical order of surname, numbered on the back with a matching numbered counterfoil (section 20). The part regulated the construction and sealing of ballot boxes, the marking of papers with an official mark, and the procedure to be followed by electors, including provision for voters who were blind, otherwise incapacitated or unable to read (sections 21–26). Further sections governed the counting of votes, the treatment of rejected and tendered papers, the sealing and retention of election documents by the colonial secretary, and restrictions on their subsequent inspection except under order of the Supreme Court (sections 27–34). Offences relating to ballot papers and boxes and the infringement of secrecy were made punishable by imprisonment (sections 35–36), and general provisions dealt with polling compartments, the oath of secrecy, the maintenance of order, and the striking-off of votes tainted by corrupt practices (sections 37–45).

=== Part III: Prevention of corrupt practices ===
Part III (sections 46–61) dealt with the prevention of corrupt practices, in provisions modelled on contemporary British electoral law. It defined and penalised bribery by both givers and receivers, the corrupt payment of rates or taxes, treating and undue influence, with pecuniary penalties recoverable by action in the Supreme Court (sections 47–56). Section 57 made personation a felony punishable by up to two years' imprisonment with hard labour, and section 58 disqualified a candidate found guilty of bribery, treating, undue influence or personation from being elected or sitting for five years. Section 61, read with the Seventh Schedule, repealed with effect from 1 December 1921 section 2 of the Public Health Ordinance, 1907, so far as it defined the expressions "Commissioners" and "Representative Commissioners", together with the whole of sections 3 to 18 inclusive and the whole of section 21 of that ordinance.

=== Schedules ===
The ordinance had seven schedules: a list of the four wards (Old Town, Castle, Cathedral and Europa) defined by police districts; a form of declaration to be made by candidates; registration rules governing the preparation of the electoral register and appeals; a form of ballot paper; a form of directions for the guidance of electors; a form of the oath of secrecy; and a schedule of repeals affecting the Public Health Ordinance, 1907.

== Amendment and repeal ==
The first elections under the ordinance were held on 1 December 1921, the first occasion on which public elections had taken place in Gibraltar; the franchise was limited to male ratepayers, and candidates supported by the Workers' Union won all four elected seats. In 1927 the ordinance was amended by Ordinance No. 4, which provided for the appointment of a vice-chairman and enabled every elector to vote for candidates in all four wards, rather than only in the ward of residence.

The Council was suspended during the Second World War, its functions being transferred to a single commissioner in 1940 and assumed by the governor in 1941. It was reconstituted with an elected majority of seven elected to six official members and elections were held in July 1945. The principal ordinance, by then cited as the City Council (Constitution and Powers) Ordinance, was amended in 1947 by Ordinance No. 18, which for the first time allowed women to vote and to stand for election. The Council was abolished in 1969, when the Gibraltar Constitution Order 1969 came into force and its functions were merged with those of the Legislative Council to form the House of Assembly.

== See also ==
- City Council of Gibraltar
- Elections in Gibraltar
- Gibraltar Constitution Order 1969
