= Joseph Triay =

Gibraltarian lawyer and politician (1931–2012)

Joseph Triay QC
- Joseph Triay at his offices in Irish Town
- Born: Joseph Emmanuel Triay; 5 October 1931; Gibraltar
- Died: 3 July 2012 (aged 80); Gibraltar
- Other names: J.E. Triay; Jose Manuel Triay
- Education: Middle Temple
- Occupations: Barrister; Politician
- Organization: Triay & Triay
- Spouse: Patricia
- Parent: S.P. Triay QC
- Relatives: Peter Caruana (son-in-law)

Joseph Emmanuel Triay QC (5 October 1931 – 3 July 2012), commonly referred to as J. E. Triay, was a Gibraltarian lawyer and politician, best known for having been one of the promoters of the Doves in the 1960s.

Joseph Triay's daughter Cristina is married to Peter Caruana, former Chief Minister of Gibraltar.

== Education and legal career ==
Son to S.P. Triay QC, J.E. was born in Gibraltar in October 1931, and educated at an English boarding school. He was called to the Middle Temple and the bar in Gibraltar in 1952 and became Queen's Counsel in 1982. Following the sudden death of his father, J.E. and his brother, J.J. inherited their father's law firm later to become Triay & Triay.

== Political career and controversy ==
At the height of Franco's campaign against Gibraltar in his attempt to claim its sovereignty during the 1960s, J.E. was involved in great controversy when he, as one of the group calling themselves the Doves advocated a political settlement with Spain and made contact with the Spanish Government of the time. The Gibraltarian public reaction was to revolt, bringing about the worst and most violent riot in its recent history. The Triay & Triay chambers were ransacked and J.E. suffered a petrol bomb attack to his home shortly after the publication of a letter advocating such political settlement. His family were inside while the attack took place but no-one was harmed. His yacht, the Patricia E, was the subject of an arson attack a few months later.

Triay was involved in local politics during the 1970s. He stood for the 1976 election, as an independent, and in the 1980 election, as leader of the Party for the Autonomy of Gibraltar. He later concentrated on his law practice and never spoke again publicly about politics.

== Death ==
Triay died on 3 July 2012, aged 80.
