= Commonwealth Party (Gibraltar) =

- Leader: Juan Jose Triay
- Founded: 1953; 72 years ago
- Dissolved: 1957; 68 years ago

The Commonwealth Party was a political party in Gibraltar. It was the second party to contest an election after the Association for the Advancement of Civil Rights (AACR) and was led by Juan Jose Triay.

== History ==
The party was founded in 1953. It won a seat in the 1956 general elections, taken by Triay. In the elections to the City Council, three months later (on 5 December 1956) the Commonwealth Party got two out of ten seats, for Guy Stagnetto and Louis Bruzon (besides 5 for the AACR, and 3 independents).

However, in 1957 Triay resigned from the Legislative Council in protest at the silence adopted by the other members of the council on the Spanish visa restrictions issue. In the by-election, the Commonwealth Party candidate, Alfred Vasquez was not elected and the party disbanded.
