= City Council of Gibraltar =

Type
- Type: Municipal council

History
- Founded: 1 December 1921 (Note: The Colony's report for 1921 dates the replacement of the Board of Sanitary Commissioners by the new City Council to 1 December 1921, which was also the day of the first public elections. The Council's silver jubilee was nevertheless marked on 30 December 1946.)
- Disbanded: 30 May 1969 (Note: The Gibraltar Constitution Order 1969 came into force on 30 May 1969, merging the Council with the Legislative Council to form the House of Assembly; the Council met for the last time in August 1969.)
- Preceded by: Board of Sanitary Commissioners
- Succeeded by: Gibraltar House of Assembly

Leadership
- Chairman: James Andrews-Speed (first, 1921)
- Mayor: Joshua Hassan (first, 1955)

Structure
- Seats: 9 (1921–1945): 4 elected, 5 non-elected 13 (1945–1969): 7 elected, 6 non-elected (Note: The non-elected seats were filled by ex-officio members and by members appointed by the governor. In the original 1921 council the three nominated councillors represented the Government of Gibraltar, the Admiralty and the War Office; representation of the air force among the service members dates from the council's reconstitution after the Second World War. The chief medical officer sat ex officio throughout, and a second senior official did so until 1950. The number of councillors the governor appointed changed over time (four in 1945–1949, five from 1950, when the second ex-officio seat lapsed, and four again from 1956), so the precise balance of elected to non-elected members varied in the Council's later years.)
- Length of term: Three years (elected members)

Elections
- Voting system: Single-member wards; from 1927 electors voted in all four wards
- First election: 1 December 1921
- Last election: 1 December 1965

Meeting place
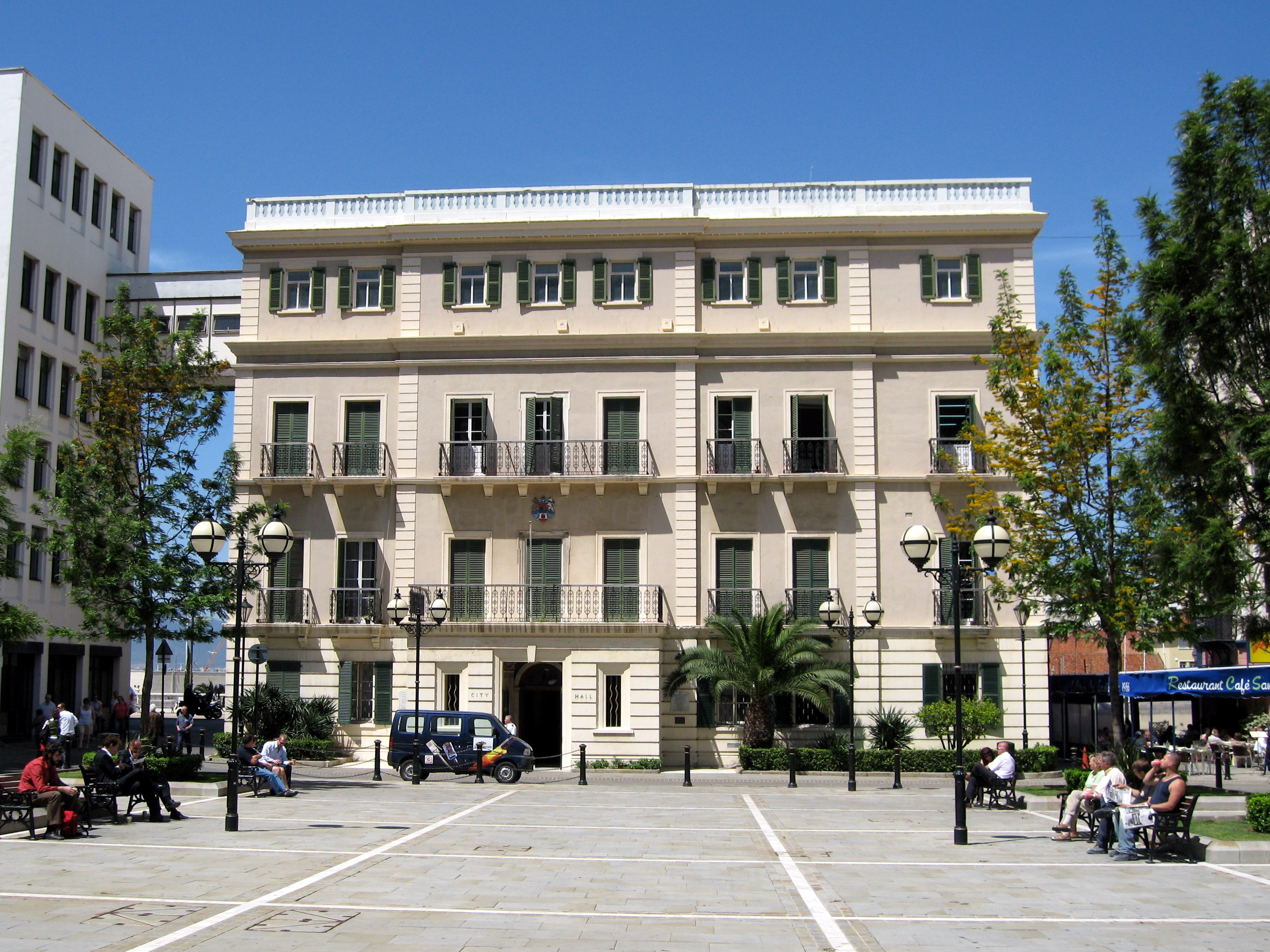
- Gibraltar City Hall, John Mackintosh Square

The Council of the City of Gibraltar (or City Council of Gibraltar) was the administrative and governing body of the City of Gibraltar from 1921 until 1969. The Council sat in the City Hall in John Mackintosh Square. On its abolition in 1969, its functions were merged with those of the Legislative Council to form the Gibraltar House of Assembly.

== Background ==
The City Council replaced the Board of Sanitary Commissioners, an appointed body created in 1865 to administer the town's public health and water supply. Its members were not popularly elected, and successive Secretaries of State held that Gibraltar's status as a military fortress made a government majority on any such body essential. Local ratepayers periodically pressed for wider representation, forming a Ratepayers' Defence Association in the 1890s and securing amending legislation in 1893, but the principle of an official majority was maintained.

Demands revived after the First World War. In 1919 a deputation from the Gibraltar British Workmen's Association asked the Secretary of State for the Colonies for representation on a popular franchise in matters such as rates and the water supply, while the Exchange Committee proposed an appointed consultative council to advise the governor. The Secretary of State, while continuing to insist on an official majority, accepted for the first time that the non-official members might be elected on a franchise of ratepayers, fewer than 4,000 people in a population of about 19,000 at that date. These discussions led to the City Council Ordinance 1921, the union's objection to the retained nominated majority being withdrawn on the understanding that an elected majority would follow once Gibraltarians had shown themselves able to exercise the responsibility.

== Creation and functions ==
The City Council was established in 1921 by the City Council Ordinance 1921, replacing the Board of Sanitary Commissioners, which had administered the town's public health and water supply since 1865. The new body took over the Commission's staff and premises. Its creation was regarded as recognition of the civilian population's role during the First World War, when Gibraltar served as an assembly point for convoys. Unlike the Sanitary Commission, a portion of the new Council's members were elected by popular franchise, making it the first Gibraltarian body to be filled in part by public election. The reform was nonetheless limited: the franchise extended only to ratepayers, the Council's responsibilities were confined to municipal and sanitary administration, and Gibraltar still had no legislature, the governor continuing to exercise full legislative and executive power himself, though an advisory Executive Council was established the following year.

The Council initially occupied the former Sanitary Commission premises in Convent Place, and from 24 September 1924 it sat in the City Hall in John Mackintosh Square, where it met for most of its existence.

The scope of the Council's powers and the method of selecting its members were contested at its creation. The local branch of the Workers' Union (which became the Transport and General Workers' Union in the early 1920s) had campaigned for a body with greater popular involvement than the Sanitary Commission, membership of which had been reserved for wealthier residents. In the summer of 1921 the governor, Sir Horace Smith-Dorrien, appointed a committee to draft the new council's constitution; it comprised the colonial secretary (who chaired it and held the casting vote), two local notables and two union representatives. The committee's draft proposed a ratio of four elected to five nominated members and a £30 property qualification for candidates. The union representatives objected to both, arguing for an elected majority and against a restriction they regarded as confining candidacy to the wealthier Gibraltarians who had previously sat on the Sanitary Commission. After a public rally at the Theatre Royal in June 1921 and a subsequent dispute in the Gibraltar Chronicle, Smith-Dorrien ensured that the ordinance establishing the Council contained no property qualification for candidates, although the nominated majority was retained.

The Council had a wide range of functions including fire prevention, enforcing public health measures, maintaining highways, street lighting and cleansing, providing water, electricity, gas and a telephone service, and issuing vehicle licences, driving licences and dog licences. Several of these licensing powers had come to the Council under the Licensing (Transfer of Powers) Ordinance (Ordinance No. 8), which, following the abolition of the office of police magistrate, made the Council responsible for issuing licences for hackney carriages and their drivers, carts and dogs, among others. Certain matters lay outside its remit: hospitals, education and the administration of the port and markets were the responsibility of the government. The governor also had certain controlling powers in relation to the finances of the Council and the salaries of its officials. The Council's remit was extended over time: in 1954, responsibility for licensing places of entertainment was transferred to it from the colonial government by Ordinance No. 15.

== Composition ==
The Council was presided over by a chairman appointed by the Council which was later renamed in late 1955 to that of 'mayor'. James Andrews-Speed served as the Council's first chairman, from 1921. Joshua Hassan, the chairman of the Council at the time of the renaming, became the first mayor of Gibraltar.

As originally constituted, the Council had four elected members (one for each of the town's four wards) and five nominated members, giving the nominated side a majority of one. Under the City Council Ordinance 1921 the five non-elected members comprised three councillors nominated by the governor to represent the Government of Gibraltar, the Admiralty and the War Office, together with two others appointed by the governor; representation of the air force among the service members dates from the Council's reconstitution after the Second World War. The service members attended Council meetings in uniform.

The first council, returned at the December 1921 election, comprised the nominated members J. R. Crook (Director of Public Works), Surgeon Captain A. Maclean and Major H. E. Cond; the appointed members G. Gaggero and A. C. Greenwood; and the elected members James Andrews-Speed (chairman), G. Bellotti, A. E. Huart and C. T. Pou.

In 1927 the City Council Ordinance 1921 was amended by Ordinance No. 4, which allowed the appointment of a vice-chairman and enabled every elector to vote for the candidates in all four wards; previously an elector could vote only for candidates in the ward in which they resided.

The Council was suspended during the Second World War. Legislation enacted in 1940 transferred control of municipal affairs from the Council to a single commissioner, and the governor assumed its powers in 1941. An announcement dated 30 December 1944 set out proposals for constitutional development, including the establishment of an Advisory Council and the reconstitution of the City Council with extended functions and a larger elected majority. The Advisory Council proposal was held in abeyance after representative bodies (the Gibraltar Chamber of Commerce, the Exchange and Commercial Library, the Transport and General Workers' Union and the Association for the Advancement of Civil Rights) pressed instead for a legislative council; certain modifications to the City Council's constitution put forward by those bodies were adopted. The reconstituted Council, which had an elected majority for the first time, comprised seven elected and six official members, and elections were held in July 1945. The Council marked its silver jubilee on 30 December 1946.

In 1955, the Council consisted of:

- The chief medical officer for Gibraltar, as an ex-officio member,
- Five councillors appointed by the governor which had to include one representative for each of the Naval, Military and Air Forces, holding office during the governor's pleasure (the non-military councillors held office for a term of three years), and
- Seven elected councillors, who held office for a term of three years.

Elected councillors could not be servants of the City Council or civil servants, and candidates were required to be able to speak, read and write English.

The director of education was an ex-officio member of the City Council until 1949, when the director of labour and welfare became an ex-officio member. The director of labour and welfare ceased to be an ex-officio councillor in 1950; from that year, with only the chief medical officer sitting ex officio, the number of councillors appointed by the governor rose from four to five, leaving the Council's total membership at thirteen.

In 1956, the number of councillors appointed by the governor reduced to four.

== Elections ==
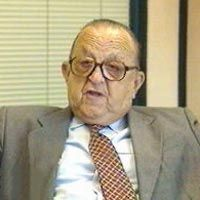
Joshua Hassan, 1st Mayor of Gibraltar

The first elections to the Council were held on 1 December 1921, the first occasion on which public elections had taken place in Gibraltar. The franchise was limited to male ratepayers. Despite heavy rain, turnout was reported at nearly 75 per cent of registered voters. According to one account, 2,997 of the 4,265 ratepayers entitled to vote did so, in a total population of about 18,500. Candidates supported by the Workers' Union won three of the four wards, a result attributed to the union's organisation; none of the candidates put forward by the Exchange Committee and the Chamber of Commerce were returned. A later account states that all four elected seats went to union-backed candidates.

After the Council was reconstituted with an elected majority, elections for its seven elected seats were held on 24 July 1945; of some 5,332 registered electors, each able to cast up to four votes, 3,712 voted, and the Association for the Advancement of Civil Rights (AACR) won every seat. At this time the franchise was confined to male British subjects aged twenty-one or over who had resided in the colony for at least a year and were not serving in the regular armed forces. The reconstituted Council took office on 1 August 1945.

The City Council (Constitution and Powers) Ordinance was amended in 1947 by Ordinance No. 18, which allowed women to vote and to stand for election to the Council. At the elections of 17 December 1947, the first at which women could stand and vote, the seven AACR candidates were returned unopposed; among them, Dorothy Ellicott became the first woman to sit on the Council.

From 1950 the Council's elections were conducted under the Elections Ordinance 1950, which extended the franchise to all adult British subjects and citizens of the Republic of Ireland who had been resident in Gibraltar for at least twelve months; unlike the Legislative Council established that year, the City Council was not elected by proportional representation. An election for the seven elected seats was held on 6 December 1950, at which 4,142 people voted.

At the 1953 election to the City Council, 6530 persons voted. This placed the turnout for the election at roughly 50 per cent. Five of the elected members belonged to the AACR, and the other two were independents.

At the 1956 election to the Council, 5300 persons voted, which was a drop of nearly 1200 from the last election. This put the turn for the election at roughly 40 per cent. Five of the elected members belonged to the AACR, one to the Gibraltar Commonwealth Party, and the other was an independent.

At the 1959 election, held on 2 December, seven candidates were nominated for the seven elected seats and were declared elected without a poll being held. Five of the elected members belonged to the AACR and two were independents.

The final elections to the Council were held on 1 December 1965. Of the seven seats, the AACR contested four and independents five; Joshua Hassan topped the poll and was again elected mayor.

== Calls for reform ==
Demands for greater local representation continued through the 1920s and 1930s. Such calls began almost immediately after the Council's creation. At the annual general meeting of the Exchange on 24 January 1922, Dr P. F. Lyon argued that the Council as then constituted did not satisfy Gibraltar's aspirations and looked forward to a time when Gibraltarians would assume full control of local affairs, holding that the main obstacle to progress was a lack of understanding of Gibraltar among those in authority in Britain, remarking that some there still imagined the territory to be an obscure African outpost. In February 1926 the governor, Sir Charles Monro, rejected a call for an elected majority on the City Council, and a similar request from the Exchange and Commercial Library was refused about three years later. In 1929 the Transport and General Workers' Union proposed increasing the number of elected members from four to five, but the proposal was rejected.

In 1934 the Exchange Committee, the Chamber of Commerce and the Transport and General Workers' Union each pressed for greater representation of Gibraltarians in the colony's government, though on different lines: the Chamber of Commerce's own scheme envisaged seats being allocated to the Chamber, the Exchange Committee and the union rather than filled by popular election, which no governor or secretary of state would support. A mass meeting was held in August 1934 and a petition to the King-in-Council was signed by 3,152 people out of an electoral register of 3,890. The petition, backed by the union but not by the Chamber of Commerce, was rejected, and no significant further advance was made before the Second World War.

== Finances ==
Nearly a third of the City Council's revenue came from Rates, with the remainder coming from Council services such as water, gas, electricity and telephones. During the Second World War, rates (along with rents) had been reduced to a third of their pre-war level in 1941 and were restored to that level in 1945. In 1950 the government advanced the Council a loan of £127,000 towards a large electricity development scheme. The Council tended to maintain a fiscal surplus, but in 1957 it ran a £31,265 deficit which continued into the following year, although at a reduced level.

== Abolition ==
Proposals to abolish the Council pre-dated its dissolution. In October 1960 a report by R. S. Hudson recommended abolishing the City Council and increasing the Legislative Council's elected members from seven to nine, with municipal functions transferred to a committee of the legislature and the council's departments absorbed into the civil service; the AACR opposed the plan. The City Council was abolished in 1969 when the Gibraltar Constitution Order 1969 came into force, its functions being merged with those of the Legislative Council to form the Gibraltar House of Assembly. The position of mayor continued although in a ceremonial capacity, not a political capacity. Joshua Hassan was the only political mayor of Gibraltar and left office when the Council was abolished.

== See also ==
- Gibraltar Constitution Order 1969
