= Dominique Searle =

Dominique Searle MBE
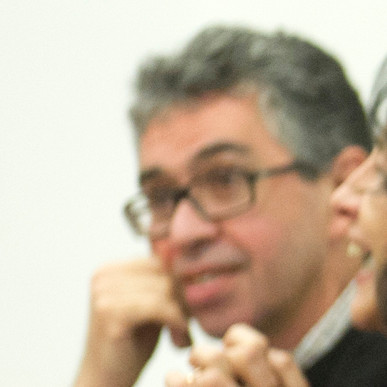
- in 2013
- Born: Dominique Searle; 2 April 1960 (age 66); Gibraltar, United Kingdom
- Occupation: Gibraltar representative to the united kingdom (chief minister's special representative) – hm government of gibraltar
- Known for: Editor of the Gibraltar Chronicle
- Spouse: Sattie
- Children: Arthur, Lawrence and Clara

Dominique Searle MBE (2 April 1960) is a Gibraltarian journalist, son of the also journalist Jon Morgan Searle. Editor of the Gibraltar Chronicle, he is married and has three children.

== Biography ==
Searle was born in Gibraltar, at the old St Bernard's Hospital, where his mother worked. He was one of the first students admitted to Bayside Comprehensive School. His first job was at the House of Sacarello coffeehouse.

After his time at Bayside, Searle travelled to the United Kingdom to study at the University of Essex, where he graduated in literature, and earned a Master of Arts in Sociology of literature. It was also in Essex that he met his wife, Sattie. In 1984, the couple returned to Gibraltar, where Searle began working for the Gibraltar Chronicle. In 1996, he became editor of the newspaper, replacing Francis Cantos.

In 2004, during the Tercentenary year of British Gibraltar, Searle received an MBE for his work at the Chronicle.
