= Encarnación Magaña =

Spanish anarchist and libertarian feminist

- Born: Encarnación Magaña Gómez; 30 November 1921; Tabernas
- Died: 11 August 1942; Almería

Encarnación Magaña Gómez (Tabernas, 30 November 1921 – Almería, 11 August 1942), also known as Encarnita Magaña and Encarnación García Córdoba, was a Spanish anarchist and libertarian feminist. She was a member of the Iberian Federation of Libertarian Youth and the Confederación Nacional del Trabajo (CNT), and served as interim secretary of Mujeres Libres.

Magaña was executed by the Francoists after being tried in the infamous Parte Inglés trial, making her the only woman executed after the Spanish Civil War in the province of Almería.

== Biography ==
Magaña was born in Tabernas, in the province of Almería, on 30 November 1921. She became orphaned at a young age following the death of her mother, Dolores Gómez Soriano, a homemaker, and her father, José Magaña Rosa, a farm laborer. Afterward, she was adopted by Rafael García Montesinos and Epifanía Córdoba Tortosa, taking on their surnames.

She developed her political and intellectual commitment during her youth by joining the Iberian Federation of Libertarian Youth, an anarchist youth organization where she served as secretary and interim secretary of Mujeres Libres. She was also a member of the Confederación Nacional del Trabajo (CNT) and worked as a saleswoman at the Librería Inglesa in Almería. After the end of the war, Magaña began to oppose Franco's regime in an organized manner.

She married José Hernández Ojeda, with whom she engaged in agitation and propaganda activities. Magaña organized the charitable International Antifascist Solidarity Festival at the Cervantes Theatre in Almería, and she visited anarchist militiamen on the front of Granada to bring them newspapers and food. On 3 August 1939, she was imprisoned for the first time at the provincial women's prison in Almería, known as Gachas colorás, where she continued her political activity in service of the International Red Aid among antifascist political prisoners and externally. She was released in the spring of 1940.

=== El Parte Inglés ===
Taking advantage of her work at the Librería Inglesa, Magaña, along with other antifascists led by Joaquín Villaespesa Quintana, undertook the task of translating and copying bulletins from the British BBC about World War II. These were later distributed in Almería and Gibraltar through the antifranco publication El Calpense, in support of the Allies in the war against Nazi Germany under Adolf Hitler.

A denunciation exposed Magaña to the Francoist authorities. She was arrested for disseminating subversive propaganda and belonging to an underground organization by the FET y de las JONS investigation service. She was imprisoned on March 24, 1941, and was never released. Many of her comrades in the organization were arrested a month later. They were tried in a trial known as El Parte Inglés, which had a significant impact in post-war Almería. Magaña was sentenced to death in an exemplary judgment, along with eight other companions, in a trial with few procedural guarantees.

Magaña was executed at the age of 20 in Almería on the night of 11 August 1942, alongside Joaquín Villaespesa Quintana, Cristóbal Company García, Francisco García Luna, Justo Ruiz Pelegrina, Juan Hernández Granados, Diego Molina Matarín, and Francisco Martín Vázquez. She was buried in a mass grave with two of them. She was the only woman executed during Franco's regime in Almería.

== Legacy ==
In 2020, a street in Tabernas was named Encarnación Magaña in recognition of her struggle for freedom, making it the first street in this town in Almería to be named after a woman.

The story of Encarnación Magaña and that of the eight others executed with her are recounted in the book "El Parte Inglés. La lucha antifranquista desde la clandestinidad en Almería" published by Círculo Rojo, based on the research by historian Eusebio Rodríguez Padilla.
