= Bignone =

Bignone may refer to:

- Monte Bignone, a mountain in Liguria, northern Italy, part of the Ligurian Alps
- Reynaldo Bignone (1928–2018), retired Argentine general who served as dictatorial President of Argentina 1982–1983
