= Jon Morgan Searle =

Gibraltarian journalist and editor

- Born: Jon Morgan Searle; 22 June 1930; Buckfast, United Kingdom
- Died: 13 March 2012 (aged 81); Gibraltar
- Other name: John Searle
- Education: McGill University
- Occupation: Editor
- Known for: Editor of the Gibraltar Chronicle
- Children: Dominique and Marisa

Jon Morgan Searle (22 June 1930 – 13 March 2012) was a Gibraltarian journalist and editor of the Gibraltar Chronicle. He was also correspondent for the news agency Reuters and The Times of London.

== Biography ==
Searle was born in Buckfast, Devon, on 22 June 1930. As a child, he moved to Canada after the death of his mother, and was raised by family friends. He graduated in fine arts at McGill University in Quebec, before returning to the United Kingdom, where he served in the Royal Army Educational Corps.

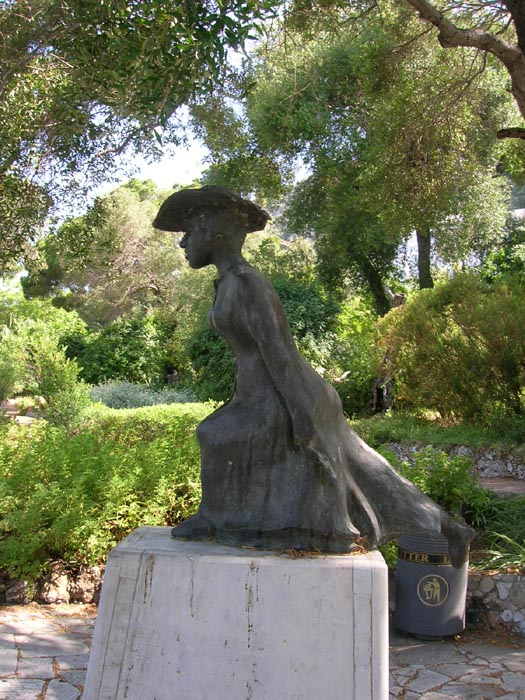
Molly Bloom from Ulysses by Searle

During his military service, he was posted to Gibraltar for the first time, where he taught art and met his future wife, Lina. The couple returned to England, where Lina studied physiotherapy in Manchester and Jon graduated in social psychology at Liverpool University and where he was instrumental in setting up the first Boys' Club in the dockland area, for delinquents. After completing their studies, the couple lived for some time in Coventry, before returning to Gibraltar.

On The Rock, Jon worked as a probation officer and teacher at St. Jago's School during the late 1950s. In 1966, Searle had become a journalist and rose to be editor of the national newspaper, a post he held until 1986. During this time he was also correspondent for Reuters and The Times of London, reporting on Gibraltar and the wider region.

Searle also served as secretary of the Garrison Library for many years. His son, Dominique later became editor of the Chronicle in 1996.

Searle maintained his love of fine arts and once retired became prolific in producing ceramics and sculptures. Notably the bronze sculpture of Molly Bloom which now stands (in fact runs) at the Alameda Gardens. This figure was commissioned in commemoration of the bicentenary of the Gibraltar Chronicle. Searle exhibited his ceramics in Cornwall, Adalucia and Gibraltar. Gibraltar's Arts and Crafts Society has examples of Searle's work on permanent display.

Searle tried to improve the understanding and co-operation between journalists in Andalucía, Morocco and Gibraltar. This he achieved during the latter part of his life. After he died all three press associations held a memorial meeting in his honour, and at which one of Jon's best loved pieces, made using three different clays joined, was presented to the journalists by his children. Since then an annual scholarship for journalism is offered in his name.

Jon Searle died on 13 March 2012.

== Autobiography ==
- Song for a new life
