= Cervantes Theatre =

Argentina

- Cervantes Theatre, in Buenos Aires;

Spain

- Cervantes Theatre, in Almeria;
- Cervantes Theatre, in Alcalá de Henares;
- Cervantes Theatre, in Béjar;
- Cervantes Theatre, in Jaén;
- Cervantes Theatre, in Málaga;
- Cervantes Theatre, in Murcia;
- Cervantes Theatre, in Segovia;
- Cervantes Theatre, in Valladolid;

Morocco

- Cervantes Theatre, in Tangier;

Mexico

- Cervantes Theatre, in Guanajuato

United Kingdom

- Cervantes Theatre in Southwark, London
