= El Calpense =

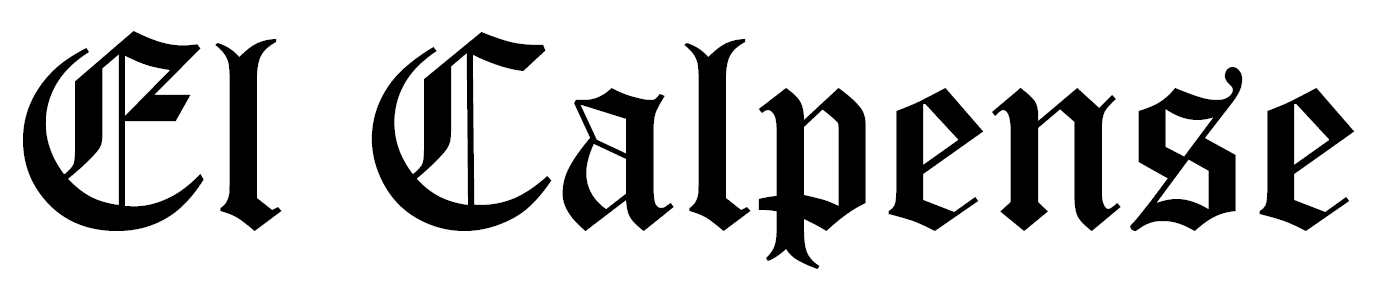

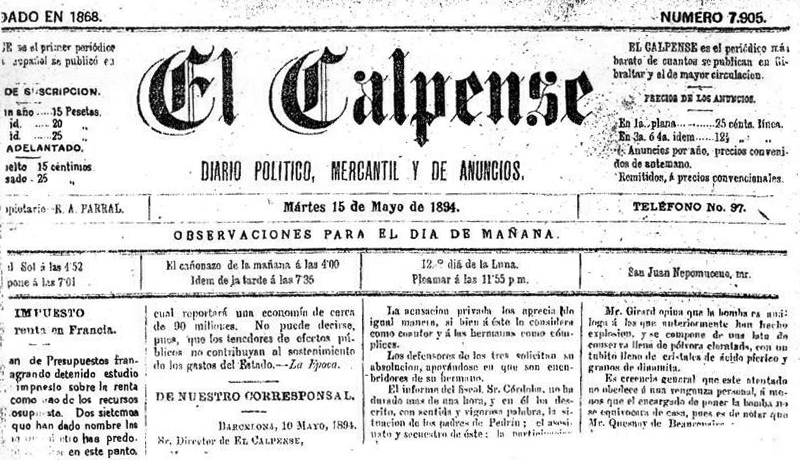
- El Calpense cover page from 15 May 1894.
- Type: Daily newspaper
- Owner: Parral family
- Publisher: Imprenta Calpense
- Founded: 1868
- Ceased publication: 1982
- Language: Spanish
- Headquarters: Calpense House, College Lane, Gibraltar
- Circulation: 3,000

El Calpense was a Spanish language newspaper that was published in the then Crown colony (now British overseas territory) of Gibraltar between 1868 and 1982. Its name is synonymous, in Spanish, to "The Gibraltarian" (Calpe being an ancient name for Gibraltar, as it was the name given to the Rock of Gibraltar as one of the Pillars of Hercules).

El Calpense (subtitled a political, commercial and advertising daily, Spanish: Diario político, mercantil y de anuncios) was founded as a daily and was the first Spanish language newspaper published in Gibraltar. Owned and run by Spaniards, its emergence was at first resisted by the Governors of Gibraltar, who worried about possible troubles with Spain and disruption in the town. Its audience was not only among the Spanish-speaking community in Gibraltar, but also in the surrounding area, the Campo de Gibraltar. Its contents was rather similar to those of the Gibraltar Chronicle, but in Spanish. It also included reviews of Madrid-based Spanish press as well as the British press.

== History ==
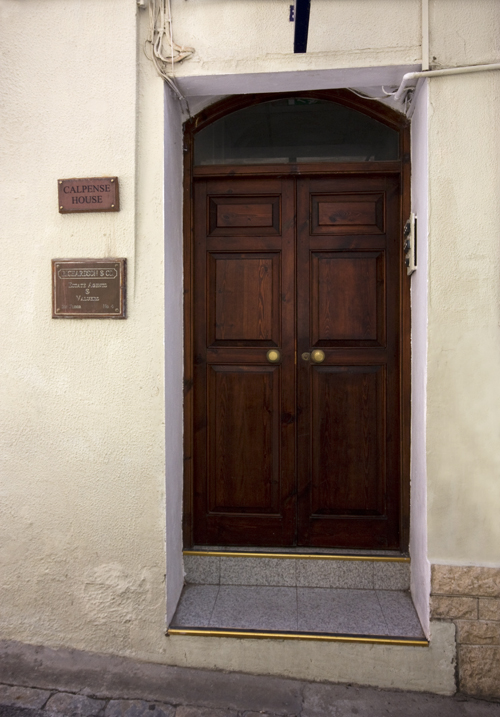
Entrance to Calpense House in College Lane, Gibraltar, where El Calpense was printed.

Gibraltar's oldest newspaper, the Gibraltar Chronicle (1801), was published in English at a time when much of the civilian population spoke mainly Spanish with some Genoese and Maltese also used. Although the Chronicle remained popular among the garrison, a large proportion of the population would have not have benefited from a paper published in English. El Calpense fulfilled this purpose once it had established itself as a daily but its founders, the Parral family, fought long and hard before they were permitted a licence to publish their paper.

It was one of the leading newspapers of the territory. In 1878 it had a daily circulation of 500 copies (the Gibraltar Chronicle and El Anunciador had 400 each). During the first third of the 20th century, it had about 1,250 (1,200 for the Gibraltar Guardian and 1,000 for El Anunciador). During the Spanish Civil War (1936 to 1939) (when its editorial sympathies lay with the Republican side) it reached 20,000, stabilising at 3,000 during the Second World War, when it enthusiastically supported the Allies cause. Copies of El Calpense were smuggled into Francoist Spain, becoming "a beacon and herald of democracy and liberty".

The paper started its decline with the worsening of relationships with Spain. In the 1960s it became a weekly newspaper. When the border between Spain and Gibraltar was eventually closed by Spain in 1969, the newspaper changed its ownership and begun to be published in English. It later closed in 1982.

== Gallery ==
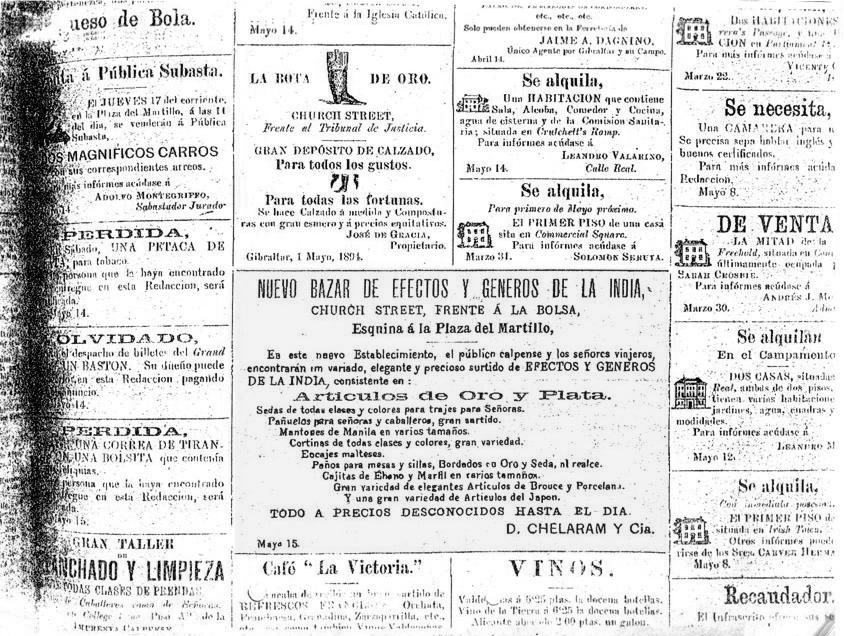
Notice page from El Calpense of 15 May 1894.

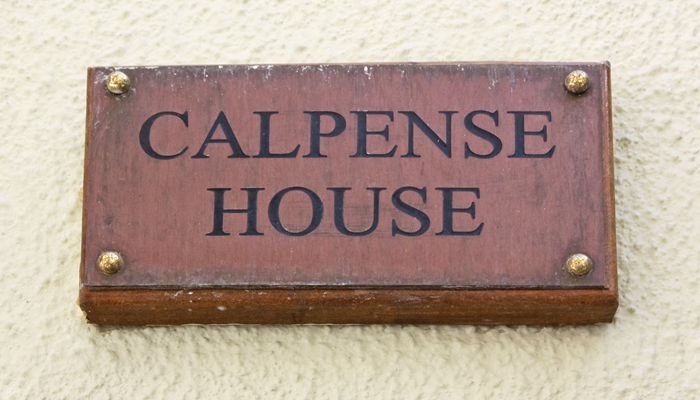
Plaque at the entrance to Calpense House.
