= Gibtelecom =

Telecommunications company in Gibraltar

Gibtelecom Limited
- Company type: Privately held company
- Industry: Telecommunications
- Predecessor: Gibraltar Nynex Communications; Gibtel
- Founded: 2001
- Headquarters: 15/21 John Mackintosh Square, Gibraltar
- Area served: Gibraltar
- Key people: Noel Burrows (CEO)
- Products: Fixed-line telephony, mobile, broadband internet, digital tv, submarine cable lobster spain (mvno)
- Revenue: £100 million
- Owner: Gibraltar Savings Bank (100%)
- Number of employees: 160
- Website: gibtele.com

Gibtelecom is the largest telecommunications provider in the British overseas territory of Gibraltar. Its headquarters is located on John Mackintosh Square.

== History ==
The first telephones were introduced to Gibraltar in 1886 by a private company which was later taken over by the colonial authorities. Since 1926, the telephone service was operated by the City Council. Upon the approval of the 1969 Constitution and the dissolution of the City Council, the telephone service was transferred to the newly formed Government of Gibraltar. Until 1990, all telephone services were operated by the Gibraltar Government Telephone Department. International circuits were provided by Cable & Wireless, which had been founded as the Falmouth, Malta, Gibraltar Telegraph Company in 1869. This later operated as the Eastern Telegraph Company from Mount Pleasant in Gibraltar. However, Cable & Wireless left Gibraltar in 1987. On 1 January 1988, British Telecom (BT) and the Government of Gibraltar formed a joint venture company called Gibraltar Telecommunications International Ltd (known by its commercial brand Gibtel) to operate Gibraltar's international telecommunications services. Gibtel was subsequently granted a licence to offer mobile telephony introducing a GSM900 network.

In 1990, the Government decided to privatise its Telephone Department and therefore entered into a joint venture with Nynex of the United States. Gibraltar Nynex Communications Ltd (GNC) became responsible for fixed-line telephony. GNC was the first acquisition of Nynex outside the Americas. In 1997, GNC, through its wholly owned subsidiary, GNC Networks, commenced Internet services. GNC Networks was later renamed GibConnect. ADSL services were introduced in 2002.

In 2001, BT sold its 50% stake in Gibtel to GNC. Both companies subsequently merged to form Gibtelecom, a joint venture between the Government of Gibraltar and Nynex's successor company, Verizon. The name Gibtelecom begun to be used in July 2002, and as of 1 October 2003 this name was formally adopted by the company (which up until then was still Gibraltar Nynex Communications). In April 2007, Verizon sold its shares to Telekom Slovenije which is the incumbent part-state owned telecommunications operator in Slovenia and is quoted on the Ljubljana Stock Exchange. Telekom Slovenije paid €36.7m for Verizon's 50 per cent stake in Gibtelecom.

In 2009, the Government of Gibraltar announced it may sell its stake in Gibtelecom. However, as of August 2020, no decision has been made.

In 2015, the 50 per cent share of Gibtelecom owned by Telecom Slovenia Was bought by Gibraltar Savings Bank, which now owns 100 per cent of the shares in the company.

== Board ==
Gibtelecom's board of directors is made up of six directors, whereas the owners (the Government of Gibraltar and Telekom Slovenije) nominate three each. The current chairman is Fabian Picardo, Chief Minister. However, in October 2010, the Government of Gibraltar announced that EU Communications Directives had to be enforced so that a same Minister cannot "exercise powers under the Directives and also be involved in ownership and control functions of a telecommunications company in Gibraltar". Therefore, competences over Telecommunications were transferred to the Minister of Housing, retaining Holliday as Chairman of Gibtelecom.

Tim Bristow was the first CEO, a post had held since the company's foundation in 2001, before he stepped down at the end of 2018. Previously, he was the Financial Secretary of Gibraltar, a post he held for several years.

== Services ==
GibTelecom Provides the following services from the following networks as of 2020 January.

VDSL2 Network

GibTelecom uses the existing copper network to provide broadband services up to 100 Mbps/30 Mbps speeds.

FTTP Network

The company provides Telephone and Broadband services to Residential, Public Manufacturing and Business Sector customers using this network. Max capable speeds of 1 Gbps synchronous.

GSM 4G/5G Wireless Network

The company provides Mobile Phone and Mobile Broadband services to Residential, Public Manufacturing and Business Sector customers using this network.

IT, Data and Network Services

The company provides Web Hosting, Cloud Storage, Private Branch Exchange and Network Solutions to Public and Business Sector customers using its Data Centers and Backhaul Ethernet Network.

Pay TV

GibTelecom Partnered with Netgem TV in France in 2018 to provide a IPTV OTT platform to provide Pay TV services to Residential customers using a Netgem IPTV/OTT and DVB-T Set Top Box with 65 TV channels 7 Day Catch Up TV on Selected channels with a UPnP Media Player and OTT services such as Netflix, Rakuten TV, Amazon Prime Video, Deezer, Eros Now and Hopster TV.

The Set Top Box can be connected to a VHF/UHF Antenna to receive Free to Air Spanish and Moroccan TV channels accessible in Gibraltar.

== International connectivity ==
Telefónica of Spain, Cable & Wireless and Interoute of the United Kingdom provide international connectivity to Gibtelecom. Gibtelecom is also a partner in the Europe India Gateway cable system, which has a landing point in Gibraltar.

== Sponsorship ==
Gibtelecom is the official sponsor of the Gibtelecom International Chess Festival annually held in Gibraltar since 2003. On 13 December 2016 Gibtelecom became a sponsor of the Rock Cup.

== See also ==
- Communications in Gibraltar
- List of mobile network operators in Europe
