= Sacarello's =

Coffee shop in Gibraltar

Coordinates: 36.142342°N 5.354003°W

P. Sacarello Limited
- Logo of Sacarello's coffee shop

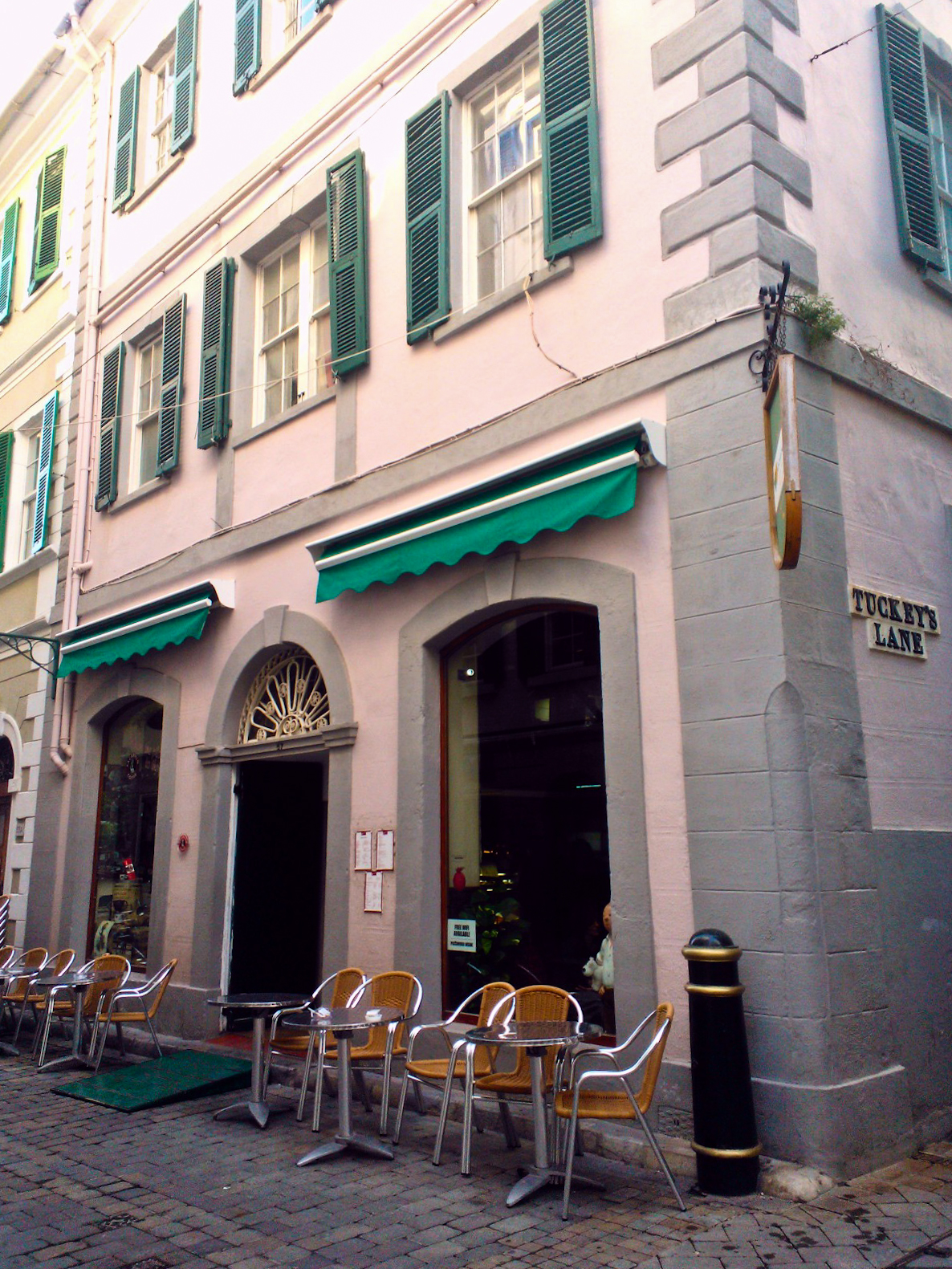
- Sacarello's coffee shop in 2014
- Trade name: Sacarello's
- Company type: Private
- Industry: Coffee; Restaurant
- Founded: Gibraltar (1888)
- Founder: Bartholomew Sacarello
- Headquarters: 57 Irish Town, Gibraltar
- Number of locations: 2 (2014)
- Area served: Gibraltar; Spain
- Key people: Patrick Sacarello (coffee shop/restaurant); Richard Sacarello (wholesale/distribution)
- Products: Sacarello Coffee; La Negrita
- Services: Coffee roasting; Coffee shop; Restaurant; Wholesale
- Website: www.sacarellosgibraltar.com

P. Sacarello Limited, more commonly known as Sacarello's, was a coffee roasting family business and coffee shop/restaurant in the British Overseas Territory of Gibraltar. Originally Italian, the Sacarello family first established itself in Gibraltar in the early 19th century and, despite economic upheavals, has served the Rock for over 125 years. The Sacarellos owned a merchant house at 57 Irish Town, on the corner of Tuckey's Lane, since 1906 which, until 2024, housed their coffee shop.

== History ==
=== Italian origins ===
The Sacarello name first established itself in Gibraltar with the arrival at Gibraltar Harbour of Giovanni Batista Sacarello, an Italian merchant. Giovanni was originally from Spotorno at the foot of Monte Saccarello near the Ligurian capital of Genoa, but had been based in the port city of Livorno as the captain of a brigantine. He led his ship through the major Mediterranean ports trading in wool and hides becoming a frequent visitor to Gibraltar where he met local Maria Dominica Bignone whom he married at the Cathedral of St. Mary the Crowned in 1817. He was 27 and Maria was 20. Bignone was also of Ligurian descent with her family also hailing from Spotorno. Her surname also took its name from a nearby mountain, Monte Bignone. For this reason the Sacarello-Bignone marriage was to be known as the "Marriage of Two Mountains".

However, the newlyweds did not immediately settle in Gibraltar. They left the Rock soon after the wedding, probably to go back to Livorno or elsewhere in Liguria. It was 1845 before Giovanni returned to the Rock's shores indefinitely, with Maria having made it back sooner. The marriage marked the start of the Sacarello family of Gibraltar. After having been settled in Gibraltar for some time, the couple's youngest son Francisco Felipe (born 26 June 1833) married Maria Magdalena Fava (born 1837). Their son Bartholomew Sacarello - better known as Bartolo - later founded the family business by establishing B. Sacarello Limited as a provisions merchant in 1888.

=== Starting a family business ===
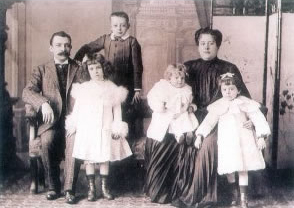
Bartholomew and Josefa Sacarello with their children. Federico, eventual heir to the family business is seen sitting on his mother's knee

Gibraltar has always had to import almost everything it consumes; this was no different in the late 19th century when Gibraltar was a British garrison with few civilians. Bartolo was able to take advantage of this fact by supplying the local population with all and sundry - "from safety matches to flour, from buckets of lard to spaghetti". By the turn of the 19th century, the business was the top provisions merchant in Gibraltar. Soon Bartolo expanded into the Spanish and Moroccan markets and before long became rather wealthy. He soon realised that the future of his business lay in coffee which over a few years became an increasingly profitable part of the business, perhaps from his dealing with Spain. In just a few years coffee had generally become big business in Gibraltar which was probably partly down to the profitable smuggling trade which had become part of daily life on the Rock. Coffee, as well as tobacco, were the two main exports historically smuggled across the land border from Gibraltar into Spain. In 1906 Bartolo purchased a merchant house designed by renown Italian architect, Giovanni Maria Boschetti, on the corner of Irish Town and Tuckey's Lane.

=== Focus on coffee ===
Gradually ditching his other imports, Bartolo focused on purchasing large quantities of the finest Arabica and Robusta coffee beans from Africa and South America. Once arrived in Gibraltar the beans would be roasted, blended and packaged in-house at the Irish Town merchant house into a variety of brands to suite different tastes. By this time coffee drinking was becoming increasingly popular and the streets in both Gibraltar and Campo de Gibraltar were teeming with cafés. Although coffee smuggling later declined and eventually ceased to be profitable, the business continued to prosper purely on local trade and Sacarello's brands would soon become famous in Gibraltar and southern Spain.

=== Continuity through tough times ===
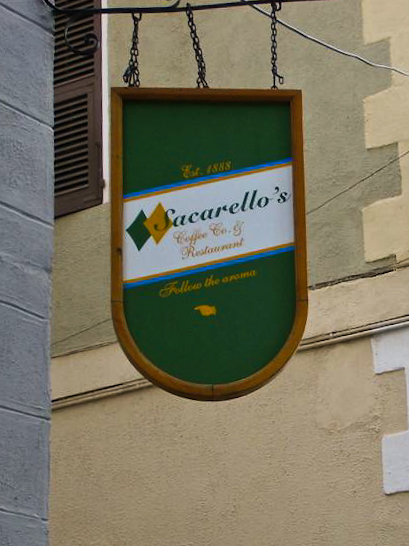
Sign outside Sacarello's coffee shop

Following the death of Bartolo, his wife Josefa encouraged their son Federico to take over the business at the young age of 17. Shortly after Federico took the helm, Spanish dictator Miguel Primo de Rivera, closed the frontier with Gibraltar in the 1920s making it harder to do business and maintain his widowed mother, brother and two sisters. This was the first of a repeating pattern of political obstacles which the family business would have to face from governments in Madrid. The next decade continued to be troublesome times for Gibraltar with the Spanish Civil War at its doorstep. The end of the war in 1939 reopened access to the Spanish market for Gibraltarian merchants. Commodities such as tobacco and coffee were scarce in the post civil war Spain and Federico, together with his younger brother Bartolo were able to sell vast quantities of coffee there. Their renown La Negrita brand became so popular in southern Spain that it was even mentioned in a famous chirigota, a satirical folksong so typical of the Cádiz Carnival.

The Sacarellos were the first Gibraltarian family to purchase a Rolls-Royce which was testament to the wealth that the business had amassed.

Federico did not marry until the mature age of 47. However, the marriage would eventually give fruit to four sons and the business continued to thrive under Federico's leadership until the frontier was shut once again by Spanish caudillo, Francisco Franco, in 1969. The latest frontier closure, which was to last 16 years, was to have a huge impact on the economy of Gibraltar especially in importation and exportation of goods. This meant drastic drops in coffee sales for Sacarello's. Nevertheless, the business weathered the economic storm and the eventual full re-opening of the frontier in 1985 (it had been opened in 1982 for pedestrians only) rekindled the demand for Sacarello's coffees in the Spanish hinterland as well as from tourists and the expanding retail and catering industry in Gibraltar.

=== From merchant house to coffee shop ===
Federico dedicated his entire working life to B. Sacarello Limited and following the hardships of the 1970s and early 80s two of his sons, Patrick and Richard, joined the family business and seeking to recover the business. in 1985 they hired the services of local heritage conservation architect, John Langdon, to design the conversion of the front warehouse in their centuries-old merchant house into a coffee shop while retaining the old coffee grinders and other machinery as original features. By 1994 the success of the new venture was such that the brothers sought to rehire Langdon to redesign and convert the remaining part of the warehouse into a kitchen with extended seating areas for customers.

The Sacarello brothers agreed to an amicable split of the business in 2009 whereby the coffee shop/restaurant is managed by Patrick and Richard retained the coffee roasting wholesale/distribution company with its new warehouse at Mons Calpe Road on the North Mole. The coffee shop stocked all of Sacarello's coffees as well as top of the range wines, jams, marmalades, chocolates and teas.

In 2013 Sacarello's celebrated its 125-year anniversary.
