= Garrison Library =

Library in Gibraltar

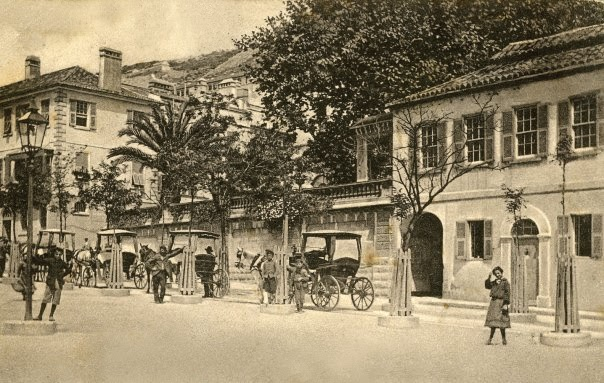
- Old photo showing the location of the Garrison Library.
- 36.138966°N 5.35215°W
- Location: Governor's Parade, Gibraltar
- Type: Reference library
- Scope: Local military history
- Established: 1793
- Reference to legal mandate: Gibraltar Garrison Library Trust Act 2011

Collection
- Items collected: Books, newspapers, maps
- Size: 45,000

Access and use
- Access requirements: Open Monday to Friday
- Population served: 30,000

Other information
- Director: Dr. Jennifer Ballantine Perera

The Garrison Library was founded in Gibraltar in 1793 by Captain (later Colonel) John Drinkwater Bethune.

== History ==
Constructed on the site of the Governors’ residence during the Spanish occupation of Gibraltar, the library was officially opened in 1804 by the Duke of Kent. In 1823 the library's fees were "100 hard dollars" which was paid by the 150 proprietors of the "Commercial Library". Each proprietor was entitled to borrow one large or three smaller books or an entire set of a novel for one to two weeks. In exchange they had to also pay 16 dollars per year. This was a commercial affair and membership of the library could be bought or sold. The thirteen members of the committee were elected annually and the library was to be open seven days a week with both winter and summer hours.

The library served as the headquarters and archive service of the Gibraltar Chronicle, the world's second oldest English language newspaper. The Library was established for and by the officers of the Garrison of Gibraltar. It has remained a private entity run by a Trust for over two hundred years up until, September 2011, at which point the Library was transferred to the Government of Gibraltar.

== Description ==
The Garrison is a library of 45,000 books, including many rare volumes. This library exists to hold the collection which includes good coverage of the subjects of culture and travel. The library was started to occupy officers stationed in Gibraltar. It has an excellent local history collection. Many lithographs and art prints are held here and many of the furnishings have interesting historical backgrounds.

In 2006 the editorial offices of the Gibraltar Chronicle moved to new premises in Watergate House, and the print works relocated in 2007 to New Harbours. The Chronicle's archive currently remains at the Garrison Library, as does the records of the more recent Panorama newspaper.

The dragon tree in the library's front garden is thought to date from the Spanish occupation when the plant was introduced to Gibraltar by mariners who brought the seeds from the Canary Islands.

== Gallery ==
Garrison Library
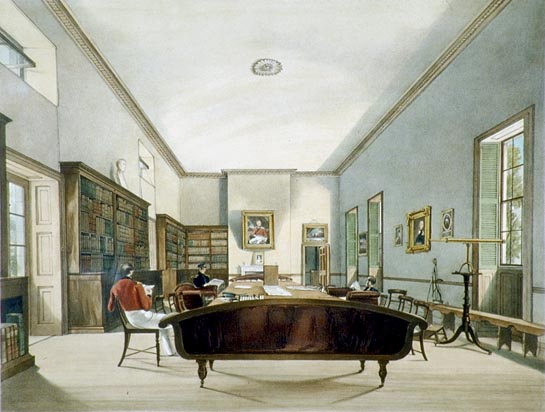
The library in 1846 by Thomas Colman Dibdin

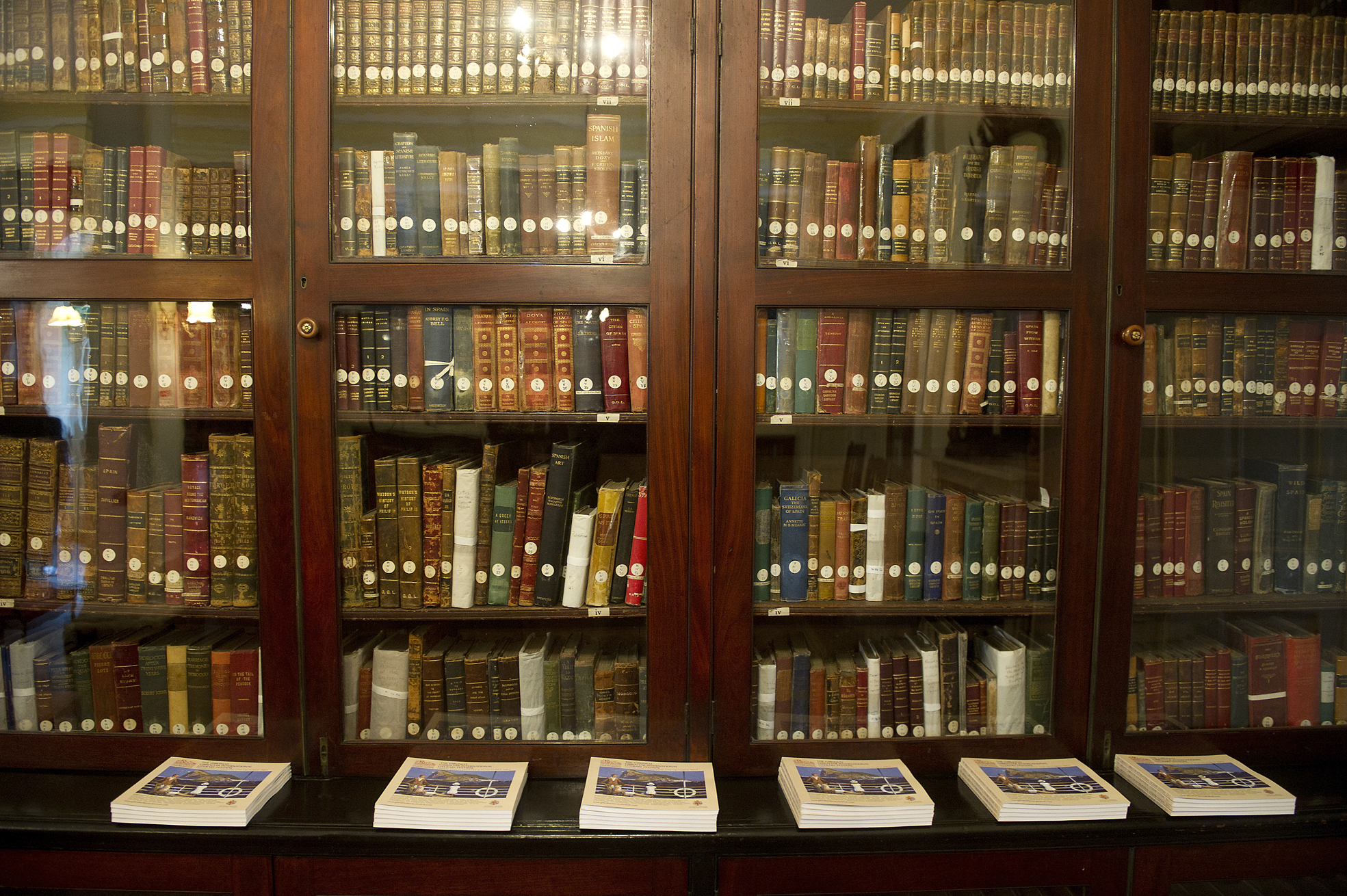
Part of the book collection at the library

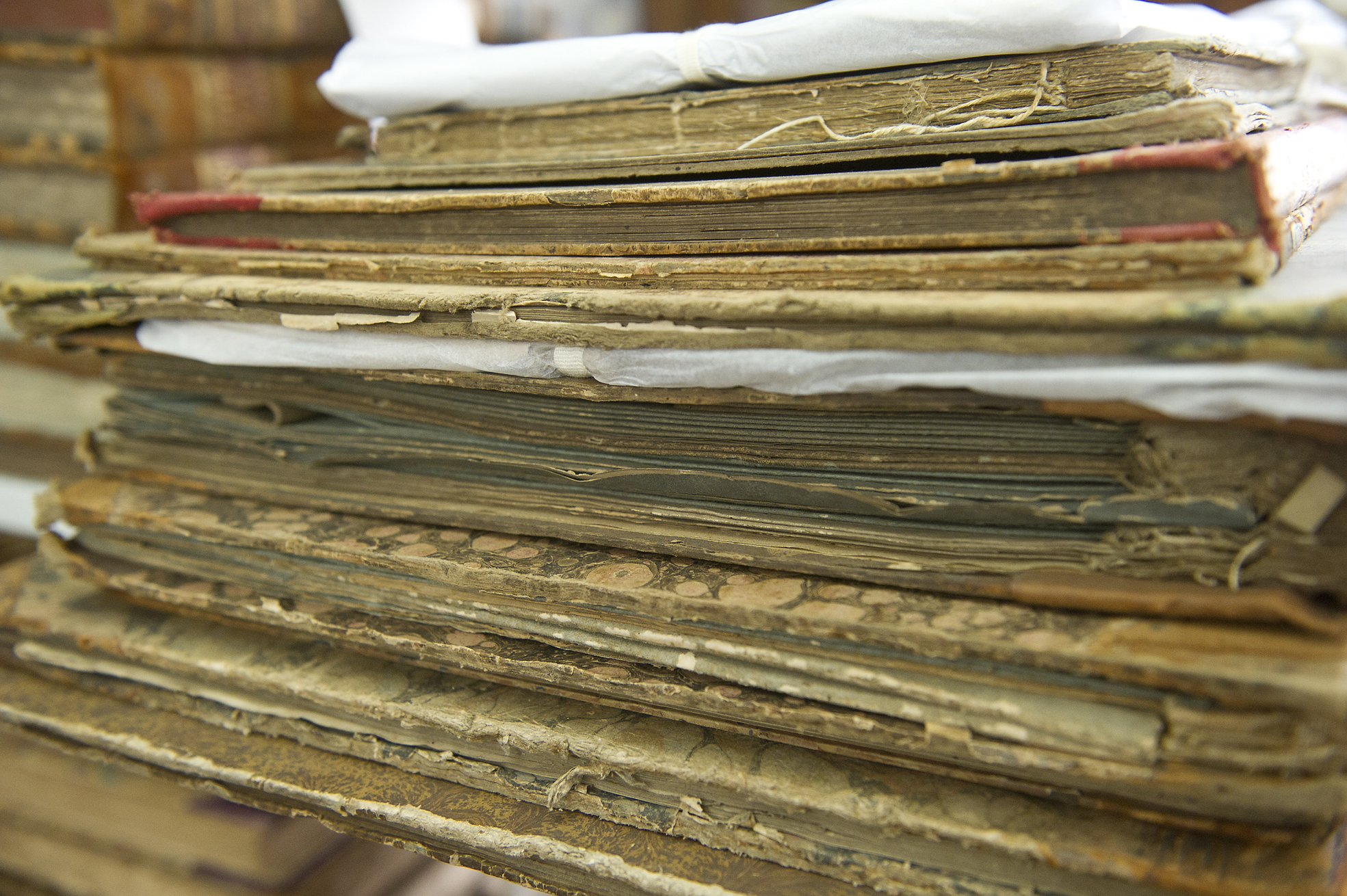
Some of the old books at the library

Volunteer Guide Robert Wheeler talks about the Garrison Library
