= Gibraltar Guardian =

Gibraltar Guardian was an English-language newspaper published in Gibraltar. The demise of the newspaper has been blamed on competition from local Spanish newspapers.
