= El Faro de Gibraltar =

Gibraltarian Daily Newspaper (Spanish)

- Type: Weekly newspaper
- Founded: 2003
- Language: Spanish

El Faro de Gibraltar is a Spanish language free weekly newspaper published in Gibraltar since 2003. It is the only Spanish language newspaper currently published in Gibraltar and belongs to the Spanish media group Publicaciones del Sur, S.A..
