= Panorama (Gibraltar) =

Defunct Daily Newspaper in Gibraltar

Coordinates: 36.141174°N 5.354038°W

- Front page
- Type: Daily newspaper
- Format: Compact (Tabloid)
- Editor: Lorraine Baldachino (2022-2024)
- Founded: 1975; 51 years ago
- Ceased publication: 26 April 2024
- Language: English; Llanito (section)
- Headquarters: 95 Irish Town, Gibraltar
- Website: Panorama.gi

Panorama was a daily newspaper published in Gibraltar.

== History ==
The newspaper was founded in December 1975 by journalist Joe Garcia Snr. MBE (1938-2022) who edited it until his death. He was succeeded by his daughter (and Deputy Chief Minister, Dr. Joseph Garcia's sister), Lorraine Baldachino. It was first published as a weekly newspaper and became a daily in 2002. It was the first Gibraltar newspaper to establish an online edition, in 1997. From its inception, the paper had been a strong defender of the Freedom of the Press, and believed in publishing the views of all sectors of Gibraltar society. Its editor Joe Garcia was the first Gibraltar journalist to receive an award in The Queen's Honours List for his services to journalism in Gibraltar and overseas. He had written extensively about Gibraltar in publications abroad, such as the London Financial Times (for 25 years) and Spain's leading daily El Pais (for 10 years).

The final edition of Panorama was published on 26 April 2024.

== See also ==
- Communications in Gibraltar
