= El Anunciador =

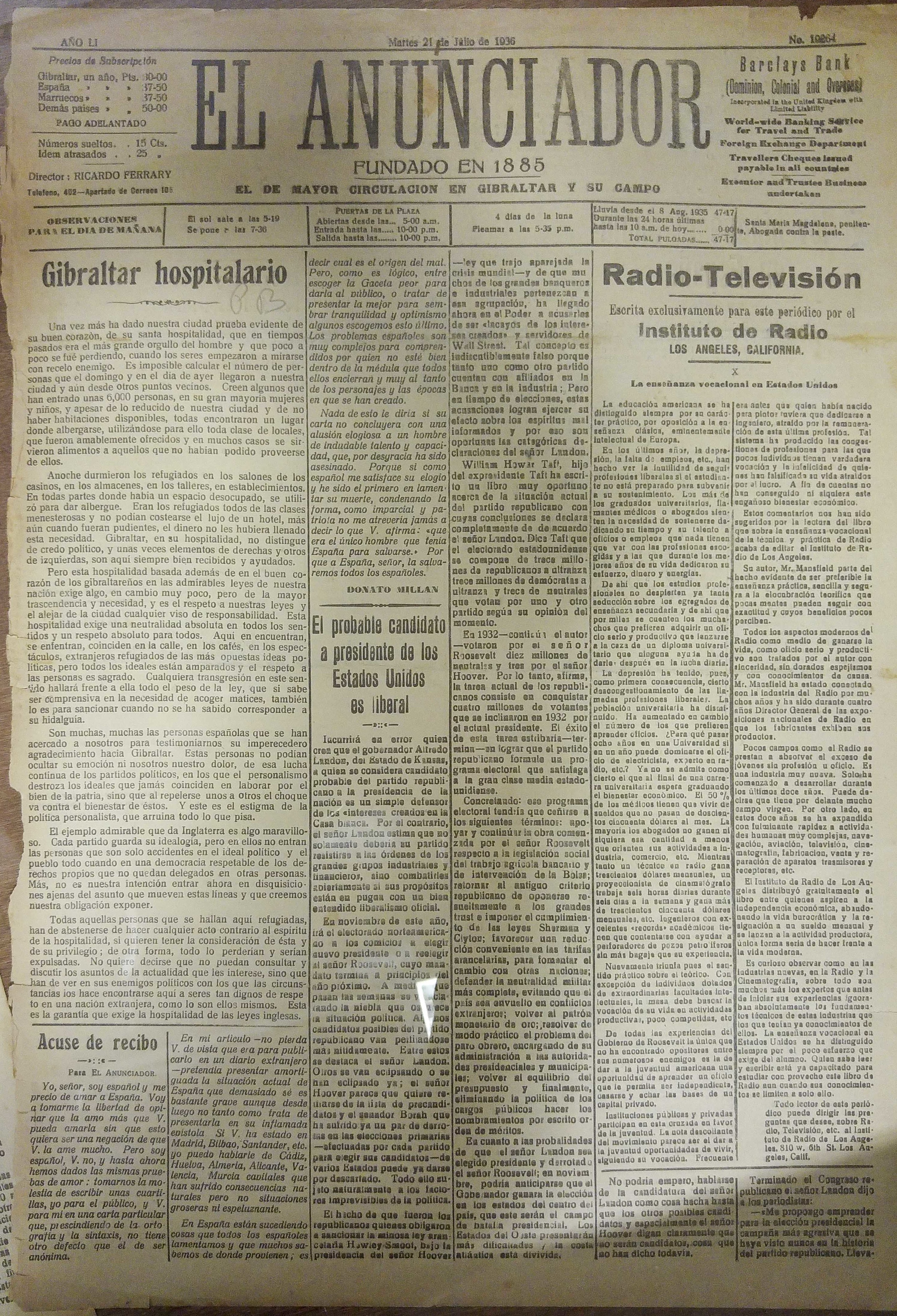
- Type: Daily newspaper
- Founded: 1885
- Ceased publication: 1940
- Language: Spanish
- Headquarters: Gibraltar

El Anunciador was a Spanish language newspaper that was published in the then Crown colony (now British overseas territory) of Gibraltar between 1885 and 1940. It was the most read newspaper in Gibraltar and in the Campo de Gibraltar.
