= Teatro Cervantes de Almería =

Theatre and cinema in Almeria, Spain

Teatro Cervantes
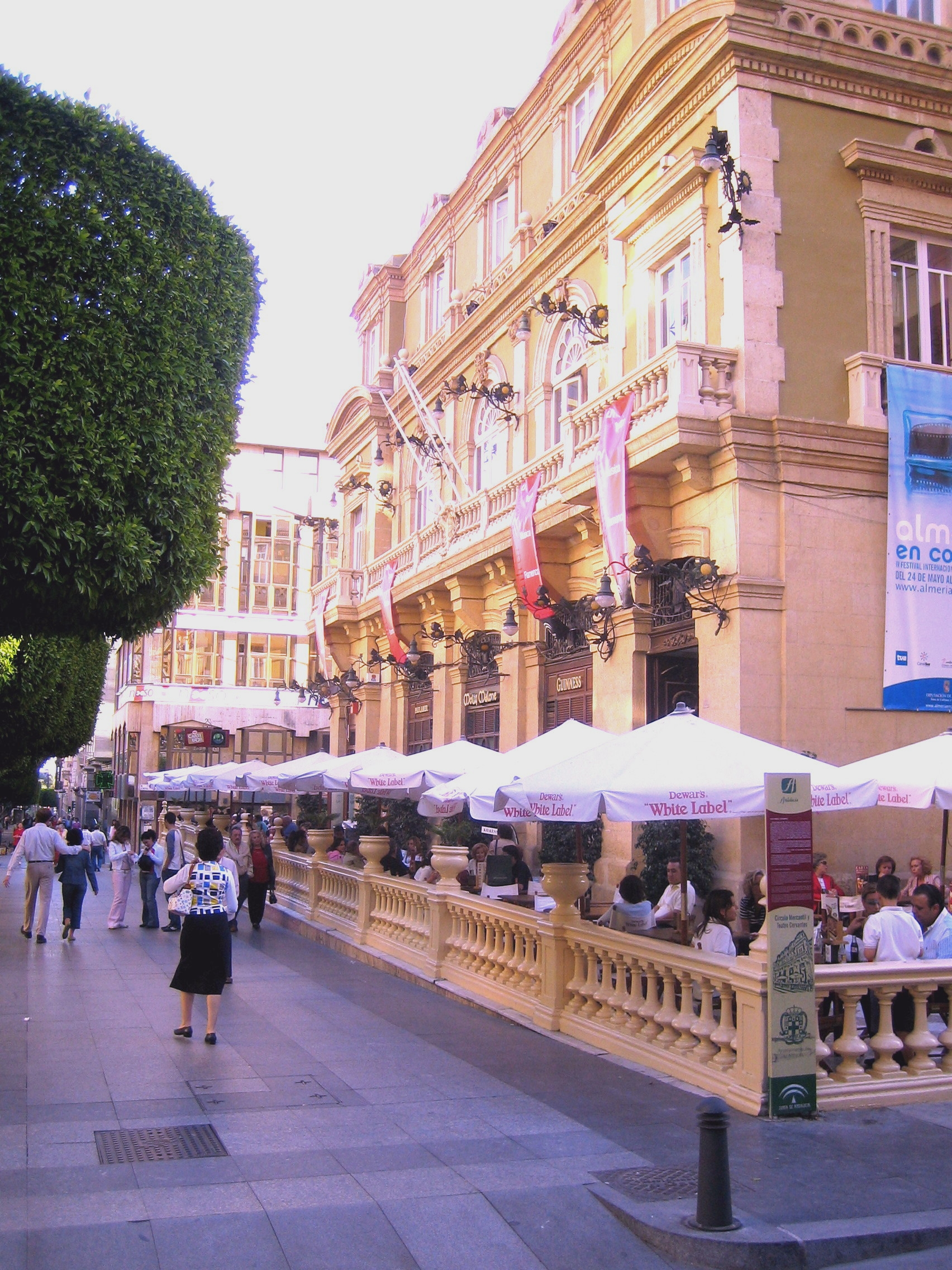
- Exterior of the theatre
- Interactive map of Teatro Cervantes
- Full name: Círculo Mercantil e Industrial y Teatro Cervantes
- Location: Almería
- Coordinates: 36°50′13.5″N 2°27′49.2″W
- Type: Theatre

Construction
- Built: 1898-1921
- Opened: 1921
- Architect: Enrique López Rull

Cervantes Theatre, or Teatro Cervantes de Almería is a theatre named after Miguel de Cervantes in the south-east Spanish province of Almería.

== Performances ==
In January 1922 actress Conchita Robles performed in Santa Isabel de Ceres, a tragedy by the Catalonian author Alfonso Vidal y Planas. She was killed from a gunshot that day by his spouse Carlos Berdugo, a cavalry commanding officer.

On 23 April 2017 the singer Mar Hernández gave a concert with his band, composed of Juanma Linde, Pepe Mañas, Jesús Morales, José Manuel Prada, Cesar Maldonado, Jordi Spuny and his father Francis Hernández. It also featured the guest artists Aitor Sáez and César Maldonado.

== Bibliography ==
- López López, Francisco Manuel (June 14, 2016). República, Guerra Civil y represión en Abla (Almería), 1931-1945. Universidad de Almería. p. 646. ISBN 9788416642205.
