= Gibraltar Chronicle =

Daily newspaper

Coordinates: 36.138836°N 5.352429°W

- Front page
- Type: Daily newspaper
- Format: Compact (Tabloid)
- Owner: Gibraltar Chronicle (Newspaper) Ltd
- Editor: Brian Reyes
- Photo editor: Johnny Bugeja
- Founded: 1801
- Language: English
- Headquarters: Watergate House, Gibraltar
- Circulation: 5,000
- Website: chronicle.gi

The Gibraltar Chronicle is a national newspaper published in Gibraltar since 1801. It became a daily in 1821. It is Gibraltar's oldest established daily newspaper and the world's second-oldest English language newspaper to have been in print continuously. Its editorial offices are at Watergate House, and the print works are in the New Harbours industrial estate.

== History ==
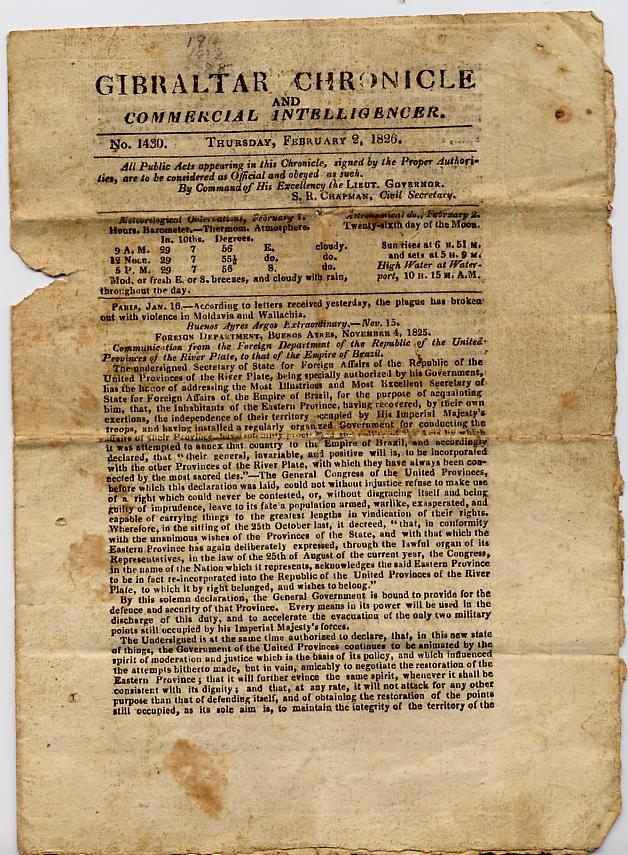
The Gibraltar Chronicle dated 2 February 1826

The Gibraltar Chronicle was born in direct relationship with the garrison. Casualty lists and news were slow in the 18th century and when five regiments from the Garrison of Gibraltar were promptly shipped to Egypt in 1801, the news was posted on a notice board in the Gibraltar Garrison Library. It was soon decided that the information should be made available to the public. A bulletin headed, "Continuation of the INTELLIGENCE FROM EGYPT received by His Majesty's ship Flora in three weeks from Alexandria," was printed at the Garrison Library press on 4 May 1801 and sold by H. and T. Cowper. The report consisted of four pages, three of which were in English and French. The news of Nelson's victory at Copenhagen appeared on the fourth page as well as the names of officers who had died since they had landed in Egypt. The second edition was printed on 8 May 1801. The first editor was a Frenchman named Charles Bouisson, who had settled in Gibraltar in 1794.

The last of the Gibraltar Chronicle to be numbered in Roman numerals was number 160 (CLX) of 22 September 1804. Publication then ceased for five months owing to the yellow fever epidemic until number 161 appeared on 23 March 1805, and it afterwards continued to be published weekly in editions bearing Arabic numerals.

The first 160 editions carried verbatim extracts from The London Gazette, Spanish, French (in original or translation) and Russian, Court papers, Parliamentary debates, and proclamations, military and naval dispatches, local regulations, rates of exchange and reports culled from foreign newspapers. They carried few letters, advertisements or details of social occasions except those connected with the Royal Court and the activities of the members of the Garrison. Therefore, in those days, the Chronicle included little or no local content. The Chronicle was sold at a price of 1 1/2 reals, and the readership was mostly made up of serving officials.

The Chronicle did not lose its military character until well into the twentieth century. It is currently owned by an independent local trust.

== News on victory of Trafalgar ==
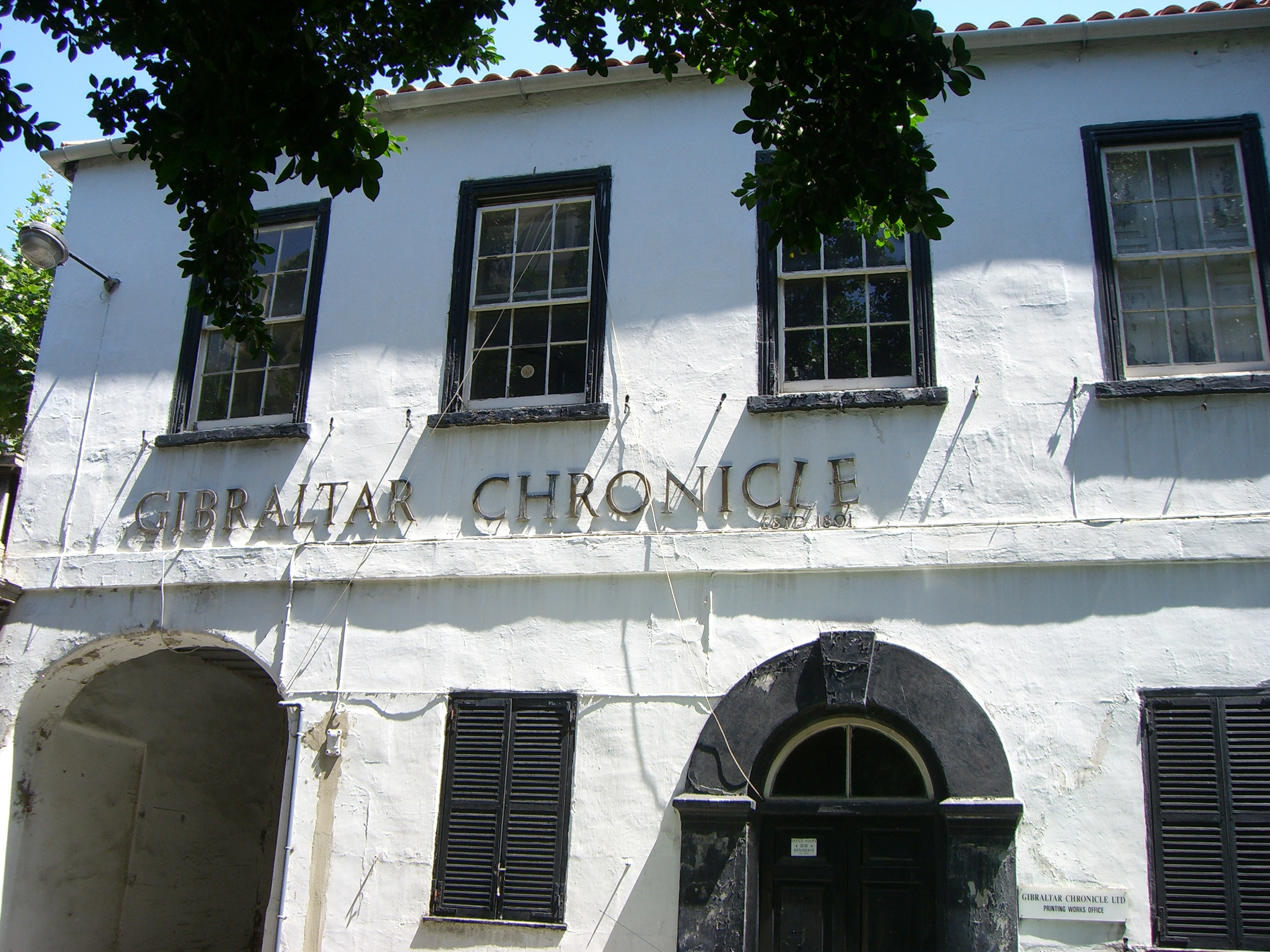
Gibraltar Chronicle printers.

The Gibraltar Chronicle published the news of the victory of Trafalgar on 23 October, i.e. only two days after the event, in English and French, and included a letter from Admiral Collingwood to the Governor of Gibraltar Henry Edward Fox, giving an account of the battle. It had received the news so quickly, because the British fleet had met a day after the battle with a fishing boat that brought a report from Admiral Collingwood to Gibraltar. Five days after the Battle of Trafalgar in October 1805, Cuthbert Collingwood, 1st Baron Collingwood sent news of the victory also to Lieutenant Lapenotiere, commander of a small schooner Pickle, which was en route to England. Prime Minister, William Pitt, and King George III did not have news of the victory until the early hours of 6 November, consequently delaying publication in The Times until 7 November.

SUPPLEMENT TO THE GIBRALTAR CHRONICLE, SATURDAY, NOVEMBER 2, 1805. – (PRICE ONE REAL AND A HALF.) (A later French Translation of the following Particulars will be published on Thursday next.) GIBRALTAR, NOVEMBER 2, 1805. this first copy of the Supplement, in English. The supplement a detailed narrative of Nelson's actions during the engagement (including the famed telegraph "ENGLAND expects that every man will do his duty.

Still nearly a week in advance of the news reaching London, the Chronicle prints the first full account of the circumstances of Nelson’s actions at the Battle of Trafalgar, as well as reliable first-hand accounts of events which were later "modified" in the retelling. The earliest possible reliable account for many "facts" which have become, in one form or another, legend.

== Archives ==
Only two complete, or almost complete, sets of the Gibraltar Chronicle are known to exist and both are in Gibraltar. The Garrison Library holds a complete series from 1801 which includes the famous Trafalgar "scoop" edition. The library announced in 2020 that it was planning the digitisation of its newspaper collection. A near-complete set, from which only the first few years are missing, can be found at the Gibraltar Archives.

== See also ==
- Communications in Gibraltar
- Jon Morgan Searle
