= Monte Bignone =

Mountain in Italy

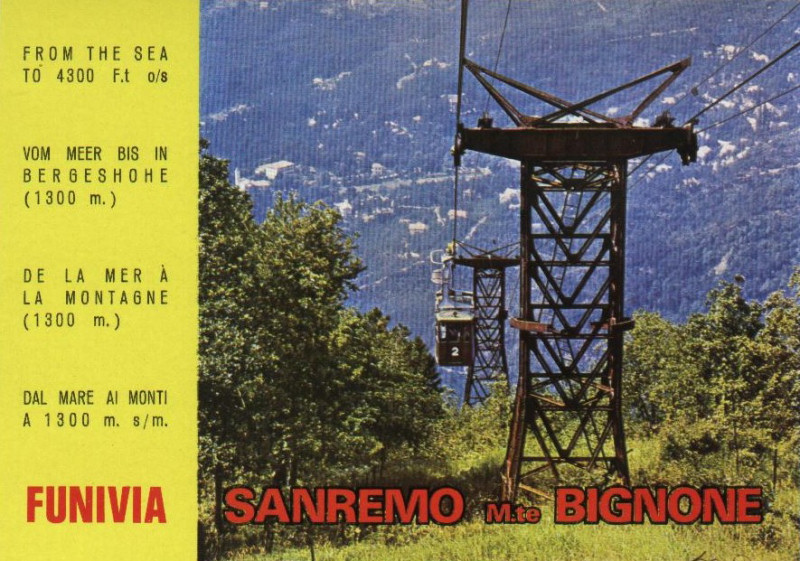

Highest point
- Elevation: 1,299 m (4,262 ft)
- Prominence: 401 m (1,316 ft)
- Coordinates: 43°52′16″N 07°44′18″E

Geography
- Location within Alps
- Location: Liguria, Italy
- Parent range: Ligurian Alps

Monte Bignone is a mountain in Liguria, northern Italy, part of the Ligurian Alps. It is located in the province of Imperia near Sanremo. It lies at an altitude of 1299 metres and lies within the San Romolo Natural Park.

== SOIUSA classification ==
According to the SOIUSA (International Standardized Mountain Subdivision of the Alps) the mountain can be classified in the following way:

- main part = Western Alps
- major sector = South Western Alps
- section = Ligurian Alps
- subsection = Alpi del Marguareis
- supergroup = Catena del Saccarello
- group = Gruppo del Monte Saccarello
- subgroup = Costiera Ceppo-Bignone
- code = I/A-1.II-A.1.e

== Nature conservation ==
The mountain and its surrounding area are included in a SIC (Site of Community Importance) called Monte Nero - Monte Bignone (code: IT1315806 ).
