= Gibraltar National Day =

National day in 10 September

Coordinates: 36.144802°N 5.352923°W

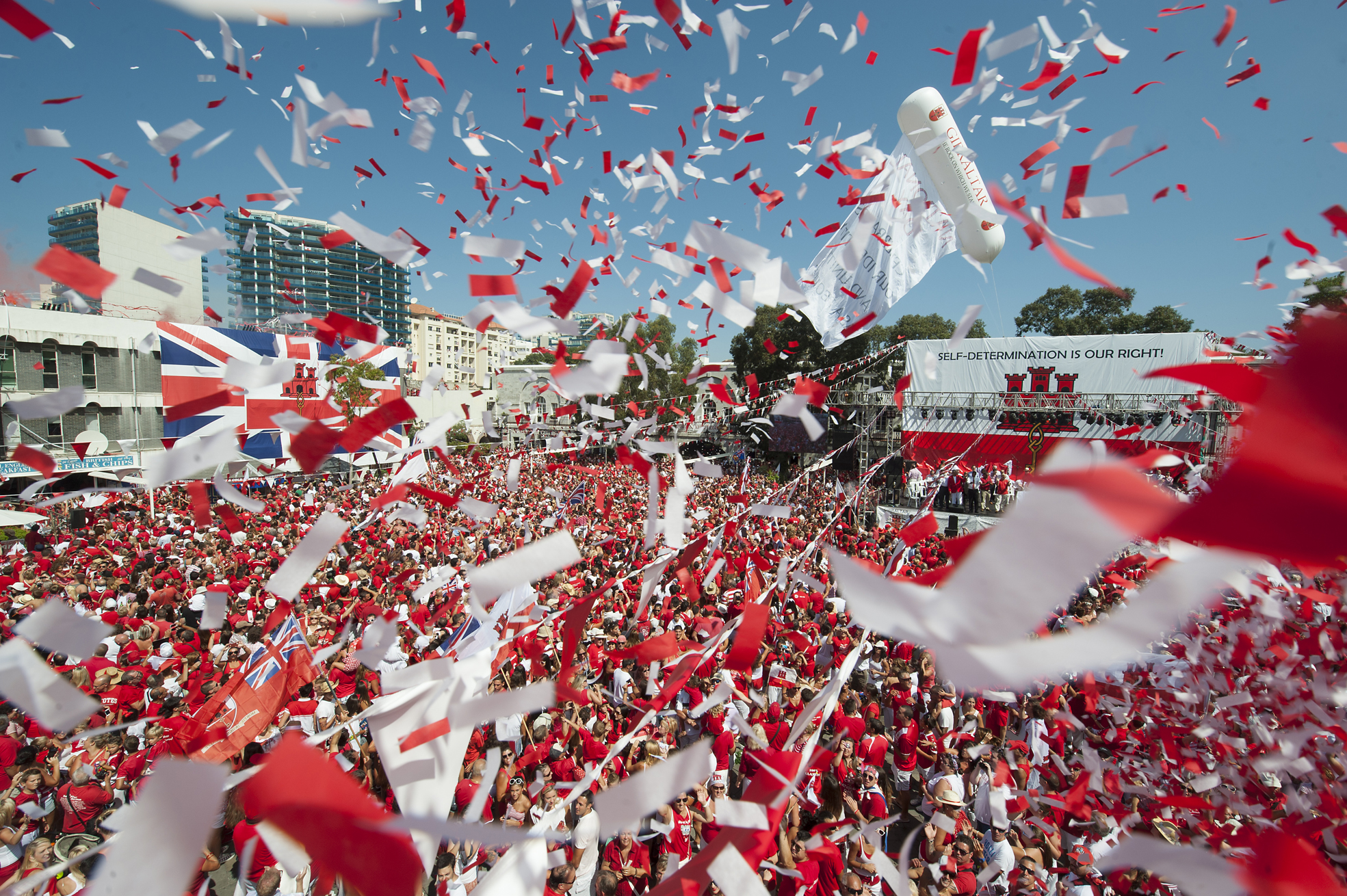
- 2013 National Day celebrations held at Grand Casemates Square
- Also called: Gibraltar National Day
- Observed by: Gibraltarian people
- Type: National Day; Cultural; Historical; Political
- Celebrations: Street party, Verbenas, Street food, Barbecues, Competitions, Family reunions, Foam party, Concerts, Fireworks
- Date: 10 September
- Next time: 10 September 2027
- Frequency: annual
- Related to: Gibraltar Tercentenary Celebrations

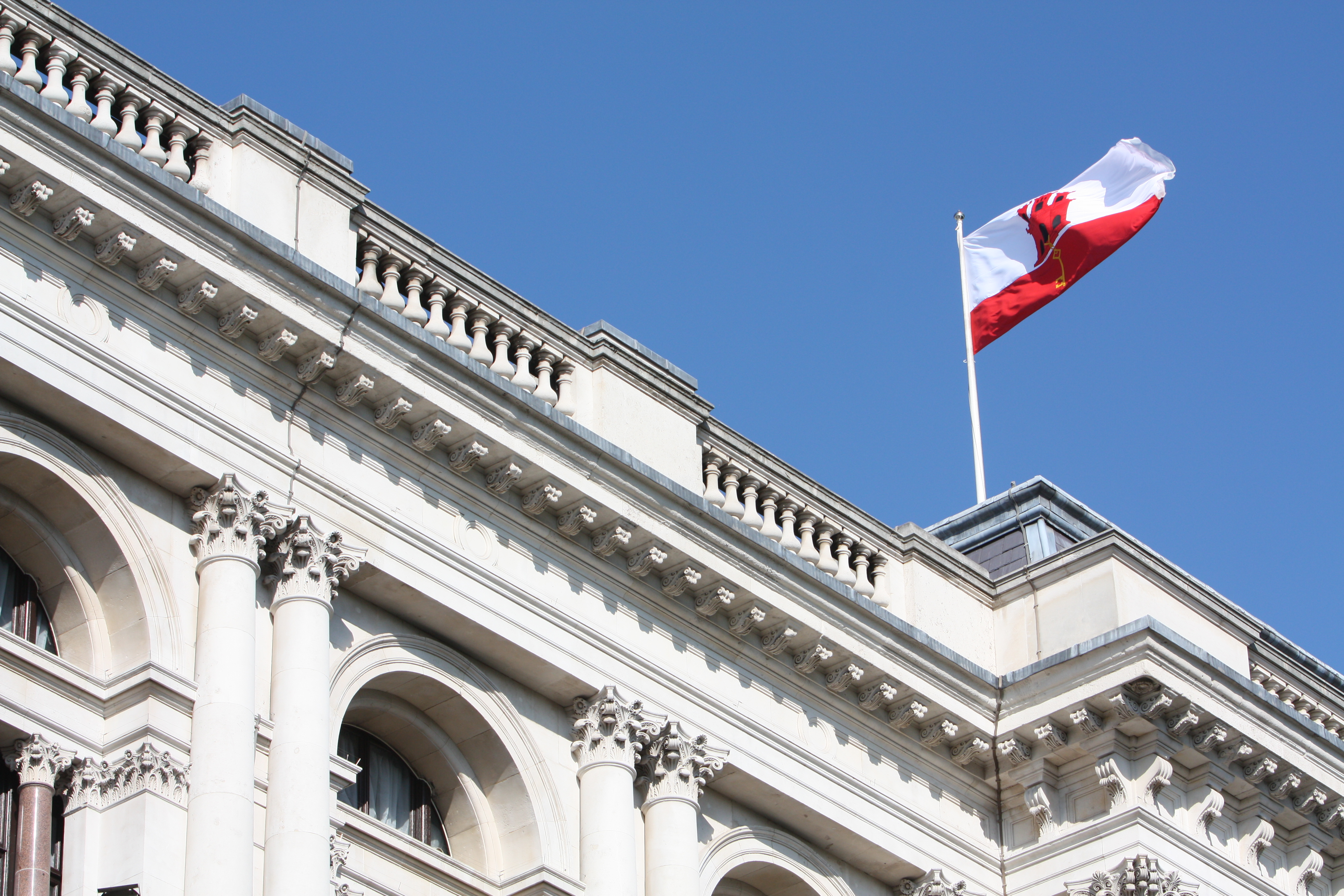
Flag of Gibraltar flying over the Foreign and Commonwealth Office in London during the 2013 National Day

Gibraltar National Day, celebrated annually on 10 September, is the official National Day of the British overseas territory of Gibraltar. The day commemorates Gibraltar's first sovereignty referendum of 1967, in which Gibraltarian voters were asked whether they wished to either pass under Spanish sovereignty, or remain under British sovereignty, with institutions of self-government.

== History ==
In 1992, the Chief Minister of Gibraltar Joe Bossano, travelled to the United Nations to argue for the right to self-determination inspiring the formation of the Self Determination for Gibraltar Group (SDGG) which was at the time headed by Dennis Matthews, a one-time active member of the Integration with Britain Party (IWBP). To generate popular support for self-determination they held the first National Day at John Mackintosh Square (the Piazza) on 10 September 1992 to commemorate the 25th anniversary of the day the 1967 sovereignty referendum was held on. Coincidentally, the 10 September was also the day the Gibraltar Legislative Council became representative and responsible for internal affairs in 1964.

The first National Day was so successful that the avalanche of people that spontaneously turned up could not fit into John Mackintosh Square. The Government then took the responsibility of providing some help organising the event, since it fostered the right to self-determination that the Gibraltarians had been demanding at the United Nations since 1963. Therefore, the Government declared the 10 September a public holiday and gave the SDGG a grant for them to administer. In 1993 the venue was changed to the larger Grand Casemates Square, until it was again changed in 1998 to the even larger Naval Ground. However, in 2017 in commemoration of the 50th anniversary of the 1967 referendum, the venue returned to Grand Casemates Square.

=== National identity ===
The active opposition of the Spanish Government to self-determination combined with the negative posture of the Foreign and Commonwealth Office, strengthened the resolution of the vast majority of the Gibraltarians to press ahead for their decolonisation by the year 2000 in accordance with the high principles of the Charter and the target date set by the United Nations to eradicate colonialism.

Instead, the British Foreign Secretary Jack Straw, proposed joint sovereignty with Spain, which further intensified the sense of national identity reinforced by the National Day.

The 10th National Day, held in 2001 included a speech by William Serfaty, the then leader of the SDGG, which stressed the themes of national identity, unity, resisting Spanish pressure and decolonisation.

=== Changes to format ===
Subsequent National Days have comparatively been quieter affairs with fewer invited guests and shorter political speeches. In 2007 the running of the political rally was taken over by the Government from the SDGG. In July 2008 the Government announced they would change the format of National Day to take effect the same year. The main change was their decision to no longer organise a political rally. The reason given was to emphasise civic celebration of Gibraltar rather than political revindication. Other changes included relocating the main event to the smaller John Mackintosh Square from Grand Casemates Square, appointing the Mayor of Gibraltar to conduct the main event rather than any political leader, the presentation of the Gibraltar Medallion of Honour and the reading of the Gibraltar National Day Declaration.

== Observances ==
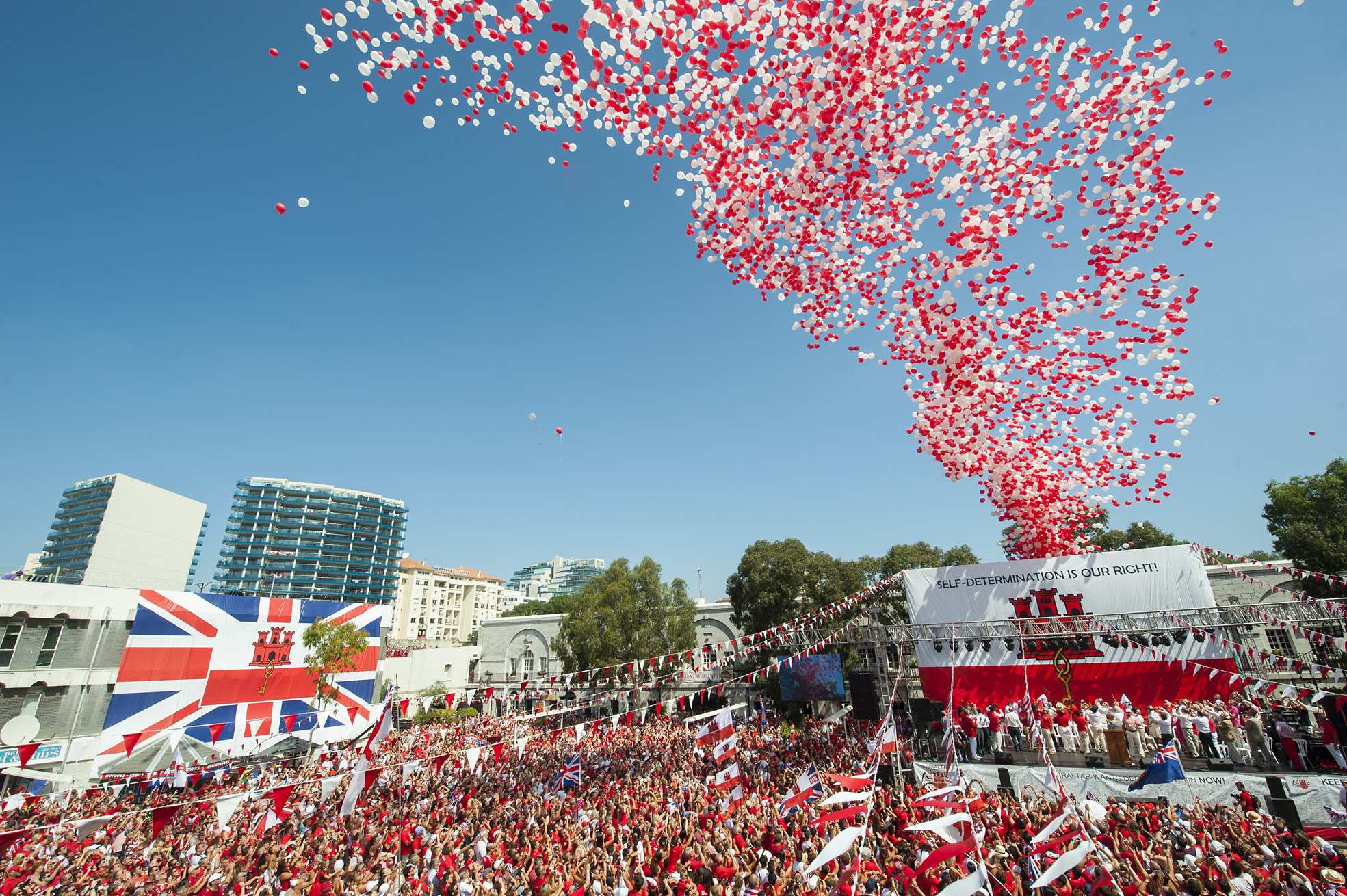
The symbolic release of 30,000 red and white balloons from Grand Casemates Square on National Day 2013

The official Gibraltar National Day events begin with a children's fancy dress competition held at the lobby of the Parliament building in Main Street followed by a street party at John Mackintosh Square where food and drink stalls are set up providing Gibraltarian food such as calentita. Later a selected school choir sings songs with a Gibraltar theme, namely Llévame Donde Nací and Virgencita de Europa. This is followed by the main event, the Mayor's recitation of the names of the recipients of the Gibraltar Medallion of Honour and the reading of the Gibraltar National Day Declaration from atop the City Hall's balcony. This was previously followed by the traditional release from atop the Parliament building of 30,000 red and white balloons, representing Gibraltar's population, which had featured on this day since 1992. The balloon release tradition has been ended in 2016 due to the threat that it poses to wildlife, marine wildlife in particular. In the meantime, the school choir leads the general public in the singing of the Gibraltar Anthem.

A funday for children featuring bouncy castles and fairground rides is then held at Grand Casemates Square. There is live music is played all afternoon at Governor's Parade (the Piazzella) and the Rock on the Rock Club, all free of charge, as opposed to the Gibraltar Music Festival a paid event leading up to national day.

Since 2007, there has been a verbena for the older members of the community.

The day culminates with a half-hour-long synchronised fireworks display released from the Detached Mole in the Gibraltar Harbour at night followed by a rock concert.

== Political rally ==
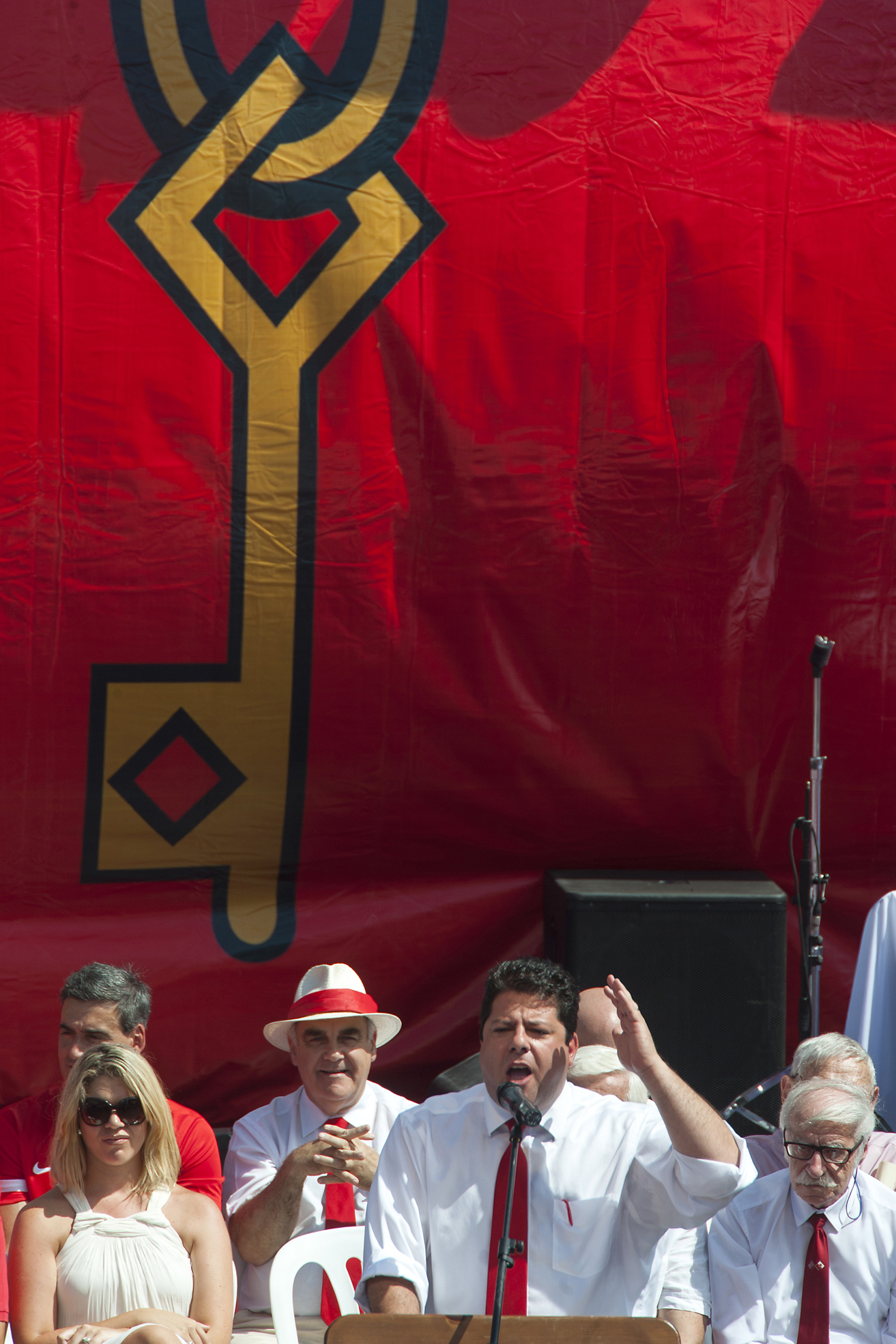
Chief Minister Fabian Picardo delivering his speech during the 2013 National Day political rally

In 2008, the Government announced that it would change the format of Gibraltar National Day celebrations with effect from this year. This followed the new Constitution in which Britain recognised Gibraltar's right to self-determination. The changes to the format were intended to emphasise Gibraltar's civic celebration rather than political revindication. There would be a gathering of the community at John Mackintosh Square for a collective celebratory event.

The SDGG returned from its state of inactivity and organised a political rally at Grand Casemates Square featuring the leader of the SDGG, and those of the Opposition political parties: Liberal Party of Gibraltar and the Progressive Democratic Party. The event was scheduled to last a maximum of 30–45 minutes, allowing those participating to attend the main event of civic functions held at John Mackintosh Square. Speeches were short (around 5 minutes) kept to the leader of the SDGG and those of the other three parties. The event was well attended and seen as a success.

The GSD Government did not send a representative as they considered the main rally held at John Mackintosh Square to be the only official one.

== Gibraltar Medallion of Honour ==
In July 2008, the Chief Minister of Gibraltar, Peter Caruana announced that the Government would establish a civic award scheme, to be known as the Gibraltar Medallion of Honour, which would be awarded by Parliament. The award is formally presented annually by the Mayor of Gibraltar prior to the release of the balloons on Gibraltar National Day.

=== 2009 recipients ===
The 2009 recipients of the Gibraltar Medallion of Honour were:

- Jose Netto – for services to trade unionism and workers;
- Adolfo Canepa – for public services and services to politics;
- Joseph Gaggero – for services to aviation, shipping, business and commerce;
- Maurice Xiberras – for public services and services to politics.

== Declaration ==
Since 2008, a Gibraltar National Day declaration is read by the Mayor of Gibraltar at a civic rally held at outside the City Hall. It was first read out publicly by Mayor Solomon Levy.
