= Gaggero =

Gaggero is a surname. Notable people with the surname include:

- Eleonora Gaggero (born 2001), Italian actress and author
- Jorge Gaggero, Argentinian film director and screenwriter
- Joseph Gaggero (1927–2012), Gibraltarian businessman
- Luigi Gaggero (born 1976), Italian percussionist, conductor and academic teacher
- James Gaggero (born 1959), businessman
