= Main Guard (Gibraltar) =

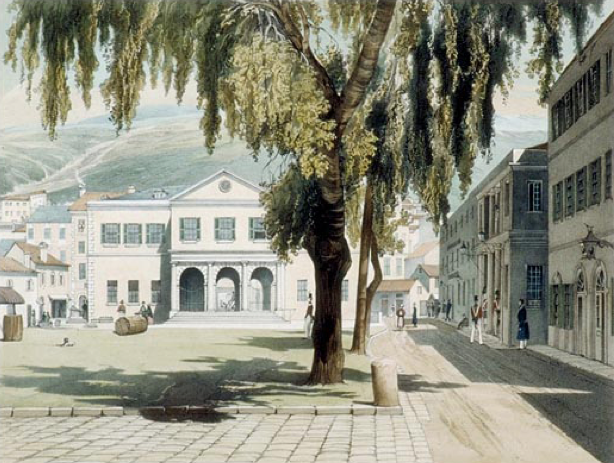
- 1830s painting by Dibdin depicting Commercial Square, with the Exchange and Commercial Library (center, left) and the Main Guard (right, side view).

- Location within Gibraltar

General information
- Type: Guardhouse
- Architectural style: Georgian
- Location: 13 John Mackintosh Square, Gibraltar
- Coordinates: 36.14062°N 5.354147°W
- Current tenants: Gibraltar Heritage Trust
- Owner: Government of Gibraltar

The Main Guard is a historic, 18th-century guardhouse in the British Overseas Territory of Gibraltar. While the exact date of its construction is unknown, it is the oldest building in John Mackintosh Square. The French artist Henri Regnault produced three paintings while a visitor at the Main Guard. After being displayed at the guardhouse for many years, they are now kept at the Gibraltar National Museum. The building's function has changed with the centuries. The Main Guard first served as a guardhouse; in the 20th century, it functioned as a fire station, bath house, and government offices. Since 2001, the building has housed the Gibraltar Heritage Trust and underwent restoration in 2011. It hosts the tourist information office of Gibraltar.

== The first 100 years ==
The Main Guard is a historic building in Gibraltar, the British Overseas Territory at the southern end of the Iberian Peninsula. It is located on the south end of what is now known as John Mackintosh Square, near Gibraltar City Hall, formerly referred to as Connaught House. While the exact date of its construction is unknown, the Main Guard building is the oldest in the square. The first references to the building are found in documents which date to the mid-18th century. In 1748, a Gibraltar visitor who stayed at an inn on the Parade, a former name for John Mackintosh Square, wrote that the "grand guard house" was near his hotel and that it was "one of the neatest buildings" in the area. He described it as "but one storey high" which, based on his observation, was the usual height of the buildings in Gibraltar. He further related that in front of the guardhouse, on the Parade, was a "whipping post, where almost every day soldiers are brought to feel the scourge." Floggings were meted out at the Parade as a form of military punishment.

In the mid-18th century, John Mackintosh Square was used as a parade ground known as the Parade. The building is shown in a plan drawn in 1750, but published in 1770, and referred to as the Main Guard Room. On a 1753 plan of the Parade, it was labelled as the Main Guard. Its location near the King's Bastion meant that it sustained extensive damage during the Great Siege of Gibraltar (1779–1783). The second storey present today was likely added when the guardhouse was rebuilt. In an 1830s image of Commercial Square, another previous name for John Mackintosh Square, the building is shown with two storeys. The 1830s painting (pictured above) by British artist Thomas Colman Dibdin (1810 – 1893) shows the Main Guard with officers stationed outside, as well as the nearby Exchange and Commercial Library on the eastern side of the square. Every evening, the sentries in Gibraltar would receive their assignments at the Main Guard. Early 19th-century regulations in Gibraltar required that any inhabitant wandering in the streets after midnight without a permit was to be transferred to the Main Guard. In addition, any inebriated soldier in the city was to be sent to that same guardhouse.

== More recent history ==
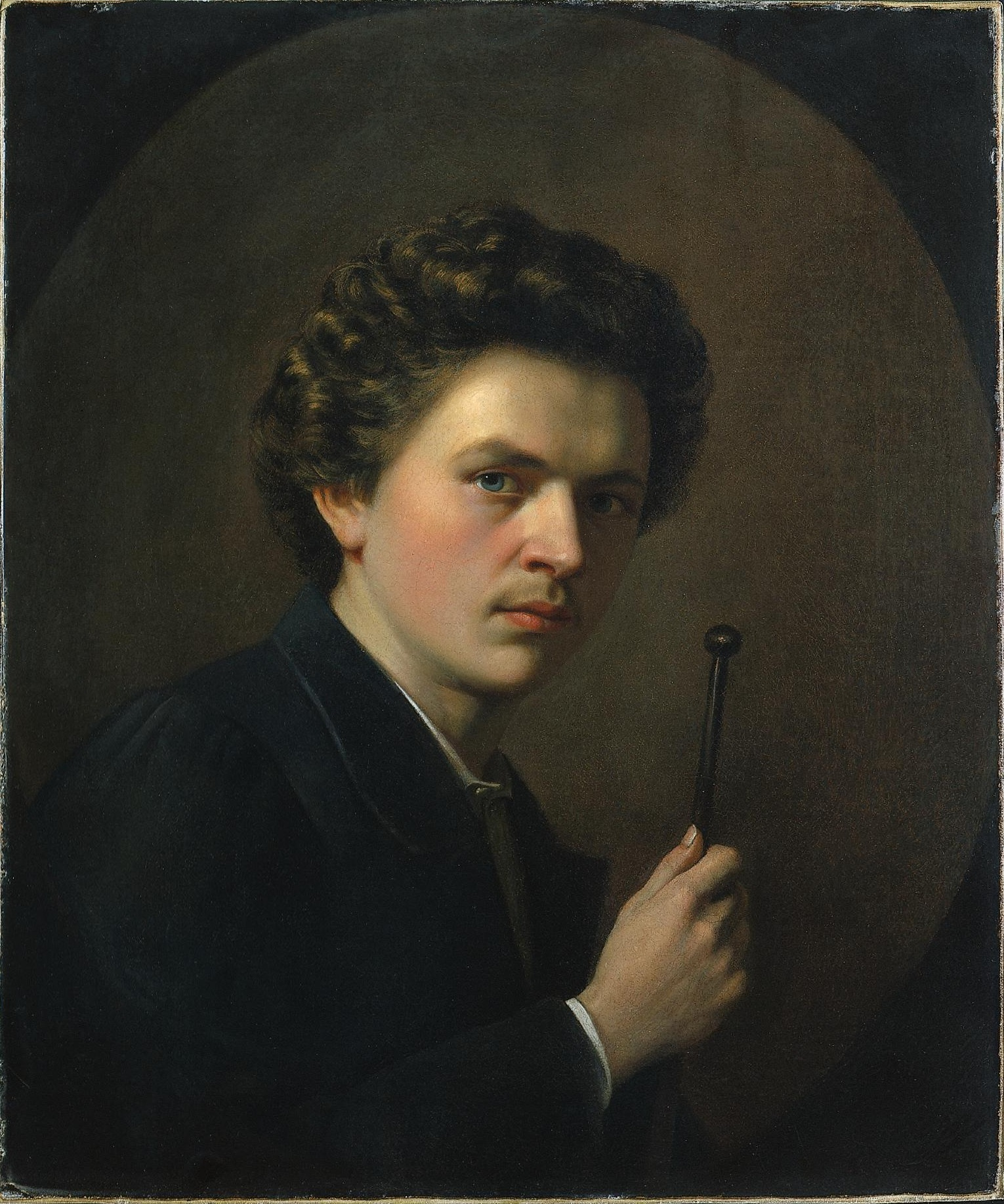
Self-portrait of Henri Regnault (1843–1871), c. 1863.

The French painter Henri Regnault (30 October 1843 – 19 January 1871), a native of Paris, was a frequent visitor to the Main Guard in the late 1860s, as he was a friend of the officers. The artist (pictured at left) produced three paintings for the officers which, after being displayed at the guardhouse for many years, were removed for restoration and their current location is unknown. Other museums which hold his works include the Musée d'Orsay, the Cleveland Museum of Art, and the Metropolitan Museum of Art. Regnault died at the Battle of Buzenval in 1871 at the age of 27, defending his country in the Franco-Prussian War. Later that century, in 1885, the Gibraltar Directory indicated that the guardhouse at Commercial Square had its guardroom and cells on the ground floor and the officers' room on the second floor. At the time of the 1896 directory, the building was still being used as a guardhouse.

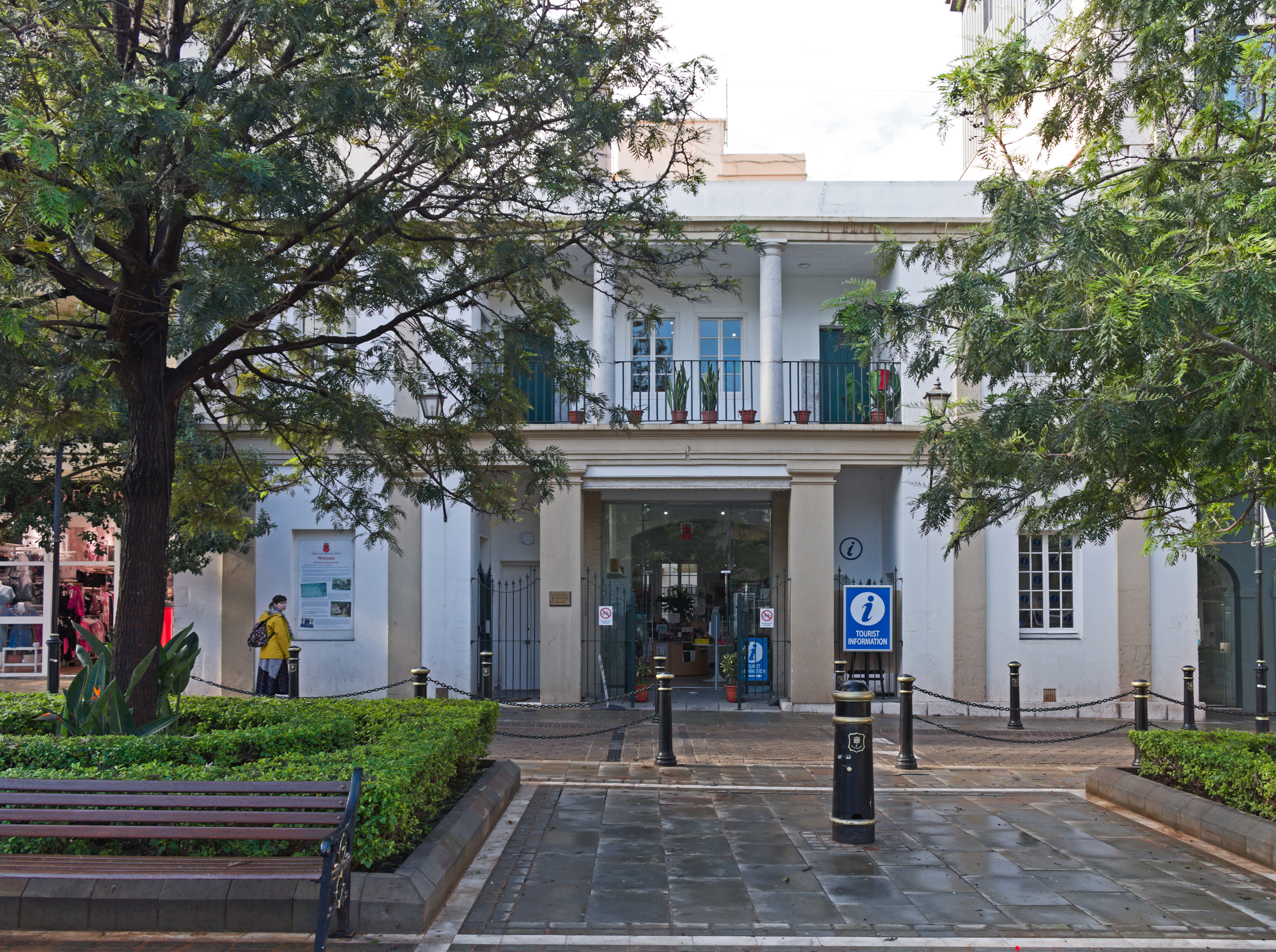
Main Guard in 2022

By 1911, however, the building was no longer a guardhouse. Until late 1920, it was home to the Military Foot Police, and, from February 1921 to March 1938, the building served as the City Fire Station. After the construction of a new main fire station on Alameda Square in 1938, plans were developed to demolish the Main Guard and replace it with a new Art Deco-style building to house the Public Health Department. The plans were set aside at start of World War II.

Later in the 20th century, the Main Guard was used as government offices for licensing and payment of bills. Since 2001, the Main Guard has been headquarters for the Gibraltar Heritage Trust. In early 2011, the Friends of Gibraltar, also known as the Friends of Gibraltar Heritage Society, pledged to contribute £10,000 to assist in the restoration of the Main Guard.
