= Main Guard =

Main Guard may refer to:

- Main Guard (Clonmel)
- Main Guard (Gibraltar)
- Main Guard (Valletta)
