= Gibraltar Medallion of Honour =

- Location: Gibraltar City Hall
- Country: Gibraltar
- Presented by: Mayor of Gibraltar
- First award: 2008
- Currently held by: See Recipients

The Gibraltar Medallion of Honour (GMH) is a civil award scheme established by the Government of the British overseas territory of Gibraltar. Its creation was announced in July 2008 by Chief Minister of Gibraltar, Peter Caruana. It ranks below the Freedom of the City of Gibraltar.

== Award ==
The Gibraltar Medallion of Honour was created by a motion of the Gibraltar Parliament on the 18 July 2008 and is awarded annually by the Gibraltar Parliament on "living or deceased Gibraltarians and others who the Parliament considers have served and contributed to the interests of Gibraltar and its people in an exceptional manner that is particularly worthy of special recognition by the House on behalf of the people of Gibraltar".

Once approved by Parliament, the awards are officially announced by the Mayor of Gibraltar on Gibraltar National Day. The Mayor then presents the recipients with the Medallions in a private ceremony held at a later date.

In July 2011, the Gibraltar Parliament passed a motion allowing all Medallion recipients to use the post-nominal letters GMH after their name.

== Recipients ==
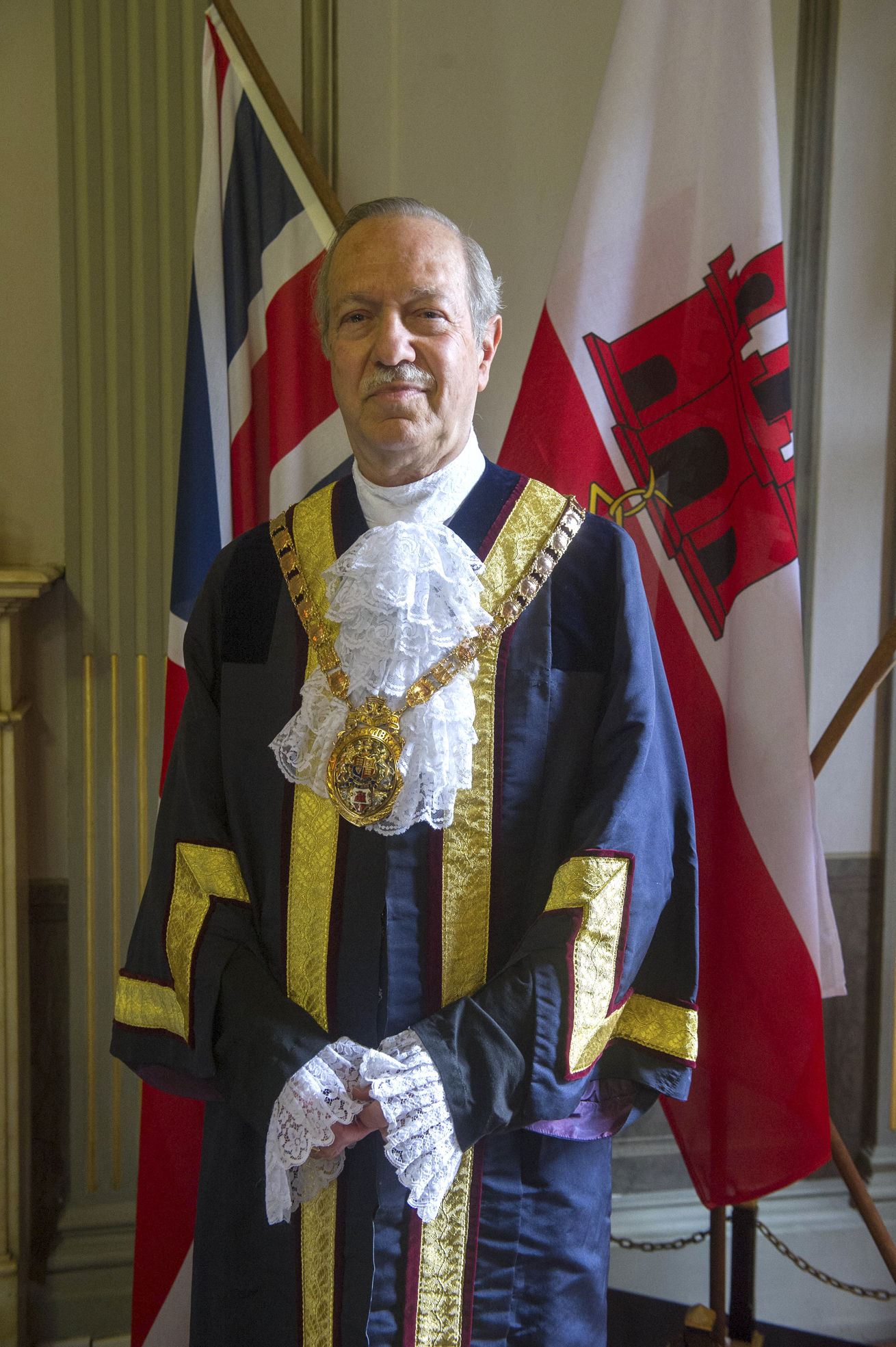
Former Chief Minister of Gibraltar, Adolfo Canepa, recipient of the Gibraltar Medallion of Honour in 2009.

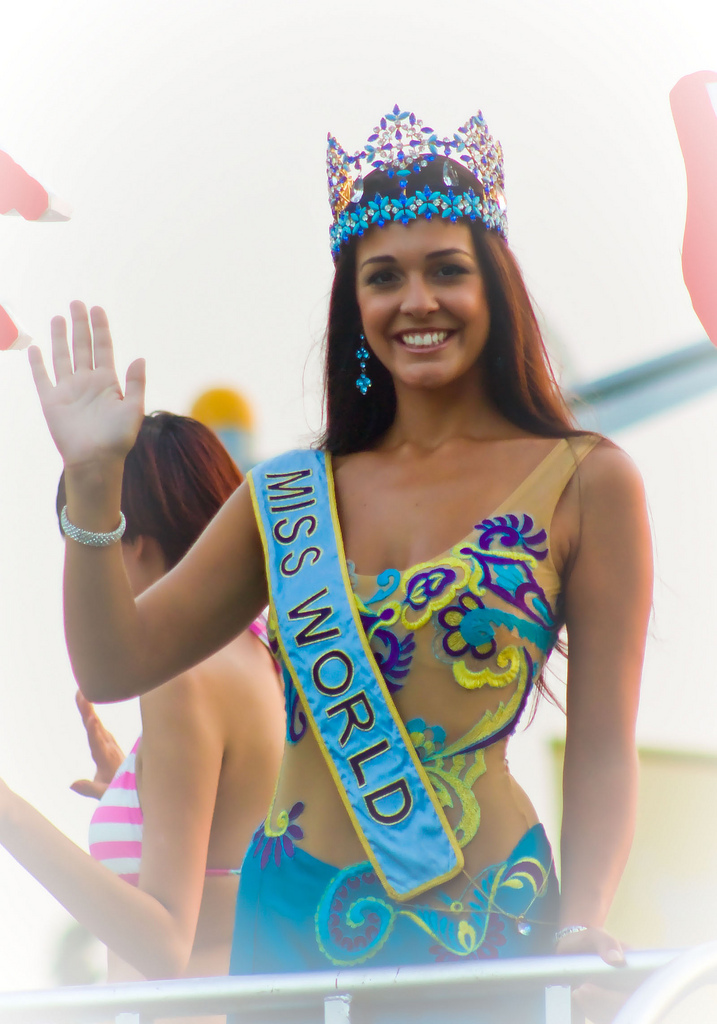
Miss World 2009, Kaiane Aldorino, recipient of the Gibraltar Medallion of Honour in 2011.

=== 2008 ===
Upon the award's establishment, the Gibraltar Medallion of Honour was bestowed, posthumously, upon the following persons:

- Albert Risso – for services to trade unionism.
- Jacobo Azagury – for services to the arts.
- Rudecindo Mannia – for services to the arts.
- Sir Howard Davis – for public service
- William Gomez – for services to music.
- Joseph Pitaluga – for public service.
- Dorothy Ellicott – for public service and service to heritage.
- Manolo Mascarenhas – for service to broadcasting.
- John Mackintosh – for philanthropy.
- Peter Isola – for services to politics.
- Aaron Cardozo – for services to Gibraltar.

=== 2009 ===
The 2009 recipients of the Gibraltar Medallion of Honour were:

- Jose Netto – for services to trade unionism and workers.
- Adolfo Canepa, (former Chief Minister) – for public services and services to politics.
- Joseph Gaggero – for services to aviation, shipping, business and commerce.
- Maurice Xiberras – for public services and services to politics.

=== 2010 ===
The 2010 sole recipient of the Gibraltar Medallion of Honour was:

- Bernard Linares – for services to religion, trade unionism, education, public service and politics.

=== 2011 ===
The 2011 sole recipient of the Gibraltar Medallion of Honour was:

- Kaiane Aldorino – for personal achievement in becoming Miss World 2009.

=== 2013 ===
The 2013 sole recipient of the Gibraltar Medallion of Honour was:

- Perry Stieglitz – for his work defending Gibraltar's rights from the Gibraltar office in Washington

=== 2014 ===
The 2014 recipients of the Gibraltar Medallion of Honour were:

- Ernest Montado CBE – for services to the public service and politics
- John Alcantara CBE – for services to the law and politics
- Aurelio Montegriffo CBE – for services to politics
- Albert Poggio OBE – for representing Gibraltar in the United Kingdom and amongst other UK Overseas Territories

The 2014 recipients of the Gibraltar Medallion of Distinction were:

- Ernest Lima – for services to public health
- Dennis Matthews – for services to the people of Gibraltar
- Fortunato Azopardi – founding member of the Self-Determination for Gibraltar Group
- Adelaide Canessa MBE – for services to education
- Kevin Dobson (posthumous) – for services to education
- Lionel Perez – for services to education and culture
- Julio Alcantara MBE – for services to the administration of education
- Eugene Howes – for public service
- Dennis Figueras – for public service
- John Desoisa – for public service
- Melvyn Farrell – for public service
- Annie Risso – for her work in the establishment and development of the Special Olympics movement in Gibraltar
- Charles Conroy – for his work in the establishment and development of martial arts in Gibraltar
- Charles Flower – MBE BEM – for service to Sport
- Eloise Mañasco – for her outstanding sporting achievements in Air Rifle shooting
- Nathan Stagno – for his outstanding achievements in international umpiring
- Joseph Hernandez – for services to sports
- John Gonçalves – for service to Basketball
- Christian Santos – for services to popular culture
- Elio Victor – for services to young people
- Marisa Desoiza – for services to Cancer Relief charities
- Tobie Roosevelt – for services to Gibraltar in the Gibraltar American Council

=== 2015 ===
The 2015 recipients of the Gibraltar Medallion of Honour were:

- James Levy CBE KC – for serving and contributing to the interests of Gibraltar and its people in an exceptional manner in particular for their services to the Community in the economic development of Gibraltar.
- George Bassadone OBE – for serving and contributing to the interests of Gibraltar and its people in an exceptional manner in particular for their services to the Community in the economic development of Gibraltar.
- John Bassadone OBE – for serving and contributing to the interests of Gibraltar and its people in an exceptional manner in particular for their services to the Community in the economic development of Gibraltar.
- Felix Pizzarello CBE – for his service to the public service in various ranks of the judiciary.
- Anthony Dudley – for his service to the Community in various ranks of the judiciary and marking his appointment as the first Gibraltarian Chief Justice.
- Joe Garcia MBE – for his service to the Community in the fields of journalism and publishing.
- Juan Carlos Perez – for his service to the Trade Union movement, politics, HM Government of Gibraltar and the development of telecommunications.

The 2015 recipients of the Gibraltar Medallion of Distinction were:

- Joe Schembri – for service to the sporting community in particular the Commonwealth Games Association in Gibraltar.
- Mark Randall – for his service to the Royal Gibraltar Regiment and in particular his contribution to the Royal Gibraltar Regiment Benevolent Fund and other charities.
- Mark Miles – for the international promotion of Gibraltar through outstanding professional achievement in his service to His Holiness the Pope, Pope Francis.
- James Felices – for services to the youth and in particular the Cheshire Homes in Morocco.
- Humbert Hernandez – for the successful abolition of conscription and the establishment of the Action Group for the Abolition of Conscription as well as the recording of that period in the history of Gibraltar in his book on the subject, Conscript or Convict.
- Alfred Cortes – for the successful abolition of conscription and the establishment of the Action Group for the Abolition of Conscription.
- Henry Pinna – for the promotion of the rights of those seeking housing in through Action for Housing.
- Tommy Finlayson MBE – for services in the recording of the history of Gibraltar.
- Joe Gingell – for the recording of the history of the evacuation of Gibraltar and to local charities.
- Juaquin Bensusan MBE – for services to the Gibraltar Museum.
- George Palao BEM (deceased) – for services to the recording of the history of Gibraltar.
- William Serfaty – for the promotion of the right to self-determination of the People of Gibraltar.
- Joey Gabay (deceased) – for services in activism in defence of the rights of the political rights of the People of Gibraltar.
- Joseph "Pepe" Romero – for services to education as the first Gibraltarian headmaster of Bayside School.
- Mario Arroyo – for services to education and the arts.
- Robert Balban BEM – for services to the youth of Gibraltar and to local charities.
- Leslie Zammitt MBE (deceased) – for services to education and the performing arts.
- Jenny Montegriffo – for services to education, latterly as Headmistress (now retired) of St Paul's School.
- Henry Sacramento – for services to the community, in particular community policing, and the arts.
- Mariola Summerfield MBE – for creating awareness of women's issues
- Carmen Gomez for outstanding achievements in the performing arts.
- Brian Callaghan OBE for services to tourism in the hotel industry.
- Ernest Francis (Sr) – for services to tourism in the hotel industry.
- James Bossino – for services to tourism in the hotel industry.
- Georgina Cassar – for outstanding representation of Gibraltar in sport, in Rhythmic Gymnastics, as part of the United Kingdom Olympic Team in 2012.
- Chris Walker – for services to Sport, in particular the Triathlon, and the outstanding representation of Gibraltar in international competitions including becoming World Champion in this sport.
- Arturo Taylor – for services to sport, in particular shooting.
- Joe Santos – for services to sport, in particular swimming and the coaching thereof.
- Anthony Avellano – for services to sports journalism.
- John Shepherd Snr – for services to sports journalism.
- A B Massias – for his contribution to the economy of Gibraltar through property development.
- Louis Peralta – for his contribution to the economy of Gibraltar through property development.
- Lucio Randall – for his contribution to the development of telecommunications as managing director of Gibtel.
- Charlie Fortunato – for his contribution to the development of telecommunications as managing director of Gibraltar Nynex Communications.
- James Ferro MBE – for his services to the development of the Port in Gibraltar and the welfare of seamen.
- Robert Goldwin MBE – for services to the Community in his role in the Public Services Commission.
- Douglas Harrison – for his services to patients with kidney problems.
- Salvador Perez – for services to the Royal Gibraltar Regiment Association as its chairman.
- Rene Beguelin – for services to medicine and charities.
- Olivier Wasnaire – for services to Gibraltar in the establishment and maintenance of a presence in Brussels.
- Solomon Levy MBE ED JP FRICS – for services to Gibraltar in the promotion of intercommunity understanding amongst different religions and cultures.

=== 2019 ===
The 2019 recipients of the Gibraltar Medallion of Honour were:

- Karel Mark Chichon – for excelling outside Gibraltar in his field of music as a conductor.
- Elisa Sheriff- (posthumous) – for campaigning in London in the 1960s and standing for election to the House of Commons against then Foreign Secretary Michael Stewart to promote Gibraltar's cause.
- Karen Prescott – for becoming the first Gibraltarian woman Judge.
- Louis Triay QC – for services to Politics, the Law and Sailing.

The 2019 recipients of the Gibraltar Medallion of Distinction were:

==== For services to education ====
- Robert Albert Beiso (posthumous)
- Maria Teresa Beiso
- Julie Canepa
- Janet Davidson
- Stewart Harrison (Cybersecurity work)
- Joseph Cortes
- Jyoti Massetti
- Patricia Duarte
- Charles Pizarro

==== For services to promoting Europe and education ====
- Albert Danino
- Ivan Navas

==== For promoting Gibraltar abroad ====
- Joseph Carseni (United States of America)
- David Liston (United States of America)
- Mohamed Lehyan (Morocco)

==== For charitable work ====
- Emily Adamberry (Clubhouse)
- Marielou Guerrero (Gib Sams)
- Kishin Alwani (Alwani Charitable Trust)
- Charles Azzopardi (Several Charitable Projects)
- Rosanna Olivares (Multiple Charitable Projects)
- Mercy Posso (Cancer Charities)
- Myra Zayas (Cancer Charities)
- Annie Green (Childine Gibraltar)
- Daphne Alcantara (Work with Alzheimer and Dementia Patients and Families)
- Alfred Medina (Ivanhoe Society and Charitable Causes)
- Julio Pons (Multiple Associations and Societies)
- Joseph Chiara (St John Ambulance)

==== For services to health ====
- Susan Vallejo
- Anthony Kevan Sercombe
- Adolfo Donald Bacarese-Hamilton

==== For services to our environment and quality of life ====
- Keith Bensusan (GONHS)
- Janet Howitt (ESG)

==== For services to culture ====
- Jordan Bautista (Polish National Ballet)
- Joseph "Pepe" Roman (Author of the lyrics of 'Llévame Donde Nací')
- Freddie Ryman (Postage Stamp Designer)
- John Grech (Catering Services to the City Hall)
- Nathan Payas (Opera)
- Gibraltar Re-enactment Society
- Tito Vallejo (Promoting the History of Gibraltar)
- John Bugeja (Photography)
- Lati Edmonds (Former Commissioner of Girlguiding Gibraltar)
- Valerie Feetham-Makey (Former Commissioner of Girlguiding Gibraltar)
- Alfred Reoch (Scouts)

==== For services to tourism ====
- William Piccone (Bristol Hotel)
- Stephen Vella (Kestrel Aviation Management)

==== For public service ====
- Joseph Caruana (Public Service and Drugs Rehabilitation)
- Jack Noble (Chairman Royal Engineers Association Gibraltar Branch)
- Hazel Cumbo (CEO Courts Service, presided over changeover)
- Hector Cohen (TGWU/AACR/Lions/Diabetic Association/Cavalcade Committee)
- Dennis Reyes (posthumous – former Clerk of the House of Assembly)
- Aida Goldwin (Holy Trinity Diocese of Gibraltar in Europe/Local Community)
- Gilbert Joseph Podesta (Heritage)
- Paul Baglietto (Royal Gibraltar Regiment)
- Clive Finlayson (Work on Gorham's Cave)
- Geraldine Finlayson (Work on Gorham's Cave)
- Mario Hook (Office of the Ombudsman)
- Michael Gil (Former Chief Technical Officer and Public Services Commission)
- Hector Montado (Chief Technical Officer)
- John Collado (Former Managing Director Land Property Services Ltd)
- Peter Montegriffo (Politics, Law, Financial Services, Gaming, University of Gibraltar and Gibraltar International Bank)
- Jose Julio Pisharello (Financial Services, Gaming, University of Gibraltar and Gibraltar International Bank)
- Peter Isola (Law, Financial Services, Gaming, University of Gibraltar and Gibraltar International Bank)
- Albert Langston (Gibraltar International Bank)
- Victor Ochello (Trade Union Movement)
- Haresh Budhrani (Speaker and President of the Hindu Community)
- Ali Douissi (Moroccan Community Association)
- Clive Golt (Broadcast Journalism and International Relations)
- James Dalmedo (Services to successive Chief Ministers)
- Christine Clifton-Psaila (Broadcast Journalism)
- Susan Clifton-Tucker (Broadcasting)
- Manuel Ruiz (Senior Citizens)
- Terence Lopez (Aviation Industry)
- Joseph Acris (Aviation Industry)
- Alice Mascarenhas (Broadcast and Written Journalism)
- Francis Sheriff (Government and Other Work)

==== For services to sport ====
- Anthony Joaquin (Martial Arts)
- Peter Conroy (Martial Arts)
- Frank Carreras (Athletics)
- Linda Alvarez (Island Games)
- Lee Casciaro (Football)

=== 2021 ===
The 2021 recipients of the Gibraltar Medallion of Honour were:

- Sohail Bhatti – for public health services during the COVID-19 pandemic
- Kenelm Creighton KBE CVO (posthumous) – for protecting Gibraltarians during their World War II evacuation.

== The Roll of Honour ==
A roll of Medallion recipients is kept: the Roll of Honour. Every year the historical roll is published. Besides the recipients of the Medallion, all recipients of the Freedom of the City are automatically entered into the roll. They are the following:

- Gustavo Bacarisas (painter)
- James Joseph Giraldi (doctor)
- Sir Joshua Abraham Hassan (former Mayor and Chief Minister)
- Sir Robert Peliza (former Chief Minister)
- The Rt Revd Monsignor Patrick Devlin (former Roman Catholic Bishop)
- The Baron Merrivale
- The Lord Bethel
- The Lord Hoyle JP
