= Gaxiola =

Gaxiola is a Mexican surname with Spanish-French-Italian origins that may refer to:

- Álvaro Gaxiola (1937–2003), Mexican Olympic diver
- Daniel Amador Gaxiola (born 1956), Mexican politician
- Emma Larios Gaxiola (born 1954), Mexican politician
- Francisco Javier Gaxiola (1870–1933), Mexican lawyer, politician and diplomat
- Hilda Gaxiola (born 1972), Mexican beach volleyball player
- Jamillette Gaxiola (born 1989), beauty pageant contestant from Mexico
- José Francisco Madero Gaxiola (died 1833), Mexican surveyor and land commissioner
- Luz Gaxiola (born 1992), Mexican track cyclist
- Yuridia Francisca Gaxiola (born 1986), Mexican singer
