= Royal Calpe Hunt =

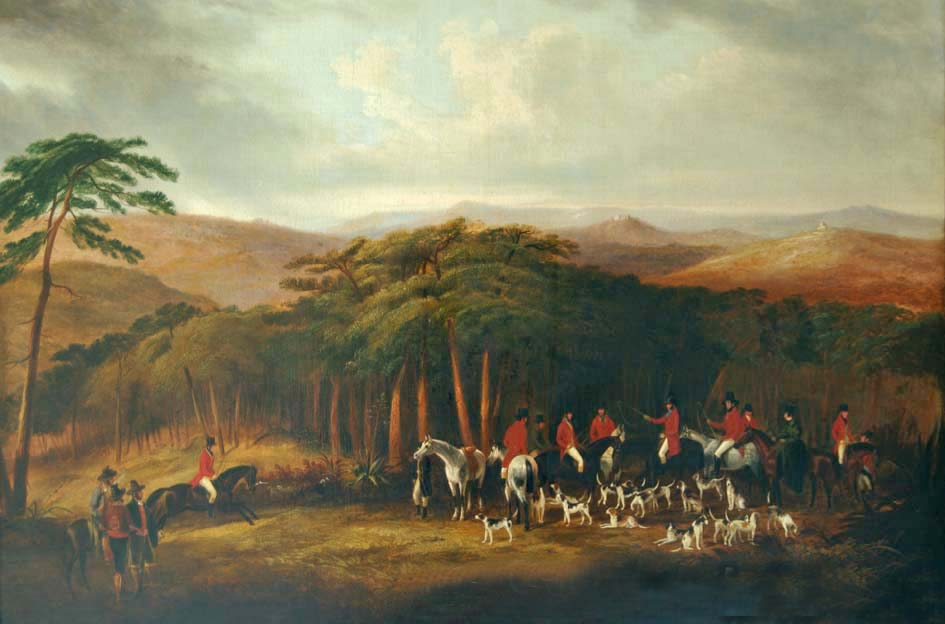
- Meet of the Calpe Hunt in the Cork Woods, George Cole; Prince George, Duke of Cambridge (left) and the Calpe Hunt
- Purpose: Fox hunt; initially civilian, then military
- Inaugurated: 1812
- Most recent: 1939
- Master of the Hunt: Charles Elphinstone Fleeming (first)
- Headquarters: Gibraltar

The Royal Calpe Hunt of the British Crown Colony of Gibraltar originated in 1812 as the Civil Hunt. The fox hunt was initially a civilian endeavour that began when a pair of English foxhounds were imported to Gibraltar. The hunts took place across the border, in the Campo de Gibraltar area of Spain. However, in 1814, the membership of the Hunt underwent a substantial change. Many officers of the Gibraltar garrison joined the Hunt, which shifted from a civilian to a military enterprise. That year, the name was changed to the Civil Calpe Hunt. It retained that title until 1817, after which it was known as the Calpe Hunt. The first Master of the Hunt was Charles Elphinstone Fleeming. However, the Master most associated with the Hunt was Pablo Larios, Marquis of Marzales, who held that title for forty-five years. His election to that position in 1891 was not only historic, but strategic. His appointment represented only the second time that the position had not been filled by a member of the military. In addition, his Spanish heritage and influence in the Campo de Gibraltar, where he owned extensive estates, garnered him the loyalty of the local Spanish farmers, and therefore eased the ever-present tensions between the military and the farmers over the crop damage that was inherent to the Hunt. In 1906, King Edward VII of the United Kingdom and King Alfonso XIII of Spain became joint Patrons of the Hunt, after which it was known as the Royal Calpe Hunt. The tradition of the Hunt continued for more than a century, until 1939, and the onset of the Second World War

== History ==
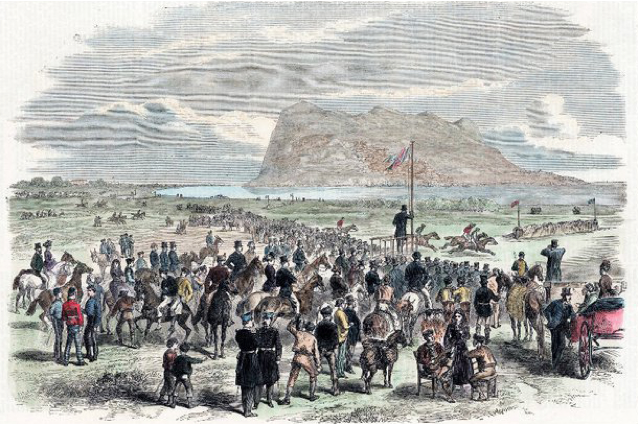
Calpe Hunt, 1870

Gibraltar, by then a British colony at the southern end of the Iberian Peninsula, generally had few opportunities for outdoor recreational activities at the turn of the nineteenth century. In 1812, the Reverend Mackareth, the garrison chaplain and former chaplain to the Duke of Kent, imported with a colleague a pair of English foxhounds. The hounds were Rookwood and Ranter and, after their arrival, other civilians obtained hunting dogs. The huntsmen who started the pack formed a club, the Civil Hunt, whose members wore blue uniforms with silver buttons. The hunting took place in Spain, in the Campo de Gibraltar area of Andalusia, with the furthest hunts about fourteen miles from Gibraltar. The hunts started in November, after the first rains, and ended in March when the ground became too dry. The hunts took place twice a week and many women participated.

By 1814, a substantial pack had been formed and was kennelled in San Roque, Cádiz, Spain. At the end of 1814, the hunt was limited by the quarantine that was placed on Gibraltar due to the reappearance of a yellow fever epidemic. The hunts continued, as the hounds were kennelled at San Roque. However, they were primarily attended by officers under the command of Admiral Fleming, their British Fleet moored off Algeciras. After the lifting of the quarantine, the character of the hunt changed. The fox hunt was at first all civilian; however, in 1814, many of the officers of the Gibraltar garrison became members, as well as officers of the San Roque and Algeciras Spanish garrisons. The majority of the civilian members left the club and many of the military joined. Management of the club was gradually transferred from civilians to the Gibraltar garrison officers. The name of the club was changed to the Civil Calpe Hunt in 1814, and the club retained that title until 1817, after which it was known as the Calpe Hunt.

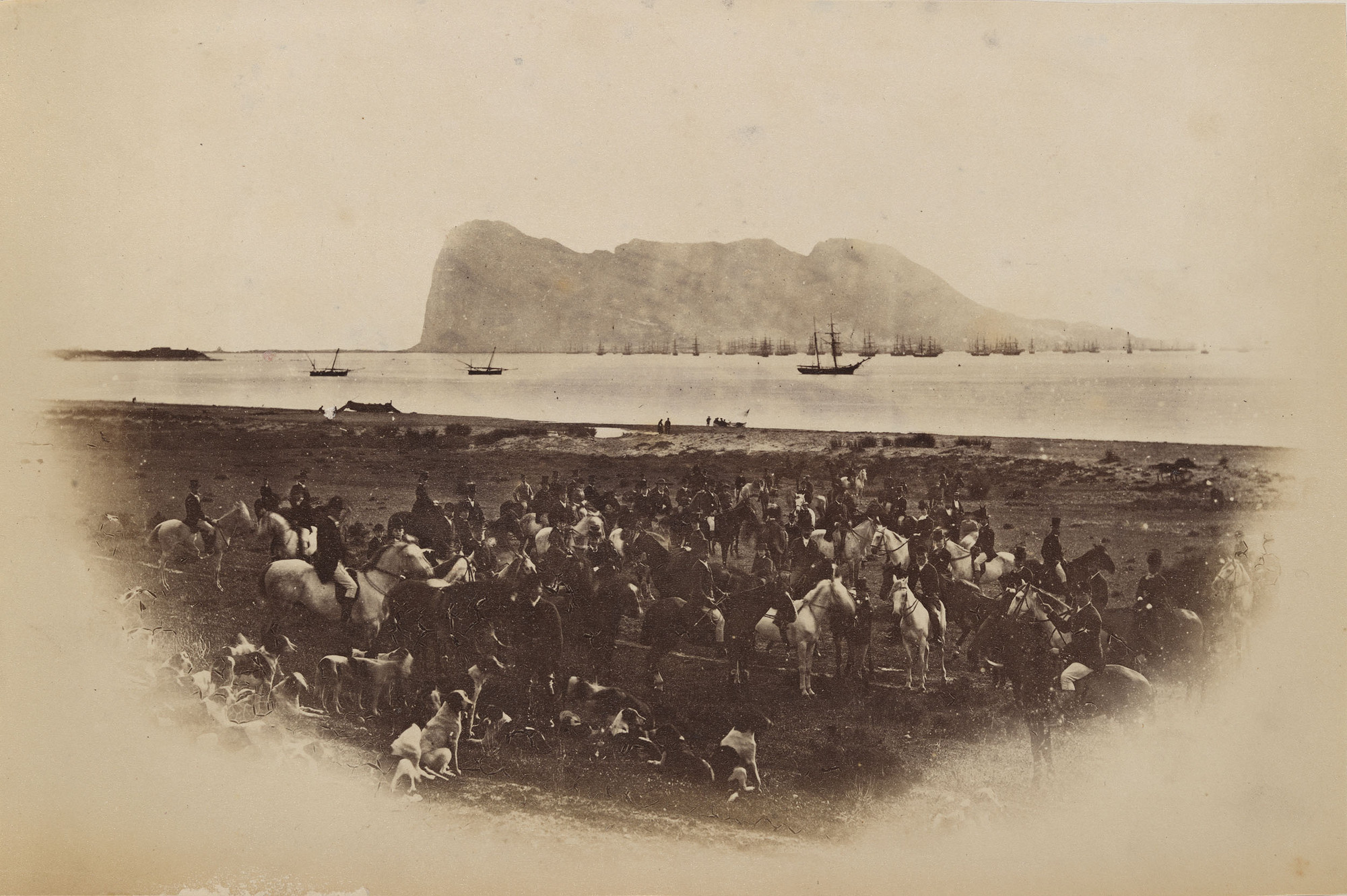
Meet of Calpe Hunt, 1879

The uniform of the club changed from blue to scarlet. The hounds were transferred from San Roque, and a kennel was built at the North Front with the support of the Governor of Gibraltar, Sir George Don. Many of the hounds were obtained from packs in England, as pups born in Gibraltar were found to be difficult to rear. The huntsmen rode Spanish horses. Later, new kennels were constructed at the North Front in 1884, with the foundation stone laid by the wife of then Governor, Sir John Miller Adye. The activities associated with the hunt, including picnics and balls, evolved to become important society events. Accessibility of land in Spain was always an issue, beyond permission to cross the border. Permission needed to be obtained from the various Spanish farmers on whose lands they conducted the Hunt. One of the strategies employed since the early history of the Hunt involved sending invitations to military officials in San Roque and Algeciras to attend the Hunt. The Hunt also paid the expenses related to crop damage, but payments remained a point of contention.

== Masters of the Hunt ==
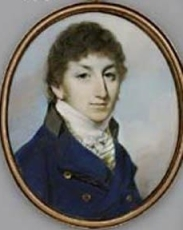
Charles Elphinstone Fleeming in 1789. He was the first Master of the Hunt.

The first Master of the Hunt was the Scotsman Charles Elphinstone Fleeming. Other Masters of the Hunt included Colonel Poulett Somerset, C.B. 7th Regiment of Foot (Royal Fusiliers), Colonel J. Kelly Holdsworth, and Colonel Morgan Crofton.

In the mid nineteenth century, meetings of the Royal Calpe Hunt were held at what is now known as Gibraltar City Hall in John Mackintosh Square. At that time, it was the Club House Hotel and had been leased to John Ansaldo. It was used by a variety of sporting clubs. In 1875, the building was sold to Pablo Antonio Larios (1819 – 1879), a wealthy businessman and banker, Gibraltarian-born but member of a Spanish family, who restored it.

After his death, his son Pablo Larios (1862 – 1938) inherited it. The younger Larios, Marqués de Marzales by marriage, became a member of the Calpe Hunt in 1884. His election as Master of the Hunt in 1891 was historic, as all previous Masters of the Calpe Hunt had been military, the only exception that of Judge Stewart Padget who served between 1848 and 1850. It was also strategic, as it eased the difficulties of land access and also reduced the perception of the Hunt as a military undertaking. It was also to the financial benefit of the Hunt, as Larios was only partially reimbursed for the expenses he incurred in purchasing the best dogs and maintaining the kennels. He was the Master of the Royal Calpe Hunt for 45 years, from 1891 to 1932 and from 1934 to 1938. One of the main landowners in the Campo de Gibraltar area, he built a sumptuous mansion in Gualdacorte, hosting also the kennels of the Royal Calpe Hunt. Larios lived in Connaught House until 1922, after which he settled in Algeciras.

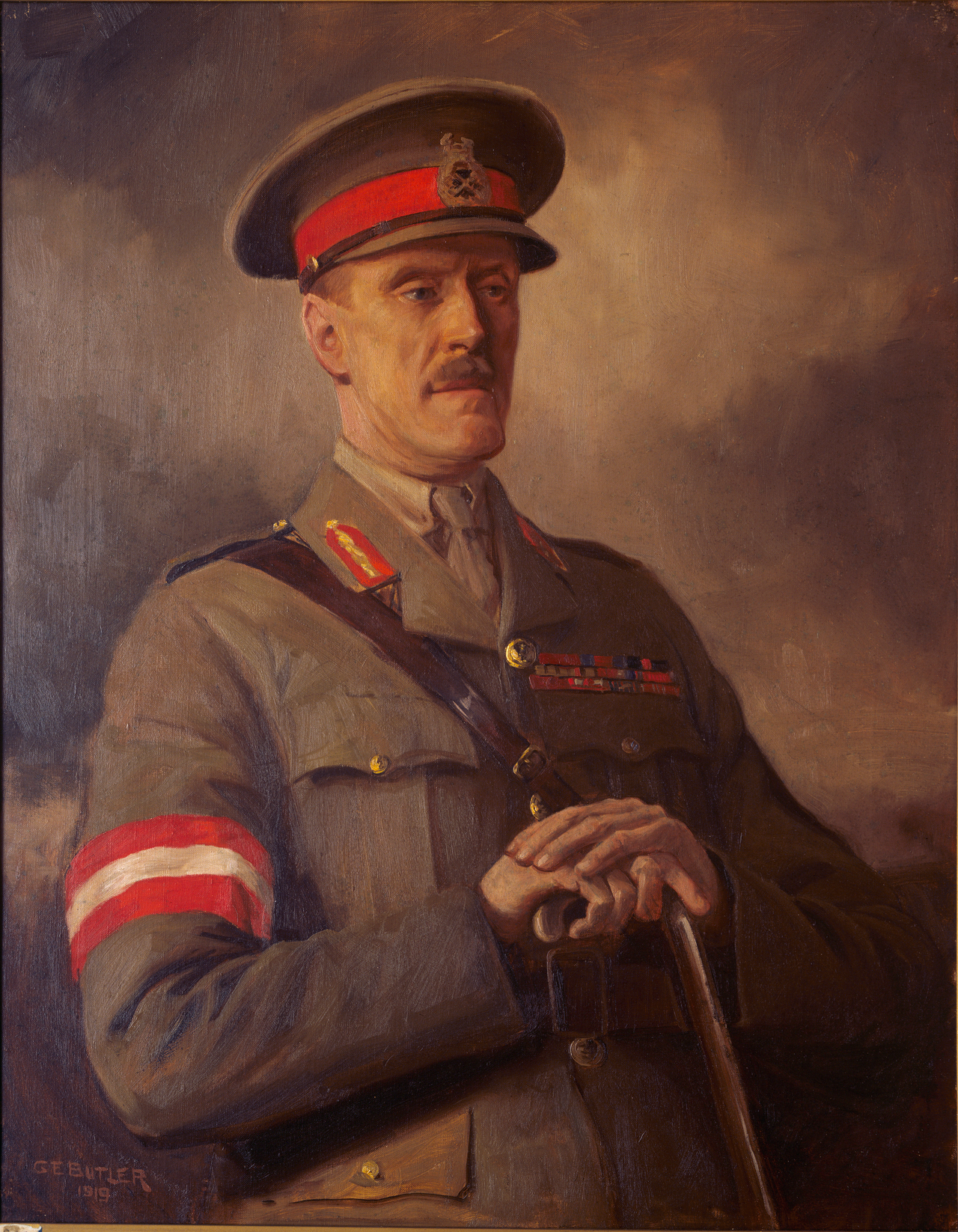
General Sir Alexander Godley

After General Sir Alexander Godley assumed the governorship in 1928, he was determined that Larios would no longer lead the Hunt. For Godley, a civilian, particularly a Spaniard, could not be the Master of the Royal Calpe Hunt. He also advocated for a younger Master. Larios was eventually forced to resign on 20 July 1932:

As far as the technical side of hunting hounds is concerned I am frankly of the opinion that the natural advantages which I possess over any young British officer, by reason of my knowledge of fox-hunting, my experience of this country, and nationality, outweigh whatever disadvantages may be alleged to have accrued from my advancing years. Whereas the Committee are led to suppose that a British community could, if necessary, hunt a pack of hounds in this country, on its own, I am convinced that they have been sadly misinformed on that point, and that any attempt to undertake it would invariably sound the death-knell on hunting in Andalusia forever.

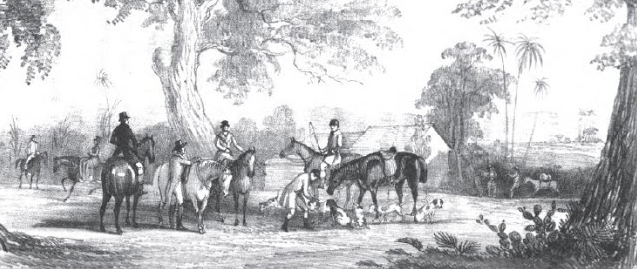
Calpe Hunt, 1838

The Committee of the Royal Calpe Hunt established a subcommittee on 23 August 1932 that was charged with ensuring that the land used for the Hunt remained accessible. The wealthy landowner and "gatekeeper" Larios was able to put most of the land for the hunt out of bounds. While the Hunt still had permission to cross the border into Spain, the loyalty of the Spanish farmers to Larios was such that most of them did not allow access to their land. An attempt was made to resume the Hunt the following season, but the paucity of available land made it very difficult. This caused tension in Gibraltar society between civilians and the military. Word reached the aristocrats in Britain, particularly after The Field, a magazine devoted to hunting, published an article detailing the reasons for the resignation of Larios. Supporters of the Governor became the "Godlies" while their opponents were known as "Ungodlies".

The next governor, Sir Charles Harington began his term in 1933 with instructions from King George V to resolve the discord surrounding the Hunt. Order was not restored until 1934, after Harington addressed the dilemma by naming his wife Lady Harington and Larios as joint Masters of the Royal Calpe Hunt. The farmers' fields were again made available to the Hunt. Larios continued as a joint Master until his death in Algeciras in 1938. He was interred in the family vault at North Front Cemetery. After the death of Pablo Larios, the Committee of the Royal Calpe Hunt appointed his son Pepito Larios, who at the time was a fighter pilot for the Nationalist side in the Spanish Civil War, and Governor of Gibraltar General Sir Edmund Ironside as joint Masters of the Hunt.

== Royal Patrons of the Hunt ==
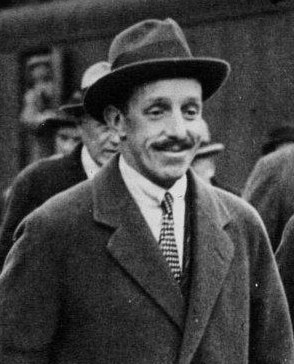
King Alfonso XIII

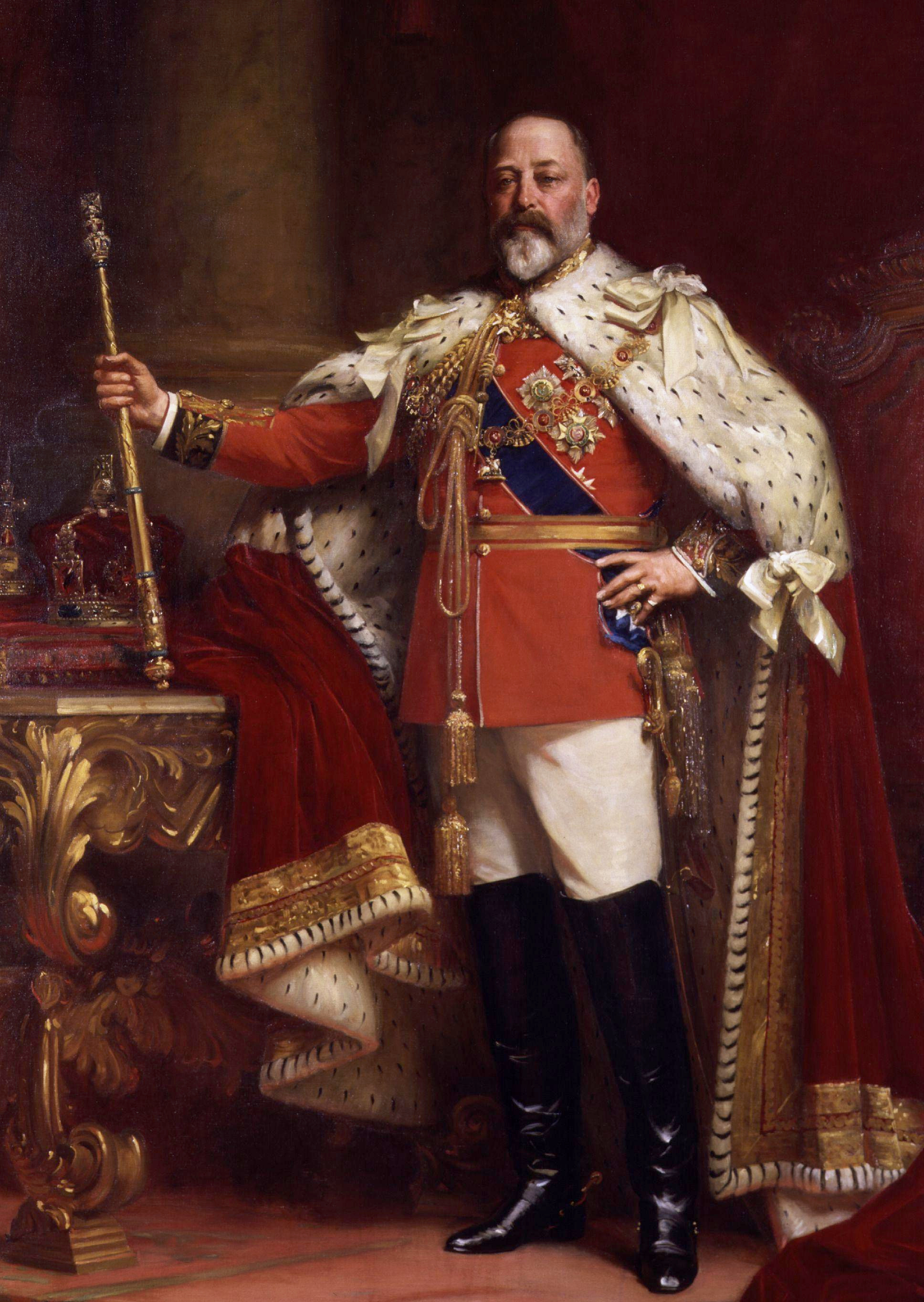
King Edward VII

Edward VII joined the Calpe Hunt in 1859 when he was still the Prince of Wales. Pablo's father was presented to the prince that year. In 1875, he made his house in Commercial Square available to the Duke of Connaught, the brother of the prince. The duke resided there for a year, and the residence became known as Connaught House. A close friendship developed between the Larios family and Edward VII. In 1906, Alfonso XIII of Spain married Princess Ena of England, the granddaughter of Queen Victoria, and the niece of Edward VII. Given the alliances that were forged between England and Spain, the Governor of Gibraltar sent a request to Edward VII asking him to consider a joint sponsorship of the Hunt with Alfonso XIII. Pablo Larios broke protocol: given the friendship that he had with both kings, he obtained the sponsorship of Alfonso XIII without the Calpe going through the process of formal application. The two kings became joint patrons of the Calpe Hunt in 1906, at which time it changed its name to the Royal Calpe Hunt. Larios indicated:

In 1906, I was instrumental in obtaining the honor of the Royal Patronage of Their Majesties King Edward the Seventh and King Alfonso the Thirteenth, which was a source of great satisfaction to me.

King George V also served as a joint Patron of the Royal Calpe Hunt.

== Legacy ==
In 1937, during the Spanish Civil War, the Governor of Gibraltar was successful in obtaining permission from Franco to continue the Hunt. The tradition of the Royal Calpe Hunt continued for more than a century. The last Hunt took place on 4 April 1939. It could not be resumed the following autumn due to the outbreak of the Second World War. Although the horses and the pack were maintained in the hope that the Hunt would resume, and the Hunt Committee remained active until 1973, the Second World War brought the end of the Royal Calpe Hunt.

On 30 May 2012, at the Garrison Library, Steven Linares, the Minister of Culture for Gibraltar, opened an exhibition featuring the Hunt. The library event was held in conjunction with other Diamond Jubilee and Spring Festival events as part of the 2012 schedule. There had been concerns that the exhibit would provoke the demonstrations of animal rights activists who had staged protests at the Instituto Cervantes the previous month due to lectures that had been held on the topic of bullfighting. However, the demonstrations were not repeated.

== Bibliography ==
- Jackson, William (1990). The Rock of the Gibraltarians. A History of Gibraltar (Second ed.). Grendon, Northamptonshire, United Kingdom: Gibraltar Books. ISBN 0-948466-14-6.
