= Elsa Jernås =

Swedish graphic artist, painter, and costume designer (1895–1979)

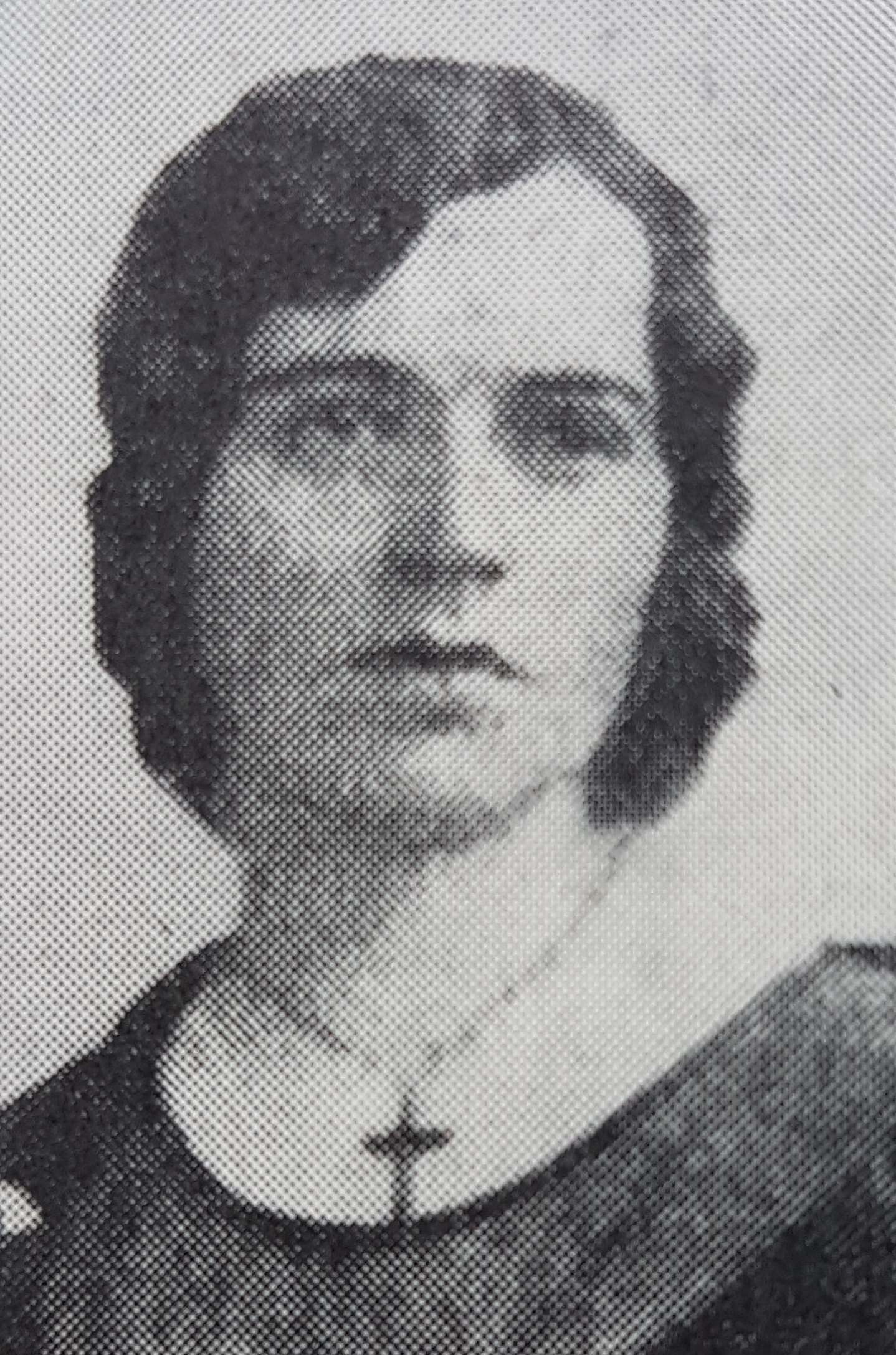
- Born: 10 September 1895; Masthuggs församling, Gothenburg, Sweden
- Died: December 1979 (aged 84); Seville, Spain
- Spouse: Gustavo Bacarisas

Elsa Oskaria Jernås Bacarisas (10 September 1895 – December 1979) was a Swedish graphic artist, painter and costume designer born in Masthuggs Parish, Gothenburg. She was married to Gibraltarian painter Gustavo Bacarisa.

She was born in Gothenburg on 10 September 1895 to Gustaf Oskar Jernås (then Johansson) and Ida Dahlström. Jernås studied art at Gothenburg's School of Design and Crafts and after her studies was active as a costume designer at various theaters in Gothenburg and Stockholm, including at the Royal Swedish Opera, where she met her future husband in connection with the 1922 staging of Carmen.

After their marriage, the couple moved to Spain, settling in Madrid in 1933. In 1936, as a result of the Spanish Civil War they moved to Gibraltar. During World War II, they spent several years in Funchal, Madeira (1940–1945), finally settling in Seville in 1947. With reference to her work there, the Andalucian specialist Jose de las Cuevas was quoted by Jose Riquelme Sanchez in the magazine Almoraima as having commented: "Elsa... dibujaba burillos deliciosas" (Elsa drew wonderful engravings).

Jernås held a solo exhibition of about fifty works in Barcelona in 1926. Her art consists of landscapes from Sweden and Spain depicted in charcoal drawings, oils, watercolors and lithographs.
