= Gibraltar House =

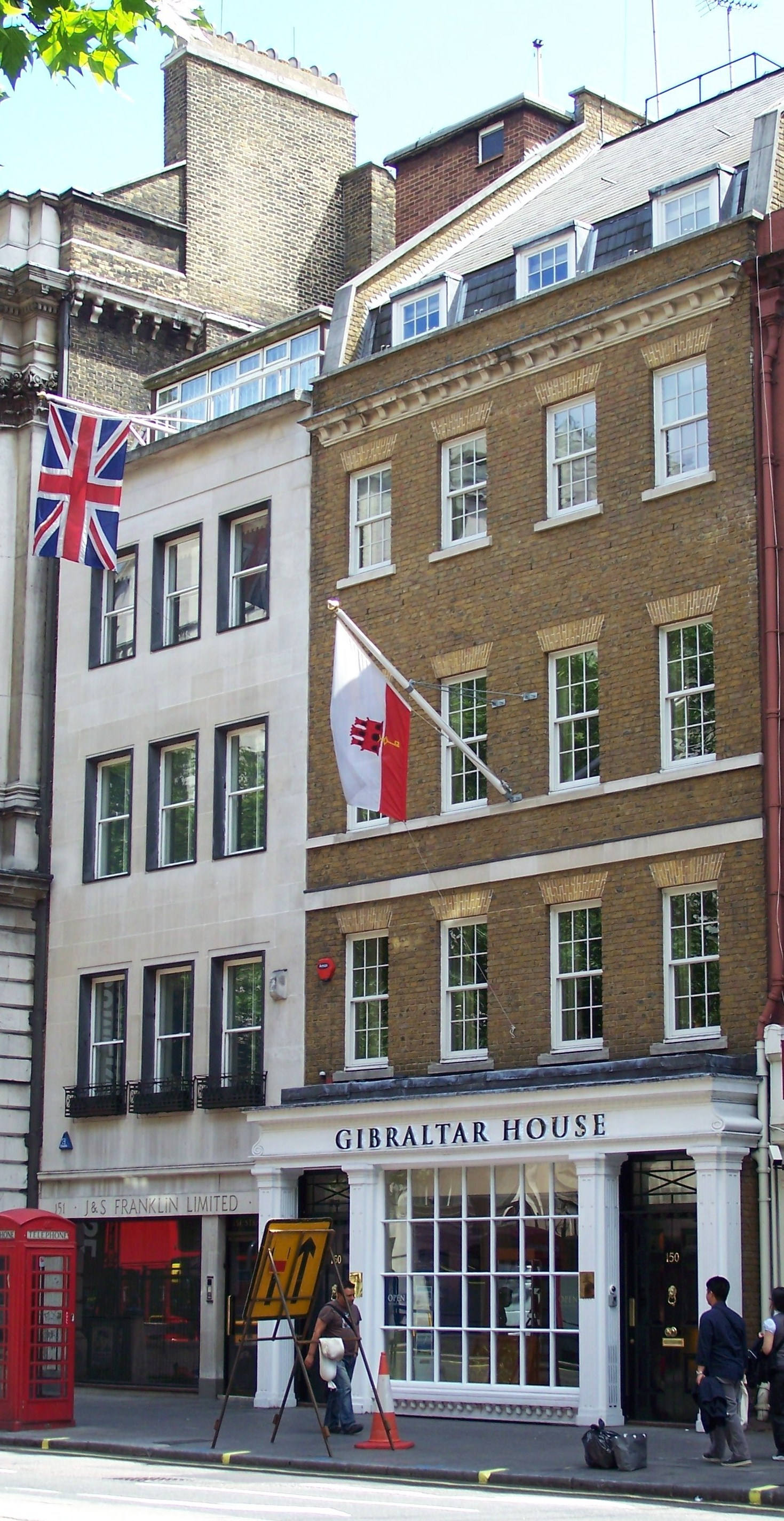
- Gibraltar House flying the Gibraltar Flag (2009).
- Location: Aldwych, London
- Address: 150 Strand, London, WC2R 1JA
- Coordinates: 51°30′41.846″N 0°7′4.737″W

The Representative of Gibraltar in Aldwych, London is the diplomatic mission of the British Overseas Territory of Gibraltar in the United Kingdom, also referred to as Gibraltar House. Located on the Strand, it functions as an informal consulate, tourist information centre about Gibraltar and assists Gibraltarian patients sent by the Gibraltar Health Authority for medical treatment in the United Kingdom.

== History ==
The first Gibraltar House, a small tourist information office, was opened in Northumberland Avenue, London, in the early 1970s. The first Director was Helen Gordon. A subsequent Gibraltar Tourist Office was opened in Trafalgar Square, under the command of John Joe Gomez. Soon after, it opened a much larger office at 179 Strand, directed by Jose Rosado and later by Richard Garcia. In 1989, Albert Poggio took over as Director, a position which he has held to this date (he was briefly replaced by Peter Canessa between 2011 and 2012). In 2009, the Gibraltar House moved to its current location at 150 Strand.

Although Albert Poggio had not become Director of the House until 1989, he had been suggesting the creation of a "social centre" in London since 1969, due to the work that he developed as Chairman of the Gibraltar Group, which congregated Gibraltarian expatriates in London.
