= Larios =

Larios is a surname with origins in Spain. Notable people with the surname include:

- Angélica Larios (born 1981), Mexican sabre fencer
- Bobby Larios, Mexican actor
- Carlos de Larios, American sound engineer
- César Larios (born 1988), Salvadoran footballer
- Chris Larios of Channel Awesome, an American online media production company based in Lombard, Illinois
- Dora De Larios (1933–2018), American ceramist and sculptor working in Los Angeles
- Emma Larios Gaxiola (born 1954), Mexican politician affiliated with the PAN, Senator of the LXI Legislature of the Mexican Congress
- Francisco García Larios, the Governor of Texas between 1744 and 1748
- Graciela Larios Rivas (born 1950), Mexican politician affiliated with the Institutional Revolutionary Party
- Héctor Larios Córdova (born 1954), Mexican politician affiliated with the PAN, Senator of the LXII Legislature of the Mexican Congress
- Jean-François Larios (born 1956), retired football midfielder from France
- José María Larios (died 1829), Mexican insurgent who served as a captain under José María Morelos y Pavón
- Lilia Fernandez Larios (1926–2011), Mexican television and film actress, active during the Golden Age of Mexican cinema
- Óscar Larios (born 1976), professional boxer from Mexico and former WBC Super Bantamweight and Featherweight champion
- Pablo Larios (1960–2019), football goalkeeper from Mexico

== See also ==
- Ríos
- Estádio de Los Larios, football stadium located in Xerém, a district of Duque de Caxias, Rio de Janeiro, Brazil
- Manny Pacquiao vs. Óscar Larios, a professional boxing super featherweight fight held in 2006 in the Philippines
- Arios (disambiguation)
- Lari (disambiguation)
