= Aaron Cardozo =

English businessman

Aaron Cardozo GMH
- Born: Aaron Nunez Cardozo; 1762
- Died: 1834 (aged 71–72)
- Occupations: Businessman; Consul
- Awards: Legion of Honour; Gibraltar Medallion of Honour

Aaron Nunez Cardozo, GMH (1762–1834) was an English businessman who was consul for Tunis and Algiers in Gibraltar around 1805.

== Career ==
Cardozo promoted the interests of the British Government and as delegate of Henry Edward Fox, the governor of Gibraltar, concluded a treaty on 5 November 1805 with Sidi Mahomet of Oran for provisioning the garrison of Gibraltar and the British squadron in the Mediterranean. He proceeded to Oran on board the frigate Termagant, which was placed at his disposal by Lord Nelson. Cardozo was successful in saving the lives of three Royal Navy sailors who were imprisoned at Oran and sentenced to death. He negotiated a treaty between the government of Portugal and the bey of Tunis.

Cardozo served as President of Gibraltar's Jewish community from 1791-1804.

In 1824, Cardozo was created a knight of the Legion of Honour by Louis XVIII of France and was rewarded with other orders of merit for his distinguished services.

== Mansion ==
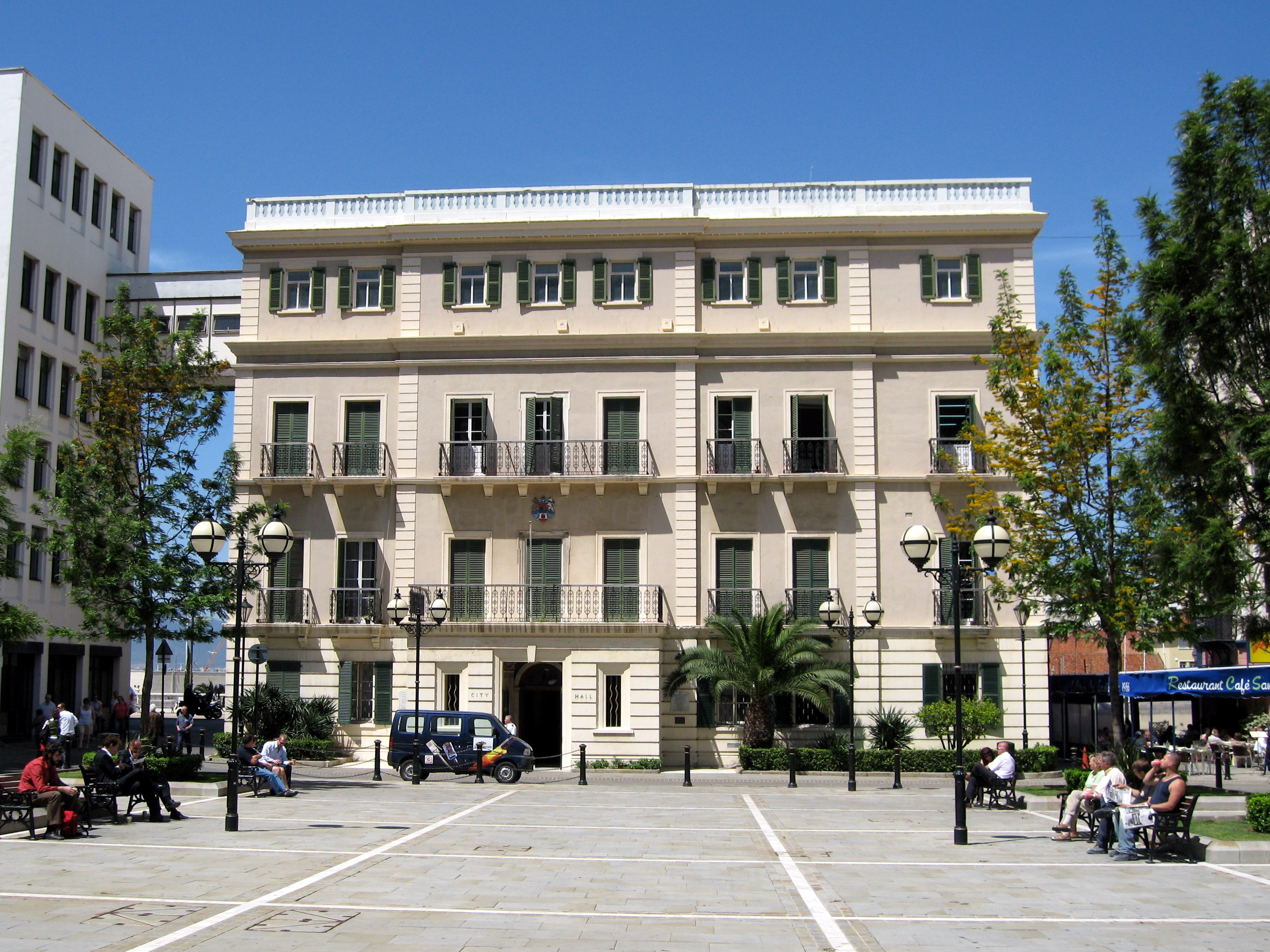
Main façade of the Gibraltar City Hall (formerly Cardozo's mansion), from John Mackintosh Square.

After settling in Gibraltar, Cardozo had a mansion built at John Mackintosh Square as his family home. The three-storey building was completed in 1819 and dominated John Mackintosh Square. It was erected on the site of the old hospital and chapel of La Santa Misericordia (The Holy Mercy) and later prison. As a non-Protestant, Cardozo was not legally allowed to own property in Gibraltar at the time. However, as he had been a close friend of Nelson and had supplied his fleet, he was eventually granted a site to build a house in the Alameda on the condition that it be "an ornament" to the square. Its cost was about £40,000.

Cardozo's mansion has become the Gibraltar City Hall and houses the Mayor's Parlour.
