= Llévame Donde Nací =

Song
- Language: Spanish
- Released: 1930s USA
- Genre: Traditional music
- Songwriter(s): Pepe Roman
- Composer(s): Pepe Roman

Llévame Donde Nací (English: Take Me Back To Where I Was Born) is the title of a traditional Spanish language patriotic song about Gibraltar attributed to Gibraltarian, guitarist and composer Pepe Roman.

== History ==
The song was written in the early 1930s after many Gibraltarians emigrated to the United States of America in search of job opportunities, but were instead faced with the hardships of the Great Depression. The song reflects the disillusion, anxiety and homesickness of these emigrants.

During the Second World War, this song became an anthem for those civilians who were evacuated from The Rock.

The song's popularity was maintained thereafter as Spanish sovereignty claims over Gibraltar during the 1960s leading to the eventual closure of the land frontier, resulting in complete isolation from the hinterland, gave rise to an increase in patriotic fervour.

== Current use ==
Llévame Donde Nací is now one of many patriotic songs sung by crowds at big public events such as political demonstrations and cultural events. The most notable being the Gibraltar National Day when it is sung by a school choir outside the City Hall every 10 September before the Mayor reads the National Day Declaration.

It is also the tune played by the chimes of the clock situated atop Watergate House at Grand Casemates Square on the hour.

== Lyrics ==
=== Spanish (original) ===
Llévame donde nací,
Que a tu lado quiero estar.
No hay un sitio para mí,
Como mi buen Gibraltar.

Sólo donde vi la luz,
Tengo puesta mi ilusión.
Llévame, quiero morir,
Junto a aquél, para mi gran Peñón.

La Línea y el Campamento,
Algeciras y mucho más,
Los domina por su altura,
El Peñón de Gibraltar.

Aunque América es muy grande,
Y tiene mucho que ver,
Yo quiero a mi Peñoncito,
Aquél que me dio a mí el ser.

=== English (translation) ===
Take me back to my birthplace
For I want to be by your side to be.
There's nowhere for me that compares
To my dear Gibraltar.

Nowhere but where I was born
Have I set all my hopes.
Take me there, I want to die
By the side of my great Rock.

La Línea and Campamento,
Algeciras and further beyond
Are towered over by the height
Of the Rock of Gibraltar.

Although America may be vast
And have a great deal to see,
I still love my little Rock
Which gave my life to me.^{[i]}

== See also ==
- Bardengesang auf Gibraltar: O Calpe! Dir donnert's am Fuße
- Gibraltar Anthem

== Notes ==
i This is a translation of the original Spanish for use in Wikipedia, for the sole purpose of helping the non-Spanish speaker understand the content of the lyrics. It is in no way an official translation.
