= Mario Arroyo =

Gibraltarian poet

Mario Arroyo is a Gibraltarian poet and former school teacher. He is the author of Profiles (1994), a series of bilingual meditations on love, loneliness and death. In 2009 he was described by the Spanish newspaper El Pais as 'un perfecto bilingue'. A study commissioned by the prestigious Spanish cultural body el Instituto Cervantes in 2005 remarked that Arroyo's poetry possessed "indudable inspiración en la experiencia vivida y en la realidad local, aunque a diferencia de otros escritores gibraltareños no cae en reductores localismos, sino que es capaz de dar una significación trascendente a sus reflexiones personales." Arroyo is also a noted dancer. In September 2015, Arroyo was awarded the Gibraltar Medallion of Honour for his contribution to the arts.
