= Albert Poggio =

Gibraltarian businessman

Albert Poggio GMH, OBE
- Born: Albert Andrew Poggio; 1945 (age 80–81); Ballymena, Northern Ireland
- Education: City of London Polytechnic
- Occupation: political consultant
- Known for: Director of the Gibraltar House
- Spouse: Sally
- Children: Sarah Tracey Poggio

Albert Andrew Poggio GMH, OBE, (born 1945) is a Gibraltarian businessman and political consultant. Besides being Director of the Friends of Gibraltar Heritage Society and member of the United Kingdom Overseas Territories Association Committee, he was Director of Gibraltar Electrical Supplies, Director of the Gibraltar Tourist Board and managing director of the Gibraltar Information Bureau in London. Poggio married in the late 1960s Sally, an Israel-born solicitor; the couple had a daughter, Sarah Tracey Poggio, born in 1968.

== Biography ==
Born in a Gibraltarian evacuee camp in Ballymena, Northern Ireland Albert Poggio became part of an entire generation of Gibraltarians who were born away from the Rock after their parents were evacuated from Gibraltar along with most of the civilian population during World War II. In 1947, he arrived in Gibraltar for the first time. He studied at the Gibraltar Hebrew School (where he was taught by Isaac Benyunes) and at the Gibraltar Grammar School of the Christian Brothers. He returned to the United Kingdom at age 11, to complete his education, and later studied electrical engineering at the City of London Polytechnic. During the period he spent away from Gibraltar, Poggio kept in touch with the Gibraltarian expatriates who later constituted the "Gibraltar Group". The group began meeting around 1965, and even though they had differences of opinion, the consensus was that they should work in Gibraltar's best interests, which was then threatened by the economic blockade imposed by the government of Spanish dictator General Franco. For this reason, one of Poggio's first initiatives as chairman of the Gibraltar Group, was the establishment of charter flights between the UK and Gibraltar. The flights were operated for many years by Monarch Airlines, and later by British Airtours.

In 1969, with the election of Sir Robert Peliza of the Integration with Britain Party as Chief Minister of Gibraltar, Poggio saw the opportunity to establish a representative office for the Government of Gibraltar in London: the Gibraltar House. The idea, however, had to be postponed, following Sir Joshua Hassan's victory at the 1972 general elections and in 1974 Poggio lost control of the Gibraltar Group to Michael Mifsud, only regaining chairmanship in 1977. This year, Poggio decided to discontinue the charter flights to Gibraltar, and concentrated his efforts on the creation of the Gibraltar House, which would be a "hostel", and little more than a social centre in London. The last election for the Gibraltar Group was held in 1980, and won by Poggio. Mifsud not accepting defeat, decided to form his own group, the Friends of Gibraltar. Subsequently, the other members of the Group of Gibraltar were encouraged to join the Friends of Gibraltar Heritage Society.

However, Poggio will perhaps be best remembered for the long time that he spent as Director of the Gibraltar House and Her Majesty's Government of Gibraltar's representative in the UK. Leading the office since 1989, he was replaced on 1 April 2011 by Peter Canessa, due to "differences of opinion" with the then Chief Minister, Peter Caruana. However, in late February 2012, Poggio announced that he was "back in full control" of the representative office in London, Canessa being solely responsible for the House's management. Notwithstanding, during the period away from direction, Poggio continued his role of lobbying the UK Parliament's, political parties and local authorities.

Due to his political contacts, Poggio had always gained "research assistant" passes that have allowed him free access to the UK House of Commons and its dependencies. In 2002, the pass was provided by Jimmy Hood, Labour.

In 2002, when the UK and Spain were debating the issue of the joint sovereignty over Gibraltar, Poggio led an aggressive public relations campaign to sensitise the House of Commons to veto any attempt to negotiate Gibraltar's fate with the Spanish government. The campaign was a success, bringing at least 123 out of the 659 MPs in the all-party support group to Gibraltar's cause.

The extent of the powers granted to Poggio despite not being an elected member of the government caused some discomfort – even in Gibraltar. In 2009, on a visit to Devon, Poggio was referred to in the local newspaper, the Herald Express, as "His Excellency" and "High Commissioner of Gibraltar." The Panorama noted that Poggio was never a "High Commissioner" and the title of "His Excellency" in Gibraltar is exclusively reserved for the Governor – a position superior to that of Chief Minister.

=== Awards ===
In March 2015, Poggio was awarded the Grassroot Diplomat Initiative Honouree for strengthening political and business ties for Gibraltarians and British citizens alike over the last 20 years.
