= Gibraltar Hebrew School =

Coordinates: 36.1393°N 5.3541°W

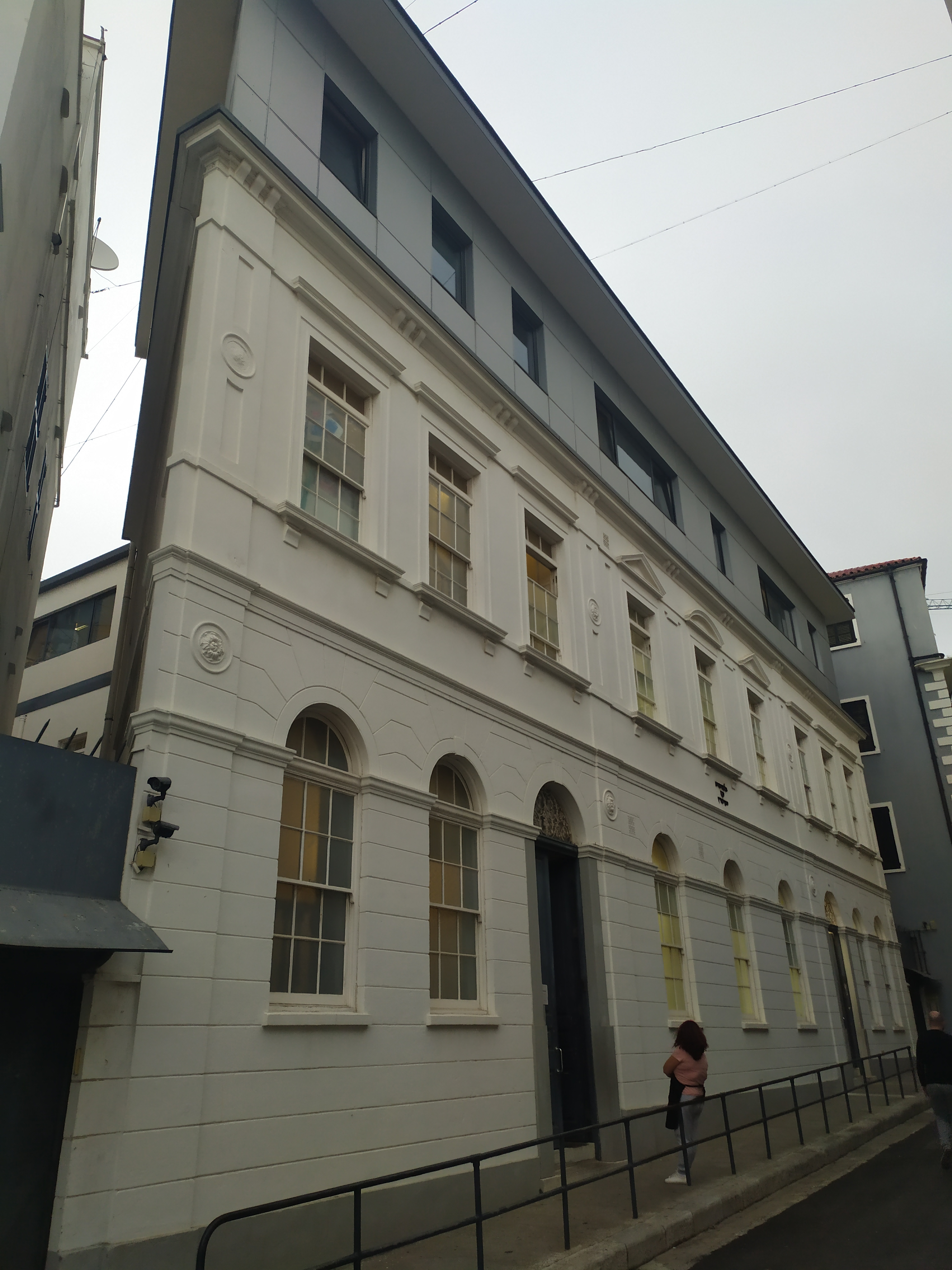
Gibraltar Hebrew School

Gibraltar Hebrew School, also Talmud Torah Hebrew School, is a government school in the British Overseas Territory of Gibraltar. The foundation stone of the school, designed by Samuel Levy, was laid on 3 September 1895 in a ceremony attended by the Rabbi of Gibraltar and the local Jewish community. It was inaugurated in 1898. A mixed school, as of 2013 it had about 150 pupils.

== Notable alumni ==
- Albert Poggio
