= John Mackintosh Square =

Square in Gibraltar

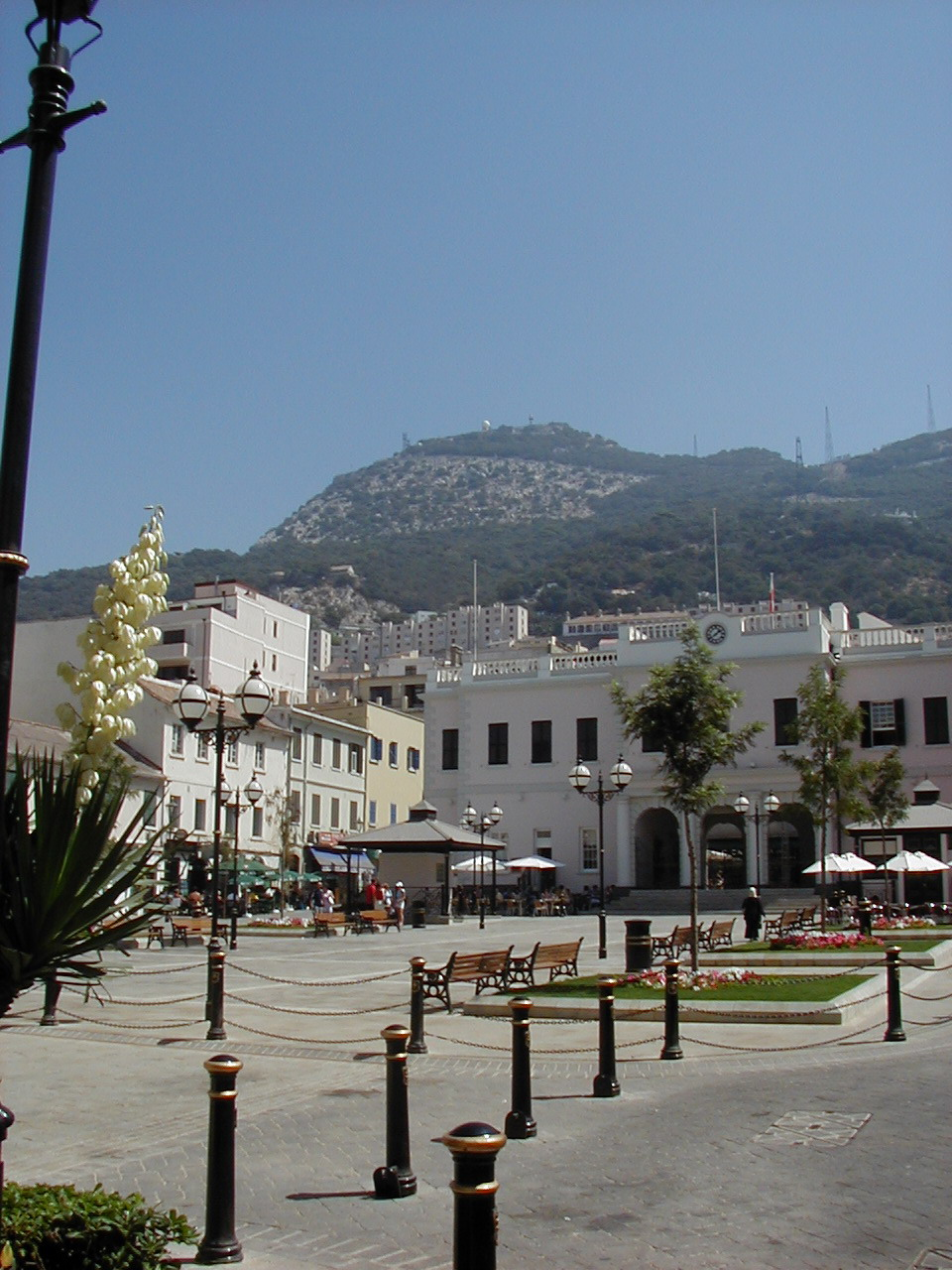
- View of John Mackintosh Square in 2005, with the Gibraltar Parliament at the East side of the square
- Interactive map of John Mackintosh Square
- Former names: Plaza Mayor, Alameda, The (Grand) Parade, Commercial Square, Plazuela del Martillo/El Martillo, the Piazza
- Owner: Government of Gibraltar
- Location: Gibraltar
- Coordinates: 36°8′27.015″N 5°21′15.01″W

John Mackintosh Square (colloquially The Piazza) is a main square in the British overseas territory of Gibraltar. It has been the centre of city life since the 14th century and takes its name from John Mackintosh, a local philanthropist. Notable buildings on John Mackintosh Square include the Parliament Building and the City Hall.

== History ==
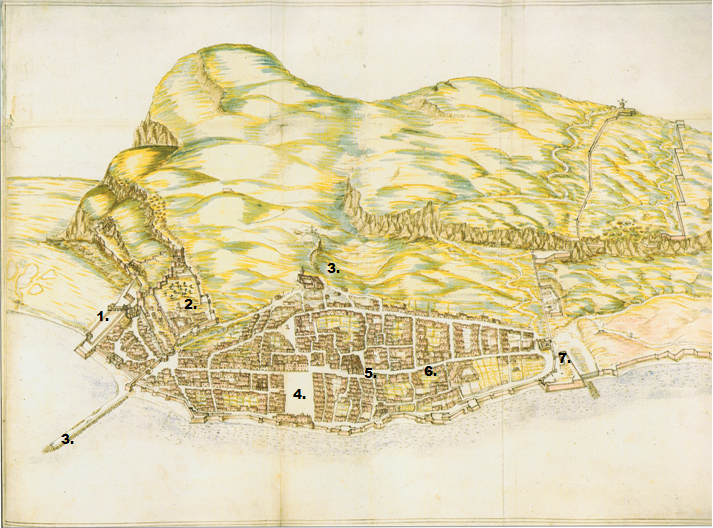
Map of Gibraltar in 1627, by Luis Bravo de Acuña: 1- Puerta de España (now Landport Gate) 2- Castillo (Moorish Castle) 3- Hospital de San Juan de Dios (the old St Bernard's Hospital) 4- Plaza Mayor (now John Mackintosh Square) 5- Iglesia parroquial de Santa María la Coronada y San Bernardo (now the Cathedral of St. Mary the Crowned) 6- Calle Real (now Main Street 7- Puerta de África (now Southport Gates) 8- Muelle Viejo (Old Mole)

Originally known during the Spanish period as Plaza Mayor (English: Main Square) (according to Alonso Hernández del Portillo in his work titled Historia de la Muy Noble y Más Leal Ciudad de Gibraltar −English: History of the Very Noble and Most Loyal City of Gibraltar) or Gran Plaza (English: Great Square) and afterwards as the Alameda (Spanish for an avenue lined with poplars, not to be confused with the Alameda Gardens), it opened out from the west of the Calle Real (now Main Street). Two buildings separated it from the Line Wall (Gibraltar's main sea wall during the Spanish period, which run from Landport to the foot of the South Mole): a large rectangular building to the west of the square, and a smaller lower building to the south of it, the hospital and chapel of La Santa Misericordia (English: The Holy Mercy).

During the first century of the British period, the square was used for military parades by the garrison and therefore known as the Parade or Grand Parade. In 1704, after the city's capture by an Anglo-Dutch fleet, the British converted the hospital and chapel of La Santa Misericordia into a debtors' prison. In 1753, a survey of Gibraltar went on showing a prison at the western end of the square. After the Great Siege, a colonnaded Georgian guardhouse was built on the southern side of the square. It was the Main Guard, the place from which all the sentries in Gibraltar were posted each evening. Some years later it hosted the Fire Brigade. After the move of the brigade to the new fire station at Victoria Battery in 1938, it became the Rates Office. Today the guardhouse houses the Gibraltar Heritage Trust.

The square was also where military punishment in the form of floggings took place.

The look of the square changed very much during the second decade of the 19th century, when its two most prominent buildings were constructed. In 1817 local merchants raised money by public subscription to construct a building to house the Exchange and Commercial Library. In 1807, Gibraltar merchants had founded a library in Bedlam Court, as they were denied membership of the Garrison Library, it being available only to members of the British garrison in the city (the Garrison Library functioned not only as a library, but as a club, owned and run by and for military officers; civilians were excluded, regardless of their prominence). Ten years later, in 1817, they built themselves a new building on the east side of the square, thus separating it from Main Street. It housed, not only a library, but also an auction room and became the meeting place of local merchants. In 1951, the building was refurbished to host the Legislative Council, which in 1969 become the House of Assembly. Since 2006, the building hosts the Gibraltar Parliament.

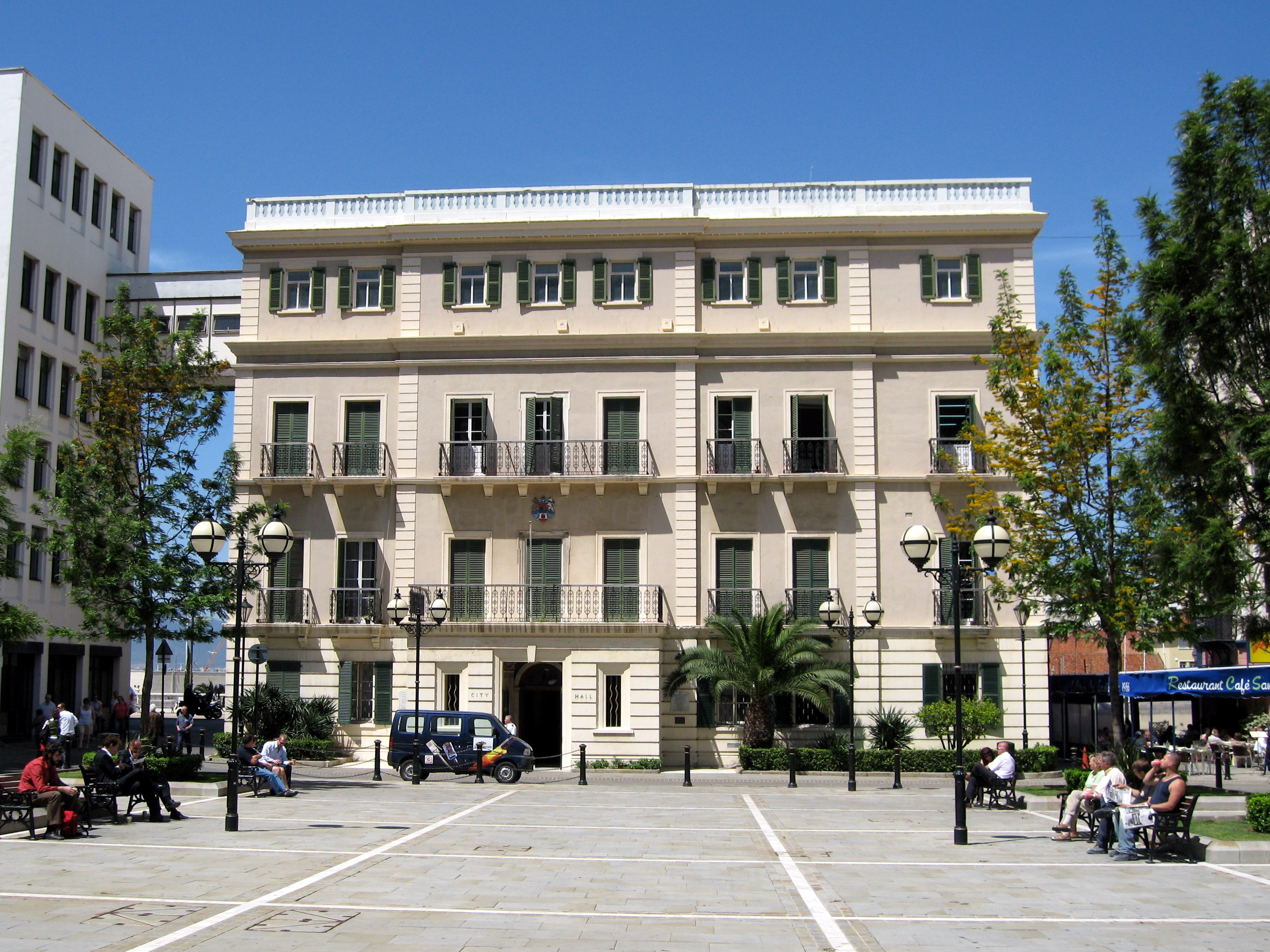
View of the City Hall from John Mackintosh Square

About the same time, in 1819, on the opposite side of the square, Aaron Cardozo, a prosperous merchant of Jewish Portuguese descent, built the grandest private mansion ever seen in Gibraltar. The three-storey house dominated the square. It was erected on the site of the old hospital and chapel of La Santa Misericordia and later prison. As a non Protestant, Cardozo was not legally allowed to own property in Gibraltar. However, as he had been a close friend of Horatio Nelson and had supplied his fleet, he was eventually granted a site to build a house in the Alameda on the condition that it be "an ornament" to the square. Its cost was about £40,000. After his death in 1834, his mansion was rented out as a hotel, the Club House Hotel. It was bought in 1874 by Pablo Antonio Larios, a wealthy businessman and banker, Gibraltarian-born and member of a Spanish family, who completely refurbished the building. In 1922, his son Pablo Larios, Marquis of Marzales, sold the building to the Gibraltar colonial authorities, which intended to turn it into a post office. However, it eventually became the premises of the newly formed Gibraltar City Hall which now houses the Mayor's Parlour. The building later underwent multiple modifications (such as the addition of a new storey and an extension to the north) that altered the original symmetry of the building.

In the mid 19th century the name of the square was changed to Commercial Square, being the site of a daily flea market and regular public auctions, as a result of which a Spanish name, Plazuela del Martillo, or more colloquially, El Martillo, was coined ("martillo" being the Spanish word for a gavel). Another popular name at the time was Jews Market. These epithets fell out of usage and the square is typically referred to as The Piazza, an Italian name created following the construction of a paved area in the centre of the square, probably introduced by Gibraltar's Genoese settlers. The name "John Mackintosh Square" was officially adopted in 1940.

=== Fountains ===
In 1571, an aqueduct was built to channel drinking water from the Red Sands in the south district to the city. A fountain at the northwest corner of the square (the steps now called Fountain Ramp, known in Spanish as Callejón de la Fuente, to the north of where the City Hall is today) was supplied by this aqueduct. Although the aqueduct fell into disuse some years later, with the fountain drying up, the fountain head was refurbished in 1694. It was moved to Castle Street in 1887 and remained there until the 1960s. It was eventually re-erected on the Line Wall against Zoca Flank some 20 metres (66 ft) to the northwest of its original location (four lion-headed vents were carved in the low part of the fountain, representing war, pestilence, death and peace).

In 1869, a new fountain was erected by the Sanitary Commission, fed from wells in the isthmus that links The Rock with Spain to supply drinking water. It was inaugurated on 8 December by Lady Airey, wife of Governor Sir Richard Airey. However, the "Airey Fountain" became dry very soon and was replaced in 1879 by an ornamental fountain constructed to commemorate the stay of The 1st Duke of Connaught and Strathearn — third son of Queen Victoria — in Gibraltar. It was dismantled during the Second World War.

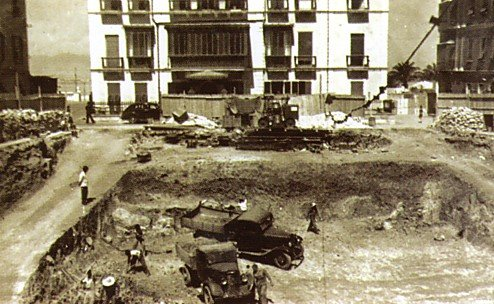
The construction of an air-raid shelter beneath John Mackintosh Square (then known as Commercial Square) in 1939 (looking west).

=== Air-raid shelter ===
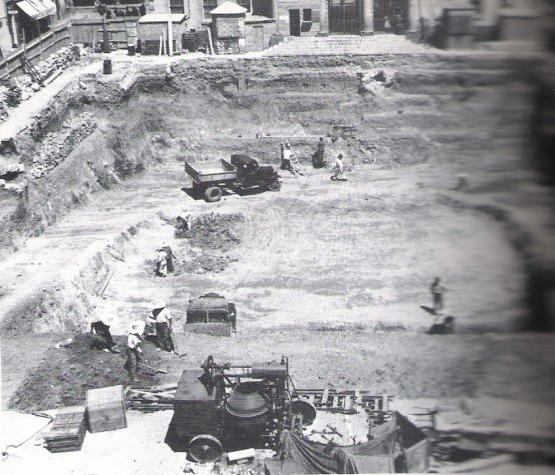
The construction of an air-raid shelter beneath John Mackintosh Square (then known as Commercial Square) in 1939 (looking east).

In 1939 excavations were carried out for the construction of an air-raid shelter under John Mackintosh Square. These excavations revealed no prior building foundations, suggesting the square has been an open plaza for its entire 600+ year history. Today, part of the underground shelter houses the square's public toilets.

== Events ==
=== Evacuation of the Gibraltarian civilian population during World War II ===
After the breakout of World War II a decision was made to enforce a mass evacuation from Gibraltar in order to increase the strength of The Rock as a fortress with increased military and naval personnel. This meant that only those civilians with essential jobs were allowed to stay.

In early June 1940, about 13,500 evacuees were shipped to Casablanca in French Morocco. However, following the capitulation of the French to the German armies in June 1940 and the destruction of the French fleet at Mers el-Kebir by the British fleet, the new Pro-German French Vichy Government asked for all Gibraltarians to be removed. An opportunity for their removal soon arose when 15 British cargo vessels arrived at Casablanca under Commodore Crichton, repatriating French servicemen rescued from Dunkirk. Once they had disembarked, the ships were interned until they agreed to take on all the evacuees. Although Crichton could not clean and restock his ships (and contrary to British Admiralty orders which forbade the taking on of evacuees), he eventually agreed to do so. However, when the evacuees arrived in Gibraltar, the Governor, Sir Clive Liddel, did not allow them to land, fearing that once the evacuees were back on The Rock, it would be virtually impossible to re-evacuate them. Crowds gathered at John Mackintosh Square as the news of the orders not to land broke, speeches were made and two City Councilors accompanied by the Acting President of the Exchange and Commercial Library went to see the Governor Liddell to ask that the evacuees be allowed to land. After receiving instructions from London, a landing was allowed as long as the evacuees returned when other ships arrived, and by 13 July the re-evacuation had been completed.

=== Intervention of Joshua Hassan and Peter Isola before the United Nations ===
In September 1963, Chief Minister Joshua Hassan, and Leader of the Opposition Peter Isola, travelled to New York City to intervene before the United Nations Decolonisation Committee as "petitioners" from Gibraltar. Crowds filled John Mackintosh Square as they gathered to wish them well and then again to welcome them back. Their homecoming took place on 24 September 1963 and was commemorated in the painting The Triumphal Welcome depicting the scene at John Mackintosh Square, authored by local artist Ambrose Avellano.

=== Gibraltar National Day ===
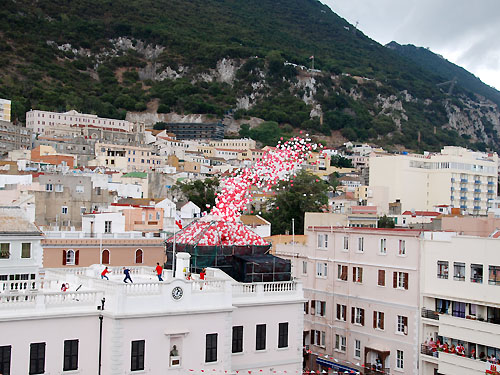
The symbolic release of 30,000 red and white balloons from the roof of the Parliament Building, National Day 2009.

In 1992, John Mackintosh Square was the venue chosen by the then Chief Minister of Gibraltar, Joe Bossano, to celebrate the first Gibraltar National Day. This National Day is celebrated annually on 10 September to commemorate Gibraltar's first sovereignty referendum of 1967, in which Gibraltarian voters were asked whether they wished to either pass under Spanish sovereignty, or remain under British sovereignty, with institutions of self-government, overwhelmingly opting to remain British. However, the first National Day was so successful that the avalanche of people that turned up could not fit into John Mackintosh Square. Therefore, in 1993 the venue was changed to the larger Grand Casemates Square. This remained the main venue almost continuously until 2008 when the official celebrations were returned to John Mackintosh Square, with the Mayor conducting the main event and presenting the Gibraltar Medallion of Honour from the balcony of the City Hall. The Gibraltar National Day Declaration is also read, and a symbolic release of 30,000 red and white balloons from the roof of the Parliament Building follows.

=== Miss World 2009 homecoming ===
Miss Gibraltar 2009, Kaiane Aldorino, made history on 12 December 2009 as she was crowned Miss World in Johannesburg, South Africa, becoming the first ever Miss Gibraltar to achieve this. Chief Minister Peter Caruana hailed her win as a "wonderful achievement for her and for Gibraltar" and promised a "homecoming fit for a queen". Consequently, the Government of Gibraltar announced she would be flown into Gibraltar from London on a private jet and issued a press release in which it detailed the events that would take place upon Kaiane's arrival. These included a public greeting at Gibraltar Airport, a parade through Main Street, where Kaiane would ride in the same open-top car as Princess Diana and Prince Charles during their honeymoon visit to Gibraltar. On 17 December 2009, Gibraltar came to a standstill as she paraded down Main Street preceded by the band of the Royal Gibraltar Regiment and then appeared at the City Hall balcony where she greeted the crowds at John Mackintosh square. This was followed by a press conference and reception at the Rock Hotel. The celebrations culminated with a fireworks display from Gibraltar Harbour.

== Notable buildings on John Mackintosh Square ==
- Gibraltar City Hall
- Gibraltar Parliament

== See also ==
- Main Street, Gibraltar
- Grand Casemates Square

== Bibliography ==
- Benady, Tito (1996). The Streets of Gibraltar. Gibraltar Books. pp. 17–18. ISBN 0-948466-37-5.
- J. D. Mather (2004). 200 years of British hydrogeology. Geological Society. ISBN 1-86239-155-6.
- Bond, Peter (2003). 300 Years of British Gibraltar 1704-2004. Peter-Tan Publishing Co.
