= Gustavo Bacarisas =

Gibraltarian painter

Gustavo Bacarisa
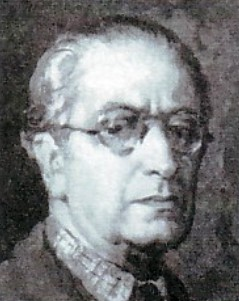
- Born: 1872; Gibraltar
- Died: 1971; Seville, Spain
- Spouse: Elsa Jernås
- Awards: Member of the Real Academia de Bellas Artes de San Fernando; Honorary professor Real Academia de Bellas Artes de Santa Isabel de Hungría

Gustavo Bacarisa (1872–1971) GMH was a Gibraltarian painter. He was born in Gibraltar and died in Seville, Spain. His work, of a figurative style and varied themes, is characterised by the rich use of colour. He was married to Swedish artist and designer Elsa Jernås.

== Career ==
Bacarisas studied in Paris, France and worked in Buenos Aires, Argentina, until 1916. He later relocated to the Andalusian capital of Seville. He also travelled to Sweden to create sets and figurines for the opera Carmen. He did the same for the premier of El amor brujo (Spanish: Love, the Magician) at the Teatro Español in Madrid. During the Spanish Civil War, he relocated to the Portuguese island of Madeira, returning in 1937 to Gibraltar. At the end of the Second World War, he moved to Spain, settling down in Seville.

Bacarisas exhibited his work in many Spanish cities as well as abroad. He was granted a gold medal and the title of honorary professor by the Real Academia de Bellas Artes de Santa Isabel de Hungría (Spanish: Royal Academy of Fine Arts of St Isabella of Hungary) and was made a member of the Real Academia de Bellas Artes de San Fernando.

== See also ==
- List of Gibraltarians
