= Emma Larios Gaxiola =

Mexican politician

- Born: 17 June 1954 (age 71); Hermosillo, Sonora, Mexico
- Occupation: Politician
- Political party: PAN

Emma Lucía Larios Gaxiola (born 17 June 1954) is a Mexican politician affiliated with the PAN. As of 2014 she served as Senator of the LXI Legislature of the Mexican Congress representing Sonora as replacement of Guillermo Padrés Elías.
