= Gibraltar City Hall =

Former city hall for Gibraltar

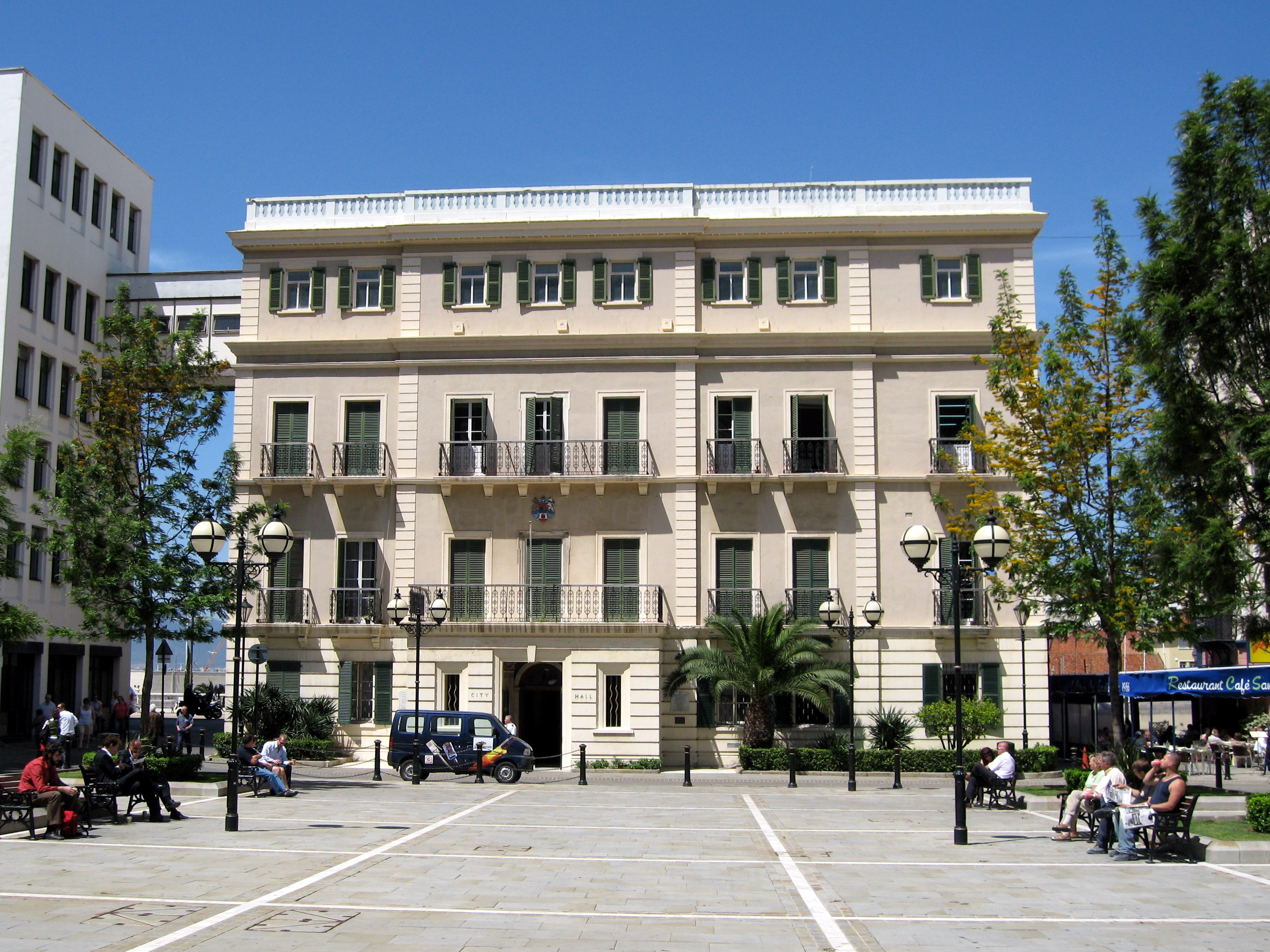
- Main façade of the Gibraltar City Hall, from John Mackintosh Square

- Location within Gibraltar
- Former names: Club House, Club House Hotel, Connaught House
- Alternative names: City Hall

General information
- Architectural style: Regency
- Location: Gibraltar, John Mackintosh Square
- Coordinates: 36.140853°N 5.354454°W
- Current tenants: Anthony Lima, Mayor of Gibraltar
- Completed: 1819
- Owner: Government of Gibraltar

The Gibraltar City Hall is the former city hall for Gibraltar, centrally located within the city at the west end of John Mackintosh Square. It is the office of the mayor of Gibraltar and since 2023 has been the location of the Registry of Marriages.

== History ==
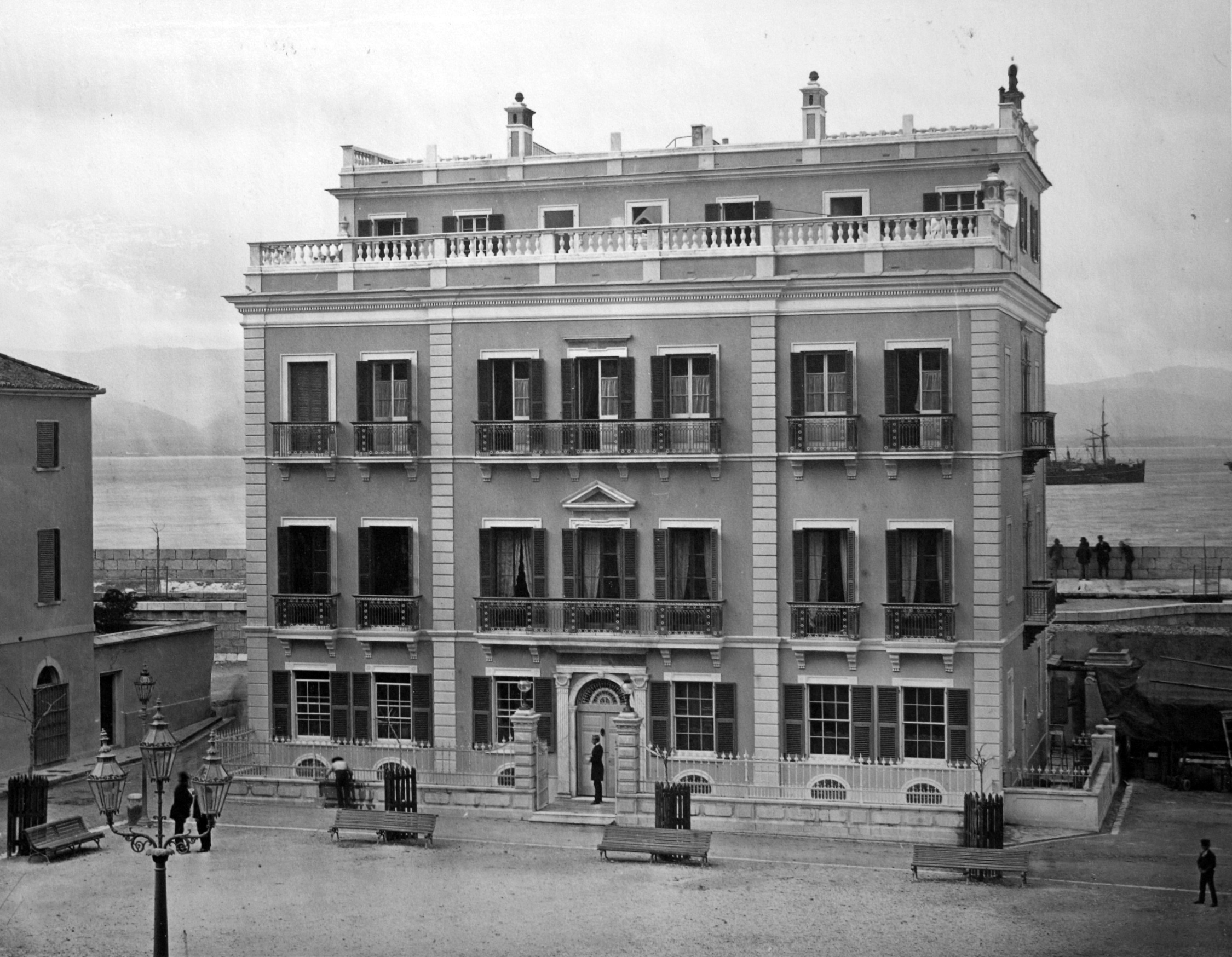
Connaught House in 1879

The building was a private mansion built in 1819 by Aaron Cardozo, a prosperous merchant of Jewish Portuguese descent who had settled in Gibraltar, as his family home. It was the grandest private mansion ever seen in Gibraltar. The three-storey house dominated John Mackintosh Square.

It was erected on the site of the old hospital and chapel of La Santa Misericordia (English: The Holy Mercy) and later prison. As a non-Protestant, Cardozo was not legally allowed to own property in Gibraltar. However, as he had been a close friend of Lord Nelson and had supplied his fleet, he was eventually granted a site to build a house in the Alameda on the condition that it be "an ornament" to the square. Its cost was about £40,000.

After his death in 1834, his mansion was leased to John Ansaldo as a hotel, the Club House Hotel. It was bought in 1874 by Pablo Antonio Larios, a wealthy businessman and banker, Gibraltarian-born but member of a Spanish family, the Larios, who completely refurbished the building. In 1922, his son Pablo Larios, Marquis of Marzales (Master of the Royal Calpe Hunt for 45 years), sold the building to the Gibraltar colonial authorities, which intended to turn it into a post office. However, it eventually became the seat of the newly formed Gibraltar City Council. Since 1926, the Gibraltar telephone service was operated by the City Council, and an automatic exchange serving the territory was installed in the last floor of the building, The building was later extended (including a new storey and a new body to the north), modifying its original symmetry. Nowadays, it houses the Mayor's Parlour.

== National Gallery ==
In 2015, HM Government of Gibraltar set up the Mario Finlayson National Art Gallery at the City Hall. The gallery exhibits the works of prominent Gibraltarian artists such as Gustavo Bacarisas, Jacobo Azagury, Leni Mifsud, and Rudesindo Mannia. Some works by Mario Finlayson are also on display.

== Bibliography ==
- Benady, Tito (1996). The Streets of Gibraltar. Gibraltar Books. pp. 17–19. ISBN 0-948466-37-5.
- Bond, Peter (2003). 300 Years of British Gibraltar 1704-2004. Peter-Tan Publishing Co.
- Stephen Constantine (2009). Community and identity. The making of modern Gibraltar since 1704. Manchester University Press. ISBN 978-0-7190-8054-8.
- Romero Frías, Rafael (1994). Fundación Arte y Tecnología de Telefónica (ed.). Colección Histórico-Tecnológica de Telefónica (in Spanish). Madrid. ISBN 84-604-9745-3.
