= Joseph Gaggero =

Gibraltarian businessman (1927–2012)

Joseph Gaggero CBE, GMH, KHS, KFO, (20 November 1927 – 10 February 2012) was a Gibraltarian businessman. He was president of The Bland Group of Companies, which concentrate their business in shipping, aviation and travel.

== Early and personal life ==
Joseph Gaggero was born in Gibraltar on 20 November 1927, to Sir George Gaggero OBE JP and Mabel Andrews-Speed. He was educated at Worth School, West Sussex and later at Downside School, Bath. He married Marilys Healing in 1958 and had a son and a daughter. He was later married to Cristina Russo from 1994 to 2008. In his spare time he enjoyed painting and travel. Gaggero was also a member of the Travellers Club in London and Valderrama Golf Club in San Roque.

== Career ==
Gaggero was president of the Bland Group, an international travel, shipping and tourism based group of companies comprising fifteen trading enterprises established in the United Kingdom and the Western Mediterranean (Spain, Gibraltar and Morocco).

== Charitable work ==
The Gaggero Foundation is an independent private charitable body established by his son James Gaggero through the Bland Group in 2008. The Foundation's purpose is to support and initiate programs that aid education, family welfare and community health. The Foundation encourages applications that are consistent with these aims, and has particular interest in supporting the geographic areas of Gibraltar, Morocco and Andalusia.

== Other activities and honours ==
He was a director of the Gibraltar Chamber of Commerce between 1951 and 1956, Head of Gibraltar Tourist Board 1955–59. Gaggero also served on or led various other Government committees and Gibraltar Trading Associations. He was appointed Honorary Vice Consul for Sweden in Gibraltar 1958 (under his father Sir George Gaggero, Consul with title of a Consul General), Consul 1967 and Consul General 1973. Resigned in 1996.

- Gibraltar Philharmonic Orchestra
- KHS (Vatican), Commander,
- Royal Order of the Polar Star (Sweden) 1991
- President British Moroccan Soc, Liveryman, GAPAN 1997+
- Patron, Hispanic British Foundation, 1999
- Publication: Running with the Baton (autobiog), 2005
- Commander, Royal Order Al Alaoui (Morocco), 2006
- Inducted: Hall of Fame, Travel and Hospitality Industry, 2007
- Awarded: UK Air League Founders Medal, 2007
- Vice-President Moroccan-British Business Council 2007+
- Hon Vice-President 2009
- Awarded Gibraltar Medallion of Honour, 2009
- KFO – Knight of the Royal Order of Francis I 2011

== Death ==
Gaggero died on 10 February 2012 in London. The Gibraltar Chronicle broke the news on its Twitter service in the evening of the same day.
