= Languages of Gibraltar =

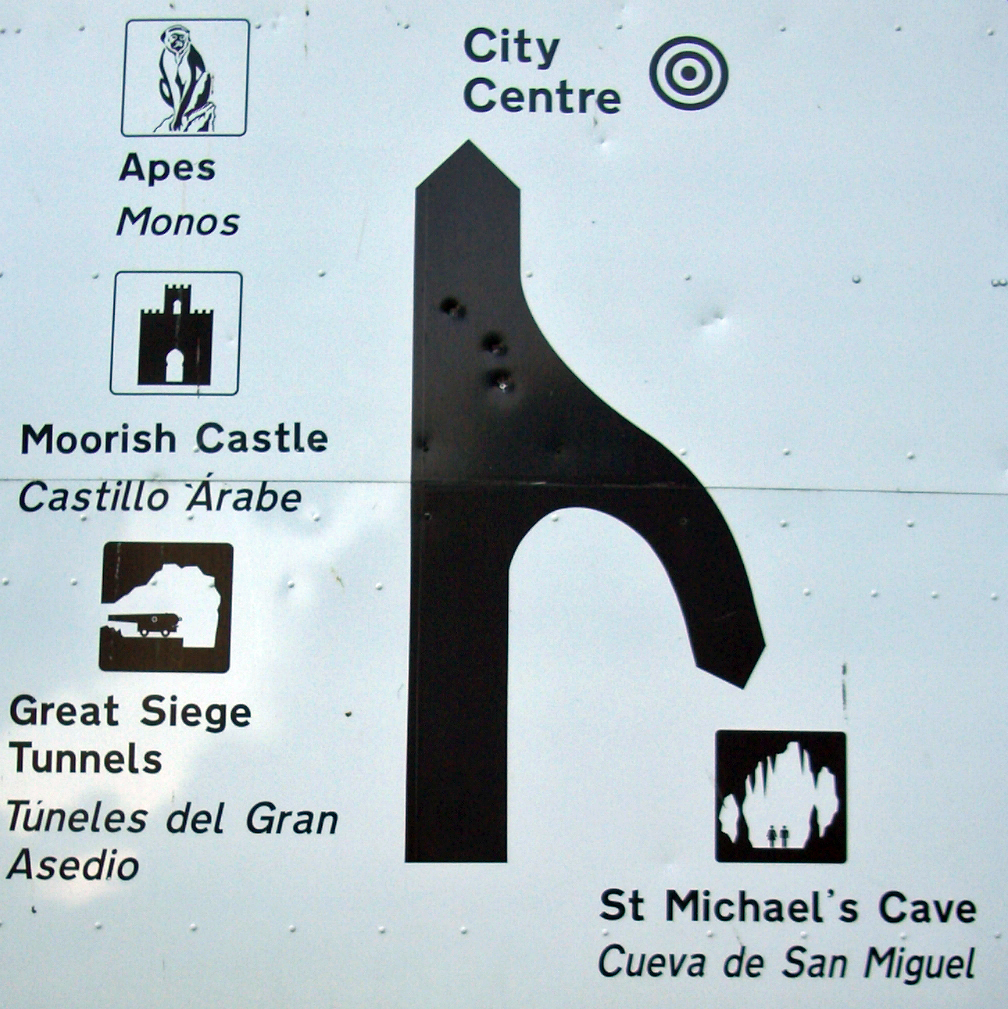
- One of the many bilingual signs found in the Gibraltar Nature Reserve, printed in both English and Spanish.
- Official: English
- Recognised: Spanish
- Main: English
- Vernacular: Llanito
- Minority: Maghrebi Arabic, Sindhi, Hindi, Maltese, Hebrew
- Signed: British Sign Language
- Keyboard layout: British (QWERTY)

The sole official language of Gibraltar, a British overseas territory, is English, which is used by the Government and in schools. The eponymous Gibraltarian English accent is spoken in the territory.

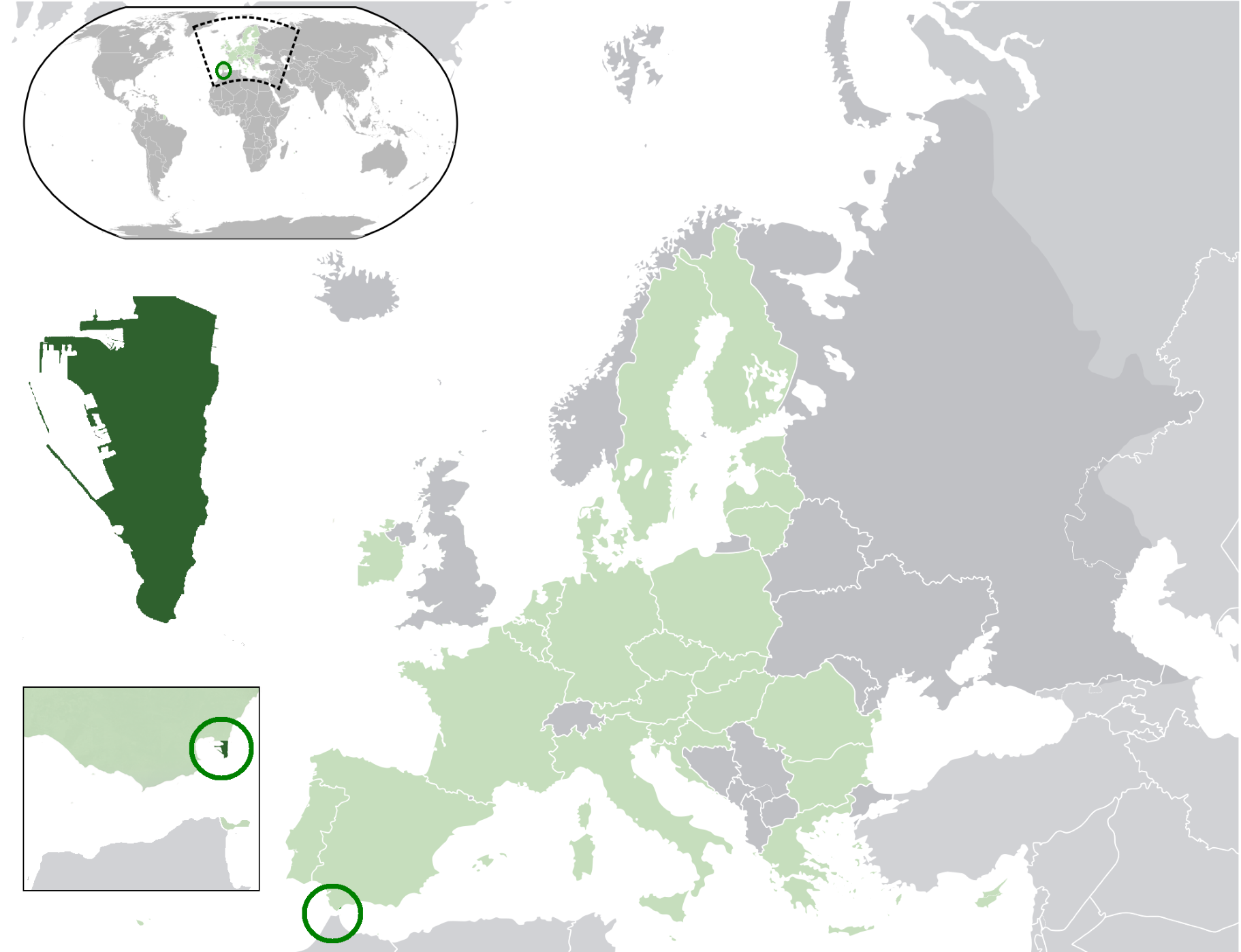
Many of Gibraltar's linguistic influences come from its neighbours, Spain and Morocco.

Most locals are bilingual, also speaking Spanish, because of Gibraltar's proximity to Spain. Most Gibraltarians converse in Llanito, their vernacular which is mostly based on Andalusian Spanish but with numerous loanwords from English as well other Mediterranean languages. However, because of the varied mix of ethnic groups which reside there, other languages such as Moroccan Berber, Moroccan Arabic and Hindi are also spoken in Gibraltar.

== Llanito ==
Llanito (pronounced [ʎaˈnito]) is the main local vernacular, and is unique to Gibraltar. It consists of a mix of Andalusian Spanish and British English, as well as elements from such languages as Maltese, Portuguese, Ligurian of the Genoese variety and Haketia.

Andalusian Spanish is the main constituent of Llanito, but is also heavily influenced by British English. However, it borrows words and expressions of many other languages, with over 500 words of Genoese and Hebrew origin. It also typically involves code-switching to English.

The term Llanito is also used as an alternative demonym to Gibraltarian.

== Spanish ==
Over the course of its history, the Rock of Gibraltar has changed hands many times, among Spanish, Moorish, and British hands, although it has been consistently under British control since the Treaty of Utrecht in 1713. Before the British takeover, Spanish was widely spoken, but afterwards as most residents left the Rock, the language had a much smaller population (in 1753 there were just 185 Spaniards, and only 134 in 1777). However, the border with Spain has been opened since 1985, allowing easier travel in and out of Spain, one of the factors which has given Andalusian Spanish considerable presence in Gibraltar. In 2001, there were 326 people of Spanish nationality in Gibraltar, and a large number of "Frontier Workers" who commute there for work.

== Berber language and Maghrebi Arabic ==
Owing to its close proximity to Morocco and Algeria, the Berber language and Maghrebi Arabic are spoken by the Moroccan and other North African minorities in the city.

In 2001, there were 961 Moroccans in Gibraltar.

== Other languages ==
Hindi and Sindhi are also spoken by the Indian community of Gibraltar. Similarly, Genoese was spoken in Catalan Bay well into the 19th century, dying out in the early decades of the 20th, by some families of Genoese descent. Hebrew is also spoken by some in the Jewish community.

== See also ==
- Gibraltarian English
- Languages of Iberia
- Languages of the United Kingdom
