= History of the Genoese in Gibraltar =

Gibraltarians of Genoese descent

Genoese Gibraltarians
Genovesi di Gibilterra (Italian)
- The Flags of Genoa and Gibraltar.

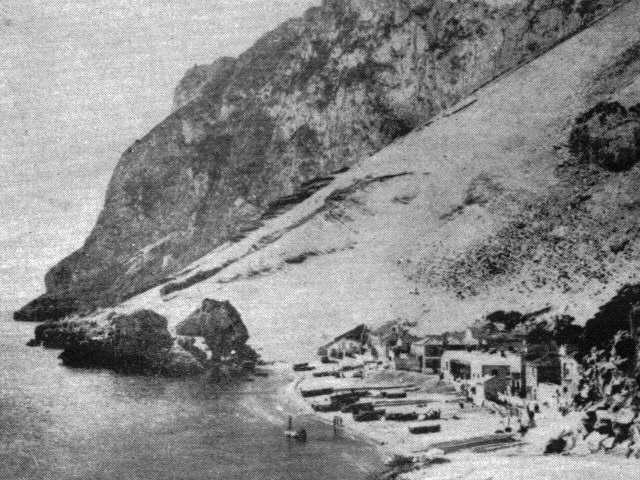
- Early view of Catalan Bay or La Caleta (a fishing village on the east side of the Rock of Gibraltar where Genoese fishermen settled) looking south from the top of the access road - late 19th century. The round shaped rock which juts out into the sea is commonly known as "la mamela" (Italian: la mammella, the breast), the name given to it by the early Genoese settlers as it resembles a woman's breast when viewed from the shore.

Total population
- c. 6,000 (by ancestry, about 20% of the total population)

Regions with significant populations
- Gibraltar

Languages
- English · Spanish · Italian · Genoese

Religion
- Roman Catholic

Related ethnic groups
- Other Ligurians, other Gibraltarians

Genoese Gibraltarians (Italian: genovesi di Gibilterra) have existed in Gibraltar since the 16th century and later became an important part of the population. It is an ethnic community made up of descendants of Genoese and Ligurians who settled in Gibraltar over the centuries. The population of Gibraltar with Genoese (or Italian) surnames is around 20% of the total.

== History ==
There is much evidence of a community of emigrants from Genoa, who moved to Gibraltar in the 16th century and that were more than a third of the Gibraltar population in the first half of the 18th century. Although labeled as "Genoese", they were not only from the city of Genoa but from all of Liguria, a northern Italian region that was the center of the maritime Republic of Genoa.

After the conquest of Gibraltar from Spain in 1704, nearly all the original Spanish population moved away. Among those who stayed there were 30 Genoese families, most of them forming a group resident in Catalan Bay which worked as fishermen. Their main activities in the years following the conquest of Gibraltar and its formal transfer to Great Britain were not only related to fishing, but to craftsmanship and commerce.

According to the 1725 census, on a total civilian population of 1113 there were 414 Genoese, 400 Spaniards, 137 Jews, 113 Britons and 49 others (mainly Portuguese and Dutch). In the 1753 census the Genoese were the biggest group (nearly 34%) of civilian residents in the Gibraltar and up until 1830 Italian was spoken together with English and Spanish and used in official announcements.

Many Genoese in the late 18th century arrived to work for the garrison and later went on to form the basis of Gibraltar's civilian police force - the Genoese Guard.

"In 1740, English Law was introduced in Gibraltar and in 1753 the first Justices of the Peace were appointed....During this period the Military Authorities were experiencing great difficulties with Army deserters going into the Kingdom of Spain and thus a group of inhabitants were recruited to act as Frontier Guards. This group became known as the Genoese Guard and in time came to serve as a rudimentary Police Force when they were called upon to support the Military Authorities when dealing with civilians. Sergeants were appointed within the Genoese Guard and their titles "Jews Sergeant" and "Spanish Sergeant" reflected their role within the sectors of the community. The Genoese Guard were subsequently disbanded sometime after the Seven Year War."

After Napoleonic times many Sicilians and some Tuscans migrated to Gibraltar, but the Genoese and Ligurians remained the majority of the Italian group.

Indeed, the Genoese dialect was spoken in Catalan Bay well into the 20th century, dying out in the 1970s.

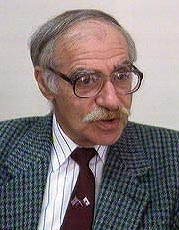
Joe Bossano, Chief Minister of Gibraltar from 1988 to 1996, is of Genoese descent.

Today, the descendants of the Genoese community of Gibraltar consider themselves Gibraltarians and most of them promote the autonomy of Gibraltar.

Their most renowned representatives are: Joe Bossano (chief minister of Gibraltar for eight years), Adolfo Canepa (chief minister in 1987) and Kaiane Aldorino (Miss World 2009).

== La Caleta: a Genoese fishing village ==
Historically, Catalan Bay (called originally La Caleta) had been populated by Genoese fishermen who were part of a much larger settlement pattern along the eastern coast of The Rock during the 17th and 18th centuries.

In the 18th century the Genoese dialect was so widely spoken in Gibraltar that Government notices were also published in Italian (alongside English and Spanish). Genoese was spoken by most people in La Caleta well into the 19th century, dying out in the late decades of the 20th century (in the 1970s researcher Fiorenzo Toso interviewed old La Caleta fishermen speaking some genoese words).

There has been some discussion that the British may have mixed up Catalans with Genoese but it is by no means clear why they would suffer such a confusion especially since there is other evidence which demonstrates that the British were perfectly aware that the residents of La Caleta were Genoese: the orders for the siege of 1727 refer to this bay as the Genoese Cove and the numerous 18th and 19th century census record large numbers of people born in Genoa, not in Catalonia. It is even possible a confusion between the letters of "Calata" and "Catala" in the early English pronunciation of the Bay.

During the 19th century only fishermen were permitted to live in Catalan Bay. The families who live in the village today are mainly descendants of these Genoese fishermen and are colloquially known as caleteños.

== Genoese heritage ==
=== Architecture ===
Genoese heritage is evident throughout Gibraltar but especially in the architecture of the town's older buildings which are influenced by traditional Genoese housing styles featuring internal courtyards (also known as "patios").

Until the 1980s, most Gibraltarians lived densely packed around these communal patios. A prominent feature of Gibraltar's architecture is the traditional Genoese wooden window shutters.

=== Cuisine ===
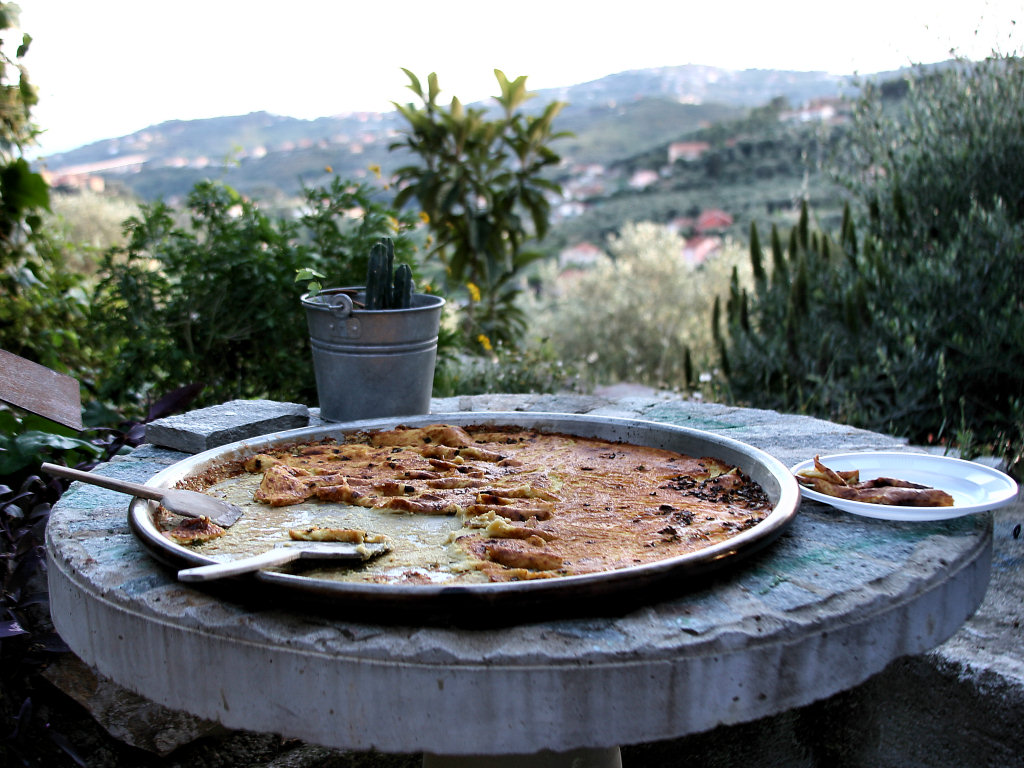
Gibraltarian Calentita is very similar to the Genoese Farinata.

Many of the Gibraltarian cuisine's roots also lie in Genoa. The most notable dish of Genoese origin (in spite of its Spanish name) is Gibraltar's national dish, calentita. It is a chickpea flour-based flatbread similar to the Italian farinata.

Even the Gibraltarian panissa, a bread-like dish similar to the calentita, shares its Italian origins: it is a descendant of the Genoese dish with the same name "panissa".

Other important Gibraltarian dishes such as rosto, penne and meat in a tomato sauce, is also of Genoese origin.

=== Society ===
Genoese heritage is also present in the upper strata of Gibraltarian society: this class consists of a few families of Genoese origin.

While the upper middle class consists of Catholic, Jewish, and Hindu merchants and lawyers, the working class is made up of families of Spanish, Maltese, and Italian (mainly Sicilian) origin.

== Current population ==
The present-day descendants of the Genoese settlers in Gibraltar are fully integrated as Gibraltarians. The Genoese of Gibraltar number about 6,000, corresponding to about 20% of the total population.

This group is integrated in the Gibraltarian society and there it is no association related specifically to them. The Genoese in Gibraltar have left partially their presence even in the Llanito, the local Gibraltarian dialect used by most of the descendants of these Ligurians, that has nearly 700 words borrowed from the Genoese dialect.

Some scholars (like Manuel Cavilla) believe that the word "Llanito" is of Italian origin, because it comes from the common diminutive of the Italian name Gianni (John in English), pronounced in the Genoese dialect "iannito".

According to the Italian scholar Giulio Vignoli, "Llanito" originally -in the first decades of the 19th century- was full of Genoese words, later substituted mainly by Spanish words and by some English words.

=== Research on Genoese surnames in Gibraltar ===
Research by Fiorenzo Toso in 2000 into the names of Gibraltarian families of Genoese origins was "based on original research and deals with the Ligurian origin of many of the surnames currently found in Gibraltar. It points out the areas of origin of these surnames, discusses their etymology and gives their present frequency. Remarks are made on Liguria's historical importance in this locality, and above all on the linguistic, ethnographic and cultural consequences of this influence."

From this research, it appears that most of the emigration from the Italian region Liguria was from the areas of Genoa and Savona, and some Sicilian surnames (like Caruana) are mistakenly believed to be Maltese (while they are from Sicilians who immigrated to Malta during the Italian Renaissance).

These are the most common Genoese surnames in Gibraltar, according to Toso's research. The number of Gibraltarians who have these names, according to Gibraltar's Yellow Pages are provided in parentheses.

- Parody (45), Baglietto (45), Danino (33), Olivero (50), Robba (32), Montegriffo (34), Chipolina (25), Ferrary (35), Ramagge (24), Picardo (6), Isola (24), Canepa (12), Cavilla (14) and Bossano (15).

=== Notable people ===
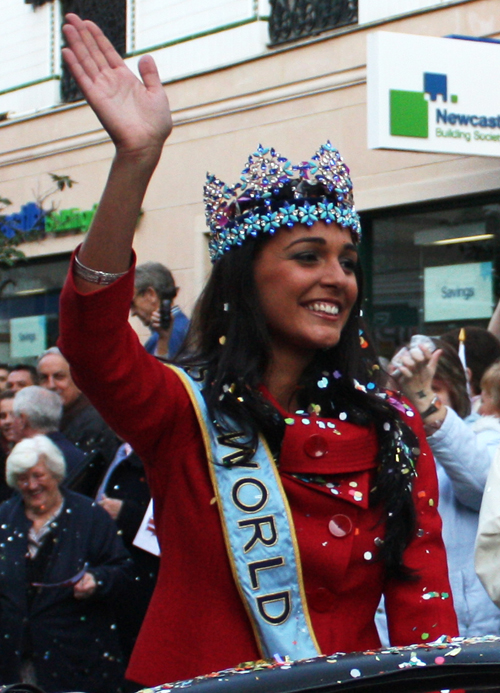
Kaiane Aldorino, Miss World 2009, during her homecoming celebrations in Gibraltar

Notable Gibraltarians of Genoese descent include:

- Kaiane Aldorino (Miss World 2009)
- Joe Bossano (Chief Minister 1988–1996)
- Adolfo Canepa (Chief Minister 1987)
- Stuart Cavilla (Breed 77 bassist)
- John Galliano (Fashion designer)
- Paul Isola (Breed 77 vocalist)
- Peter Isola (politician)
- Krystle Robba (Miss Gibraltar 2008)
- Fabian Picardo (Chief Minister 2011–present)
- Albert Risso Trade Unionist and Politician

== See also ==
- History of the Jews in Gibraltar
- History of the Maltese in Gibraltar
- Gibraltarians
- Languages of Gibraltar
- History of Genoa
- Italian diaspora

== Bibliography ==
- Archer, Edward. Gibraltar, identity and empire. Volume 33 of "Routledge advances in European politics". Routledge. London, 2006 ISBN 0-415-34796-3
- Kramer, Johannes. English and Spanish in Gibraltar. Helmut Buske. Hamburg, 1986
- Levey, David. Language change and variation in Gibraltar. John Benjamins Publishing Company. London, 2008 ISBN 90-272-1862-5
- Sancho de Sopranis. Los Genoveses en Cadiz antes de 1600. "Cuaderno n° 4 of the Sociedad de Estudios Historicos de Jerez de la Frontera" (addition n° 2). Larache. 1939
- Toso, Fiorenzo. Una lingua del mare. Il Genovese tra Liguria e Mediterraneo. Atti del Convegno Internazionale di Studi (Genova-Arenzano, novembre 1998).
- Toso, Fiorenzo. Linguistica di aree laterali ed estreme. Contatto, interferenza, colonie linguistiche e "isole" culturali nel Mediterraneo occidentale. Le Mani editori (Udine, Centro Internazionale sul Plurilinguismo) Recco, 2008
- Vignoli, Giulio. Gli Italiani Dimenticati Ed. Giuffè. Roma, 2000
