= Gibraltarian English (disambiguation) =

Gibraltarian English can refer to:

- Gibraltarian English, the accent of English spoken in the Gibraltar.
- Llanito (or Yanito), an Andalusian Spanish based vernacular spoken in the Gibraltar.
