= Héctor Licudi =

Héctor Licudi Bottaro (Gibraltar – 21 October 1959 in Madrid) was a Gibraltarian journalist and writer. His most important work was Barbarita, a novel written in Spanish and published in English and Spanish in 1929. It explores the relationship of Gibraltar and the United Kingdom.
