= Montserratians in the United Kingdom =

Total population
- Montserratian born 7,284 (2011 Census)

Regions with significant populations
- England

Languages
- English (British English, Caribbean English)

Religion
- Christianity

Related ethnic groups
- British African-Caribbean community

Montserratians in the United Kingdom including Montserratian-born immigrants to the United Kingdom and their British-born descendants constitute the second largest number of overseas British citizens living in the UK (behind Gibraltarians).

== History and settlement ==
The Caribbean island of Montserrat has experienced British rule for centuries. British control was established in 1632 and to this day it remains an overseas territory of the United Kingdom. This in itself makes it easy for the overseas British citizens to migrate to the UK with few problems.

In 1995, the island's Soufrière Hills volcano erupted, destroying a large percentage of the island, including its capital city, Plymouth. The volcano later continued to erupt over the following years, and ultimately two thirds of Montserrat's population left the island. The UK immediately offered assistance, and began to welcome large numbers of refugees from the island. The people of Montserrat were granted full residency rights in the UK in 1998, and citizenship was granted four years later.

== Demographics ==
According to the 2001 UK Census 7,983 Montserratian-born people were residing in the UK (almost twice the population of Montserrat itself). According to the 2011 UK Census, there were 7,250 Montserratian-born residents in England, 20 in Wales, and 14 in Scotland.

== Notable individuals ==
- Notable British people of Montserratian descent
