= Tito Vallejo =

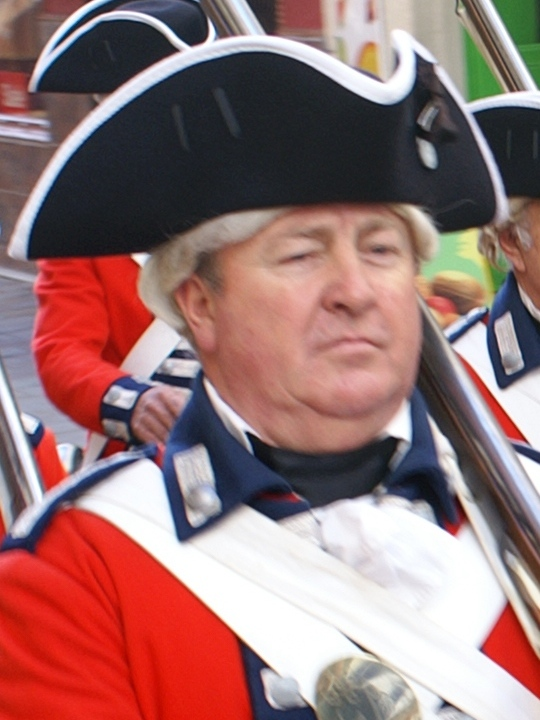
- Vallejo during a re-enactment parade in Main Street, Gibraltar
- Born: 27 October 1948 (age 77)
- Citizenship: Gibraltarian
- Occupation: Sergeant of the Gibraltar Regiment
- Employer: British Army

Ernest P. (Tito) Vallejo (born 27 October 1948) is a Gibraltarian amateur historian and former sergeant in the Gibraltar Regiment. He is known for his work with the Gibraltar Heritage Trust and serves as a guide in Gibraltar. He published a Llanito dictionary in 2000. His father is a Gibraltarian of Spanish (Andalusian) descent and his mother is Gibraltarian of English blood.
