= Demographics of Gibraltar =

Demographic features of the population of Gibraltar include ethnicity, education level, health of the populace, economic status, religious affiliations and other aspects.

== Ethnic origins ==
One of the main features of Gibraltar's population is the diversity of their ethnic origins. The demographics of Gibraltar reflects Gibraltarians' racial and cultural fusion of the many European and non-European immigrants who came to the Rock over three hundred years. They are the descendants of economic migrants that came to Gibraltar after the majority of the Spanish population left in 1704.

=== Spanish ===
The majority of the Spanish population in Gibraltar (about 5000), with few exceptions, left Gibraltar when the Dutch and English took the city in 1704. The few Spaniards who remained in Gibraltar in August 1704 were augmented by others who arrived in the fleet with Prince George of Hesse-Darmstadt, possibly some two hundred in all, mostly Catalans.

Menorcans began migrating to Gibraltar at the beginning of the common British rule in 1713, thanks to the links between both British possessions during the 18th century. Initially, Menorcans came to Gibraltar looking for work in several trades, especially when Gibraltar was rebuilt after the 1783 Grand Siege. Immigration continued even after Menorca (the original English name was "Minorca") was returned to Spain in 1802 by the Treaty of Amiens.

Immigration from Spain (like the exiles from the Spanish Civil War) and intermarriage with Spaniards from the surrounding Spanish towns was a constant feature of Gibraltar's history until the then Spanish dictator, General Francisco Franco, closed the border with Gibraltar in 1969, cutting off many Gibraltarians from their relatives on the Spanish side of the frontier.

Together, Gibraltarians of Spanish origin are one of the bigger groups (more than 24% according to last names, even more taking into account the fact that many Spanish women married native Gibraltarians).

=== British ===
Britons have come and settled or gone since the first days of the conquest. One group of Britons have had temporary residence in Gibraltar (to work in the administration and the garrison). This group, who represented a larger proportion in the beginning of the British period, are nowadays only about 3% of the total population (around 1,000 persons).

A larger group is formed by the Britons who moved to Gibraltar and settled down. Some of them, since the beginning, moved to Gibraltar to earn a living as traders and workers. Others moved to Gibraltar on a temporary assignment and then married local women. Major construction projects, such as the dockyard in the late 1890s and early 20th century brought large numbers of workers from Great Britain.

13% of Gibraltarian residents are from the United Kingdom and the electoral roll shows that 27% of Gibraltar's population has British surnames.

=== Genoese and other Italians ===
Genoese came during the 18th and 19th centuries, especially from the poorer parts of Liguria, some of them annually following fishing shoals, as repairmen for the British navy, or as successful traders and merchants; many others came during the Napoleonic period to avoid obligatory conscription to the French Army. Genoese formed the larger group of the new population in the 18th century and middle 19th century. Other Italians came from islands like Sardinia and Sicily. Nowadays, people with Genoese/Italian last names represent about 20% of the population.

=== Portuguese ===
Portuguese were one of the earliest groups to move to Gibraltar, especially from the Algarve region in the far south of Portugal. Most of them went to work as labourers and some as traders. Their number increased significantly during the 18th century. Interestingly, in 1814 out of 49 lightermen, 43 were from Portugal and they were part of a community comprising around 650 working men aged 17 and above. A notable example of the Portuguese presence in Gibraltair is the existence, in the territory, of an example of calçada portuguesa.

A further increase in the community occurred when many Spaniards left their jobs in Gibraltar after General Franco closed the border in 1969. In the 1970s and 1980s many Portuguese worked in Gibraltar, especially in construction. Even today many Portuguese still live in the territory and many are still working in the construction sector, both working inbuilding sites and importing material from Portugal. As of 2023, for instance, a Portuguese company was in charge of building the tallest building in Gibraltar.

About 10% of last names in Gibraltar have Portuguese origin; the Portuguese are part of a wider Portuguese-speaking community comprising also Luso-Indians and Brazilians. Moreover, today there are around 500 Portuguese who live in La Línea de la Concepción and commute to Gibraltar for work every day. A notable Luso-Gibraltarian is football player Bernardo Lopes.

=== Moroccans ===
Moroccans have always had a significant presence in Gibraltar. However, the modern community has more recent origins. Moroccans began arriving in Gibraltar soon after the Spanish government imposed the first restrictions on Spanish workers in Gibraltar in 1964. By the end of 1968 there were at least 1,300 Moroccan workers resident in Gibraltar and this more than doubled following the final closure of the frontier with Spain in June 1969. There is also a significant number of Moroccan Jews in Gibraltar, representing Jews of both Sephardic origin and Arabic speaking Jews of Morocco (although almost no Gibraltarian Jews today speak Arabic as a first language). Most notably the Hassan family which runs Gibraltar's largest law firm Hassans International Law Firm and the late Sir Joshua Hassan who served four terms as Chief Minister for a total of 20 years.

=== Other groups ===
Other groups include:

- Malta was in the same imperial route to the east as Gibraltar. Maltese people came to Gibraltar when jobs were scarce at home, or to escape the law in Malta.
- Jews, most of them of Sephardi origin, were able to re-establish their rites, forbidden in Catholic Spain, right after the British occupation in 1704. Also a significant number of Jews from London settled in Gibraltar, especially since the Great Siege.
- Indians, came as merchants after the opening of the Suez Canal in 1870; many others migrated as workers after the closure of the frontier with Spain in 1969 to replace Spanish ones. Like mentioned above, Indian population includes Luso-Indians.
- French, many of whom came after the French Revolution in 1789, set up trade and commerce.

== National censuses ==
=== Nationality ===
Nationality	1970 census		1981 census		1991 census		2001 census		2012 census		2022 census	
Nationality	Number	Percentage	Number	Percentage	Number	Percentage	Number	Percentage	Number	Percentage	Number	Percentage
Gibraltarian	18,873	76.50%	19,825	74.87%	20,022	74.98%	22,882	83.22%	25,444	79.03%	29,072	76.63%
Other British	3,001	12.16%	3,706	14.00%	3,811	14.27%	2,627	9.55%	4,249	13.20%	5,511	14.53%
Moroccan			2,140	8.08%	1,798	6.73%	961	3.50%	522	1.62%	252	0.66%
Spanish							326	1.19%	675	2.10%	944	2.48%
Other EU							275	1.00%	785	2.44%	1,338	3.53%
Other	2,798	11.34%	808	3.05%	1,072	4.01%	424	1.54%	519	1.61%	819	2.16%
Total	24,672	100%	26,479	100%	26,703	100%	27,495	100%	32,194	100%	37,936	100%

=== Birth Place ===
Birth Place	1970 census		1981 census		1991 census		2001 census		2012 census	
Birth Place	Number	Percentage	Number	Percentage	Number	Percentage	Number	Percentage	Number	Percentage
Gibraltar	15,490	62.78%	16,640	62.84%	17,994	67.39%	19,441	70.71%	21,593	67.07%
United Kingdom	2,503	10.15%	3,459	13.06%	3,025	11.33%	3,607	13.12%	5,436	16.89%
Spain	3,392	13.75%	2,964	11.19%	2,392	8.96%	2,077	7.55%	1,985	6.17%
Portugal	248	1.01%	172	0.65%						
Morocco	2,341	9.49%	2,389	9.02%	2,021	7.57%	1,107	4.03%	954	2.96%
Other/Not stated	698	2.83%	855	3.22%	1,271	4.76%	1,263	4.59%	2,226	6.91%
Total	24,672	100%	26,479	100%	26,703	100%	27,495	100%	32,194	100%

== Population overview ==
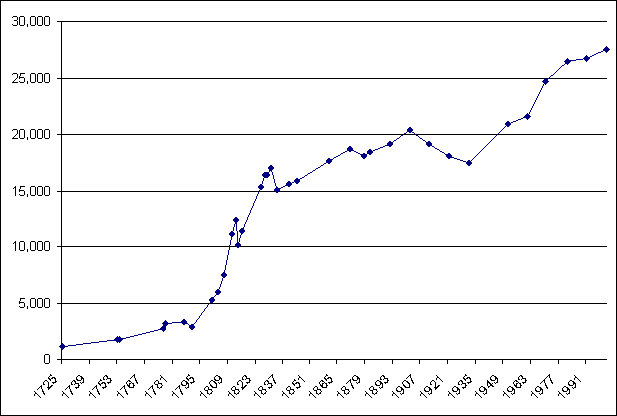
Civilian population in Gibraltar according to the censuses from 1725 to 2001

The population of Gibraltar was 29,752 in 2011.

=== Vital statistics ===
	Average population	Live births	Deaths	Natural change	Crude birth rate (per 1000)	Crude death rate (per 1000)	Natural change (per 1000)	Fertility Rate
1934	17,000	448	279	169	26.4	16.4	9.9	
1935	18,000	457	338	119	25.4	18.8	6.6	
1936	18,000	476	355	121	26.4	19.7	6.7	
1937	19,000	491	366	125	25.8	19.3	6.6	
1938	19,000	488	335	153	25.7	17.6	8.1	
1939	19,000	508	345	163	26.7	18.2	8.6	
1940^{1}	14,000	241	326	-85	17.2	23.3	-6.1	
1941^{1}	10,000	4	94	-90	0.4	9.4	-9.0	
1942^{1}	10,000	1	145	-144	0.1	14.5	-14.4	
1943^{1}	10,000	3	130	-127	0.3	13.0	-12.7	
1944^{1}	15,000	50	126	-76	3.3	8.4	-5.1	
1945	20,000	614	192	422	30.7	9.6	21.1	
1946	21,000	449	206	224	21.4	9.8	10.7	
1947	22,000	471	184	246	21.4	8.4	11.2	
1948	23,000	491	211	280	21.3	9.2	12.2	
1949	23,000	525	215	310	22.8	9.3	13.5	
1950	23,000	459	207	252	20.0	9.0	11.0	
1951	23,000	544	285	259	23.7	12.4	11.3	
1952	23,000	551	226	325	24.0	9.8	14.1	
1953	23,000	525	228	297	22.8	9.9	12.9	
1954	24,000	566	235	331	23.6	9.8	13.8	
1955	24,000	561	224	337	23.4	9.3	14.0	
1956	24,000	571	227	344	23.8	9.5	14.3	
1957	24,000	550	250	300	22.9	10.4	12.5	
1958	24,000	600	219	381	25.0	9.1	15.9	
1959	24,000	550	231	319	22.9	9.6	13.3	
1960	24,000	616	221	395	25.7	9.2	16.5	
1961	23,900	560	241	319	23.4	10.1	13.3	
1962	24,100	561	212	349	23.3	8.8	14.5	
1963	24,300	642	182	460	26.4	7.5	18.9	
1964	24,500	629	222	407	25.7	9.1	16.6	
1965	25,300	679	243	436	26.8	9.6	17.2	
1966	25,400	597	204	393	23.5	8.0	15.5	
1967	25,700	535	244	291	20.8	9.5	11.3	
1968	25,900	542	216	326	20.9	8.3	12.6	
1969	26,200	557	246	311	21.3	9.4	11.9	
1970	26,500	573	268	305	21.6	10.1	11.5	
1971	28,000	594	238	356	21.2	8.5	12.7	
1972	29,000	581	244	337	20.0	8.4	11.6	
1973	29,600	536	244	292	18.1	8.2	9.9	
1974	29,000	575	204	371	19.8	7.0	12.8	
1975	29,700	525	231	294	17.7	7.8	9.9	
1976	30,000	510	253	247	17.0	8.8	8.2	
1977	30,100	506	248	258	16.8	8.2	8.6	
1978	29,400	520	253	267	17.7	8.6	9.1	
1979	29,700	472	257	215	15.9	8.7	7.2	
1980	29,700	550	282	268	18.5	9.5	9.0	
1981	29,700	511	231	280	17.2	7.8	9.4	
1982	29,500	566	223	343	19.2	7.6	11.6	
1983	29,100	510	252	258	17.5	8.7	8.9	
1984	28,800	506	265	241	17.6	9.2	8.4	
1985	28,600	498	276	222	17.4	9.7	7.8	
1986	29,000	507	290	217	17.5	10.0	7.5	
1987	29,500	531	217	314	18.0	7.4	10.6	
1988	30,100	523	293	230	17.4	9.7	7.6	
1989	30,700	530	219	311	17.3	7.1	10.1	
1990	30,900	531	279	252	17.2	9.0	8.2	
1991	30,000	567	255	312	18.9	8.5	10.4	
1992	28,800	569	205	364	19.7	7.1	12.6	
1993	28,100	518	275	243	18.5	9.8	8.7	
1994	27,100	509	261	248	18.8	9.6	9.1	
1995	27,200	435	205	230	16.0	7.5	8.5	
1996	27,100	445	221	224	16.4	8.2	8.3	
1997	27,200	427	263	164	15.7	9.7	6.0	
1998	27,000	411	267	144	15.2	9.9	5.3	
1999	27,200	381	277	104	14.0	10.2	3.8	
2000	27,000	408	262	146	15.1	9.7	5.4	
2001	28,200	374	249	125	13.2	8.8	4.4	
2002	28,500	371	242	129	13.0	8.5	4.5	
2003	28,600	372	234	138	13.0	8.2	4.8	
2004	28,800	421	242	179	14.6	8.4	6.2	
2005	28,800	418	249	169	14.5	8.7	5.9	
2006	28,900	373	230	143	12.9	8.0	5.0	
2007	29,300	400	202	198	13.7	6.9	6.8	
2008	29,300	400	227	173	13.7	7.8	5.9	2.04 (e)
2009	29,400	417	234	183	14.2	8.0	6.2	2.13 (e)
2010	29,441	493	231	262	16.7	7.8	8.9	2.5 (e)
2011	29,752	442	241	201	14.9	8.1	6.8	2.25 (e)
2012		461	264	197	15.4	8.8	6.6	2.34 (e)
2013		426	230	196	13.0	7.0	6.0	2.14 (e)
2015		492	235	257	14.7	7.0	7.7	2.46 (e)
2016		424	249	175	12.5	7.3	5.2	2.10 (e)
2017			286					
2018		402	315					1.73 (e)
2019		423	268					1.79(e)
2020		383	270					1.6 (e)
2021		417						1.7 (e)
2022	38,600 (e)	364						1.46 (e)
2023		318						1.26 (e)
2024		331						1.31 (e)
2025		327						1.29 (e)

^{1}During World War II a large part of the civilian population (including most women) were evacuated.d

=== Structure of the population ===
Population by Sex and Age Group (Census 12.XI.2012) (Excluding military personnel, visitors and transients.):

Age group	Male	Female	Total	%
Total	16 061	16 133	32 194	100
0–4	982	970	1 952	6.06
5–9	967	927	1 894	5.88
10–14	1 050	937	1 987	6.17
15–19	1 038	959	1 997	6.20
20–24	1 042	986	2 028	6.30
25–29	999	986	1 985	6.17
30–34	1 107	1 047	2 154	6.69
35–39	1 080	1 137	2 217	6.89
40–44	1 076	1 122	2 198	6.83
45–49	1 203	1 181	2 384	7.41
50–54	1 072	1 086	2 158	6.70
55–59	1 054	987	2 041	6.34
60–64	1 034	920	1 954	6.07
65–69	853	802	1 655	5.14
70–74	563	613	1 176	3.65
75–79	456	565	1 021	3.17
80–84	297	435	732	2.27
85–89	141	296	437	1.36
90–94	37	143	180	0.56
95–99	10	29	39	0.12
100+	0	5	5	0.02
Age group	Male	Female	Total	Percent
0–14	2 999	2 834	5 833	18.12
15–64	10 705	10 411	21 116	65.59
65+	2 357	2 888	5 245	16.29

== CIA World Factbook demographic statistics ==
The following demographic statistics are from the CIA World Factbook, unless otherwise indicated.

=== Population age ===
0-14 years: 19.99% (male 3,034; female 2,888)
15-64 years: 62.62% (male 9,357; female 9,197)
65 years and over: 17.39% (male 2,523; female 2,630) (2023 est.)

=== Sex ratio ===
At birth: 1.05 males/female
0-14 years: 1.05 males/female
15-64 years: 1.02 males/female
65 years and over: 0.96 males/female
total population: 1.01 males/female (2023 est.)

The median age is:

total: 36.6 years
male: 36 years
female: 37.2 years (2023 est.)

=== Life expectancy at birth ===
total population: 80.7 years
male: 77.8 years
female: 83.6 years (2023 est.)

=== Fertility ===
1.9 children born/woman (2023 est.)

=== Infant mortality ===
total: 6.9 deaths/1,000 live births
male: 5.3 deaths/1,000 live births
female: 6.1 deaths/1,000 live births (2023 est.)

=== Nationality ===
noun: Gibraltarian(s)
adjective: Gibraltar

=== Religions ===
Roman Catholic	72.1%
Church of England	7.7%
Other Christian	3.8%
Muslim	3.6%
Jewish	2.4%
Hindu	2.0%
other or unspecified	1.3%
none	7.1%

(2012 census)

=== Languages ===
English (used in schools and for official purposes), Spanish. Most Gibraltarians converse in Llanito, an Andalusian Spanish based vernacular. It consists of an eclectic mix of Andalusian Spanish and British English as well as languages such as Maltese, Portuguese, Italian of the Genoese variety and Haketia. Among more educated Gibraltarians, it also typically involves code-switching to English. Arabic is spoken by the Moroccan community, just like Hindi and Sindhi is spoken by the Indian community of Gibraltar. Maltese is still spoken by some families of Maltese descent.
