= Max Turigìn =

Italian musician

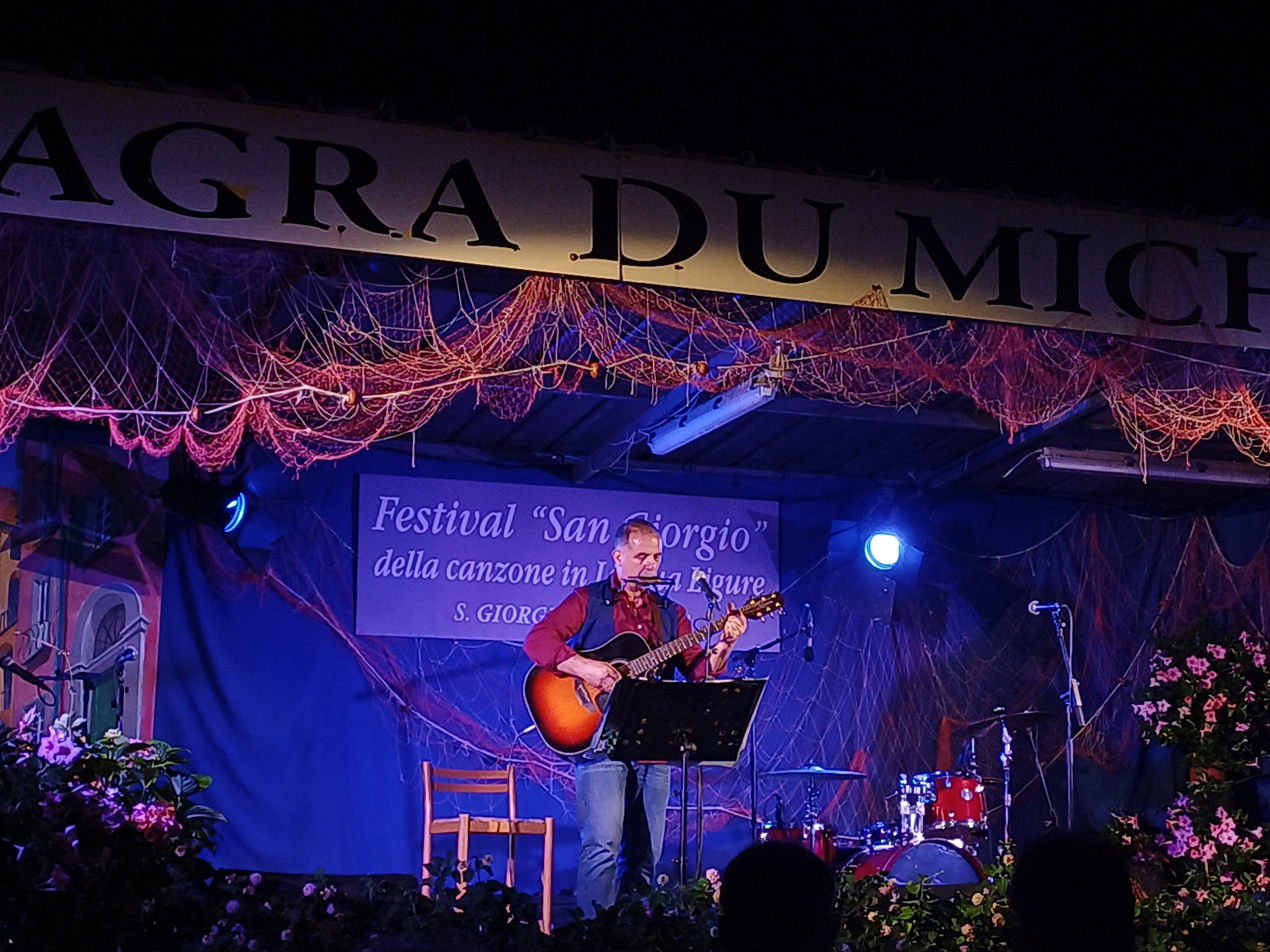
- Max Turigìn at the San Giorgio Festival of Songs in the Ligurian Language (2024)

Background information
- Born: Massimilliano Torrigino; February 15, 1972 (age 54); Busalla
- Genres: Folk; Country

Massimiliano Torrigino (born February 15, 1972), known professionally as Max Turigìn, is a Genoese folk-country-pop writer, singer, and composer who plays the guitar and also the musical instrument that has distinguished him since he was a child: the harmonica. He was born in Busalla near Genoa. He recorded his first song two days after the collapse of the Morandi bridge in Genoa, driven by a rage that gradually turned into a need to tell the story of his homeland. This led to the album Terra mia thanks to the technical collaboration of Alessandro Badano, former musician and double bass player with the band Enragedh. The album is a collection of 10 songs that tell true stories about Genoa and its surroundings, touching on various topics: fishermen, Genoese emigrants in search of fortune, soccer champions (Roberto Pruzzo, called Livio by his friends in his hometown, Crocefieschi, where Turigìn himself lives and works), social misfits and the love for his city and for the women he met along the way, going as far as the story of a man who escaped the extermination of Auschwitz and ending with the love between two wolves.

== Discography ==
Turigìn writes songs in Italian and Genoese. In 2023, Max composed "Il Tifoso", a song dedicated to the promotion to Serie A of his beloved soccer team, as well as the oldest sports club in Italy: Genoa Cricket and Football Club. Previously, in 2017, he wrote a series of short stories related to his homeland, which were collected in a limited edition booklet entitled "Storie vere e garsonàie" (English: True stories and pranks).

In May 2024, "O Cristo da Roa" was released, a song dedicated to the courage of the bearers of the statue of Christ, an ancient Genoese tradition in religious processions.

In June 2024, he wrote "Forsa Zêna", a song commemorating Christopher Columbus's adventures and other topics related to Liguria such as the Genoa soccer team.

In July 2024, he published a book of Genoese proverbs entitled "Sciûsciâ e sciorbî no se peu", true stories written by him in Italian, in the form of a novel, about proverbs in dialect. The same book also includes the song "A Zêna ghe dimmo", which participated in the San Giorgio Festival of Songs in the Ligurian Language in Albenga, Italy, in 2024.

In 2025, he won the first place in the soloist category at the San Giorgio Festival of Songs in the Ligurian Language with the song "A richêssa da lêngua" (English: "The richness of language").

Again in 2025, a new CD was released titled Terra mia containing one song in Genoese with the title "Jacob o releuià" and nine songs in Italian, one of which is dedicated to the famous Italian footballer Roberto Pruzzo, called "Livio" by his friends in their native village Crocefieschi.

In 2026, he won again the first place in the soloist category at the San Giorgio Festival of Songs in the Ligurian Language with the song "Wimbledon".
