= Gibraltarians =

Ethnic group

gibraltareños, llanitos (Spanish)

Total population
- 29,573 (2022 est.)

Regions with significant populations
- 2012 estimates, current as of 2023 (Nationality of Gibraltar residents)
- Gibraltar: 79%
- United Kingdom: 13.2%
- Spain: 2.1%
- Morocco: 1.6%
- Other European Union: 2.4%
- Other: 1.6%

Languages
- English (Gibraltarian English), Spanish (Llanito), British Sign

Religion
- Majority Christianity (particularly Roman Catholicism and Anglicanism); also Judaism, Islam and other religions

Related ethnic groups
- Spanish, Andalusians, Catalans, Italians (Genoese, Ligurians, and Sicilians), Maltese, Portuguese, Jews, Britons

Gibraltarians (Spanish: gibraltareños; colloquially: llanitos) are a sub-national people group who live in Gibraltar. Gibraltar is a British overseas territory situated near the southern tip of the Iberian Peninsula, close to Spain, at the entrance to the Mediterranean Sea; the territory includes the Rock of Gibraltar. Gibraltarians hold British citizenship. Their heritage can include diverse backgrounds such as Spanish, Genoese, British, Portuguese, Jewish, and Maltese. English and Spanish are the main languages used by Gibraltarians, and a Spanish dialect known as Llanito is Gibraltar's vernacular.

== Origins ==
Gibraltarians are an ethnic and cultural mixture of the many immigrants who came to the territory over a 300-year period. Following Gibraltar's capture from Spain by an Anglo-Dutch force in 1704, all but 70 of the existing inhabitants of Gibraltar elected to leave the territory; many settled nearby. Since then, immigrants from the United Kingdom, Spain, Italy, Malta, Portugal, Morocco, and India have settled at Gibraltar, as have Sephardic Jews from North Africa.

Historian William Jackson asserts that the people groups that formed the modern-day population of Gibraltar included the Genoese, the Spaniards, the British, the Portuguese, the Jews, and the Maltese. By the 20th century, these groups had come together to create a separate Gibraltarian identity.

Genoese and Catalans (who arrived in the fleet with Prince George of Hesse-Darmstadt) became the core of Gibraltar's first civilian population under Habsburg Gibraltar. Sephardi Jews from Tetouan in Morocco, who had previously been suppliers to English Tangier, began supplying fresh produce to Gibraltar in 1704. Most Gibraltarian surnames are of Mediterranean or British extraction. The exact breakdown (including non-Gibraltarian British residents) of family names according to the electoral register according to the 1995 Census was as follows:

Rank	Origin	Proportion (%) family names
1	British	27
2	Spanish (excluding Menorcan)	24
3	Italian	19
4	Portuguese	11
5	Maltese	8
6	Jewish	3
7	Menorcan	2
8	Other	4
9	Unassigned	2

Jews in Gibraltar by 1755 together with the Genoese in Gibraltar formed 50% of the civilian population (then 1,300). In 1888 construction of the new harbour at Gibraltar began to provide an additional coaling station on the British routes to the East. This resulted in the importation of Maltese labour both to assist in its construction, and to replace striking Genoese labour in the old coaling lighter-based industry. Maltese and Portuguese people formed the majority of this new population.

Other groups include Menorcans (due to the links between both British possessions during the 18th century; immigration began in that century and continued even after Menorca was returned to Spain in 1802 by the Treaty of Amiens), Sardinians, Sicilians and other Italians, French, and British people.

Immigration from Spain (including refugees from the Spanish Civil War) and intermarriage with Spaniards from the surrounding Spanish towns was a constant feature of Gibraltar's history until General Francisco Franco closed the border with Gibraltar, cutting off many Gibraltarians from their relatives on the Spanish side of the border. The Spanish government reopened the land border, but other restrictions remain in place.

For the period of World War II the border was closed, although Spain was nominally neutral, as Franco's regime was effectively allied with Nazi Germany.

=== Genoese/Italian surnames ===
Research by Fiorenzo Toso in 2000 about the names of Gibraltarian families of Genoese origins found that most of the emigration from the Italian region Liguria was from the areas of Genoa and Savona, and some surnames such as Caruana, often believed to be Maltese, originate from Sicilians who emigrated to Malta during the Italian Renaissance).

The following are the most common Genoese surnames in Gibraltar, according to Toso's research. The number of Gibraltarian residents who have these surnames, according to Gibraltar's Yellow Pages are provided in parentheses.

- Parody (45), Baglietto (45), Danino (33), Olivero (50), Robba (32), Montegriffo (34), Chipolina (25), Ferrary (35), Ramagge (24), Picardo (6), Isola (24), Canepa (12), Cavilla (14) and Bossano (15).

=== Maltese surnames ===
By 1912, the total number of Maltese living in Gibraltar was not above 700. Many worked in the dockyard and others operated businesses which were usually ancillary to the dockyard. However, the economy of Gibraltar was not capable of absorbing a large number of immigrants from Malta; the number of Maltese was already in decline as they returned to the Maltese Islands. Eventually those who stayed in Gibraltar became very much involved in the economic and social life of the colony, most of them also being staunch supporters of links with the UK.

Below is a list of the most common Maltese surnames in Gibraltar along with the current number of Gibraltarians who possess them.

- Azzopardi (22), Barbara (12), Borg (46), Bugeja (11), Buhagiar (14), Buttigieg (18), Zammit (37).

== Nationality ==
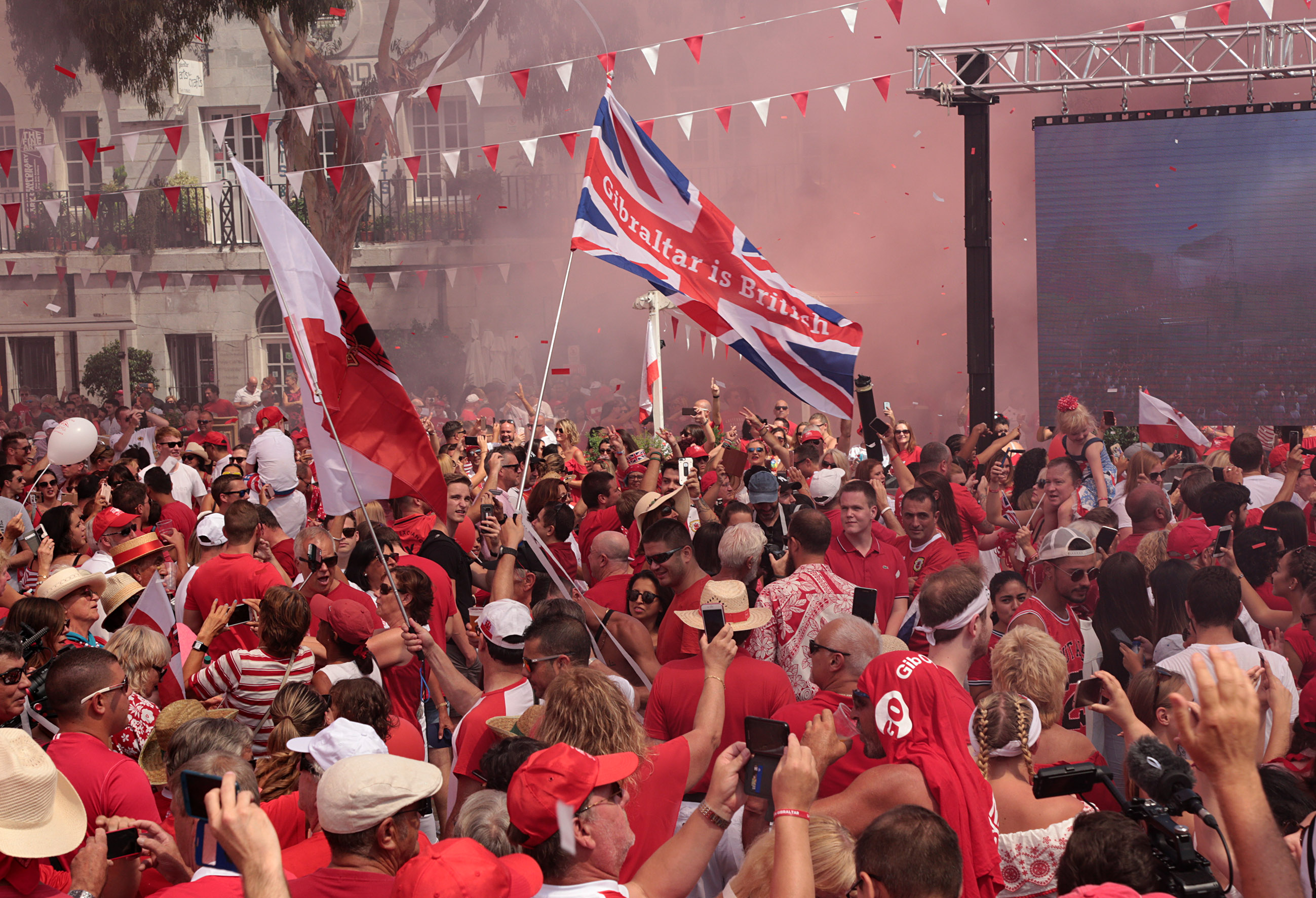
Gibraltar National Day, 10 September 2018

Gibraltarians are British citizens, albeit with a distinct identity of their own. Gibraltar is sometimes referred by the younger generation as "Gib" (/dʒɨb/). They are colloquially referred to as Llanitos (or Yanitos), both locally and in Spain. There are also other nicknames in English for Gibraltar, relating to the Rock of Gibraltar.

=== 2012 census ===
Statistics for the usually-Resident Population and Persons Present in Gibraltar. A usual resident of Gibraltar, for census purposes, is anyone who, on 12 November 2012: (a) was in Gibraltar and had stayed or intended to stay in Gibraltar for a period of 12 months or more, or; (b) has a permanent Gibraltar address but is outside Gibraltar and intends to be outside Gibraltar for less than 12 months.

Rank	Nationality	Percent of total population	Population
1	Gibraltarian	79.0%	25,444
2	UK and Other British	13.2%	4,249
3	Spanish	2.1%	675
4	Moroccan	1.6%	522
5	Other EU	2.4%	785
6	Other*	1.6%	519

(*) Includes all nationalities different from Gibraltarian, UK and other British and Moroccan.

The 2012 census showed a total Usually-Resident population of 32,194. There was a small decrease in the proportion of Gibraltarians (79.0%), an increase in the ratio of "Other British" (13.2%) and a small increase in the ratio of "Other" (6.2%).

== Culture ==
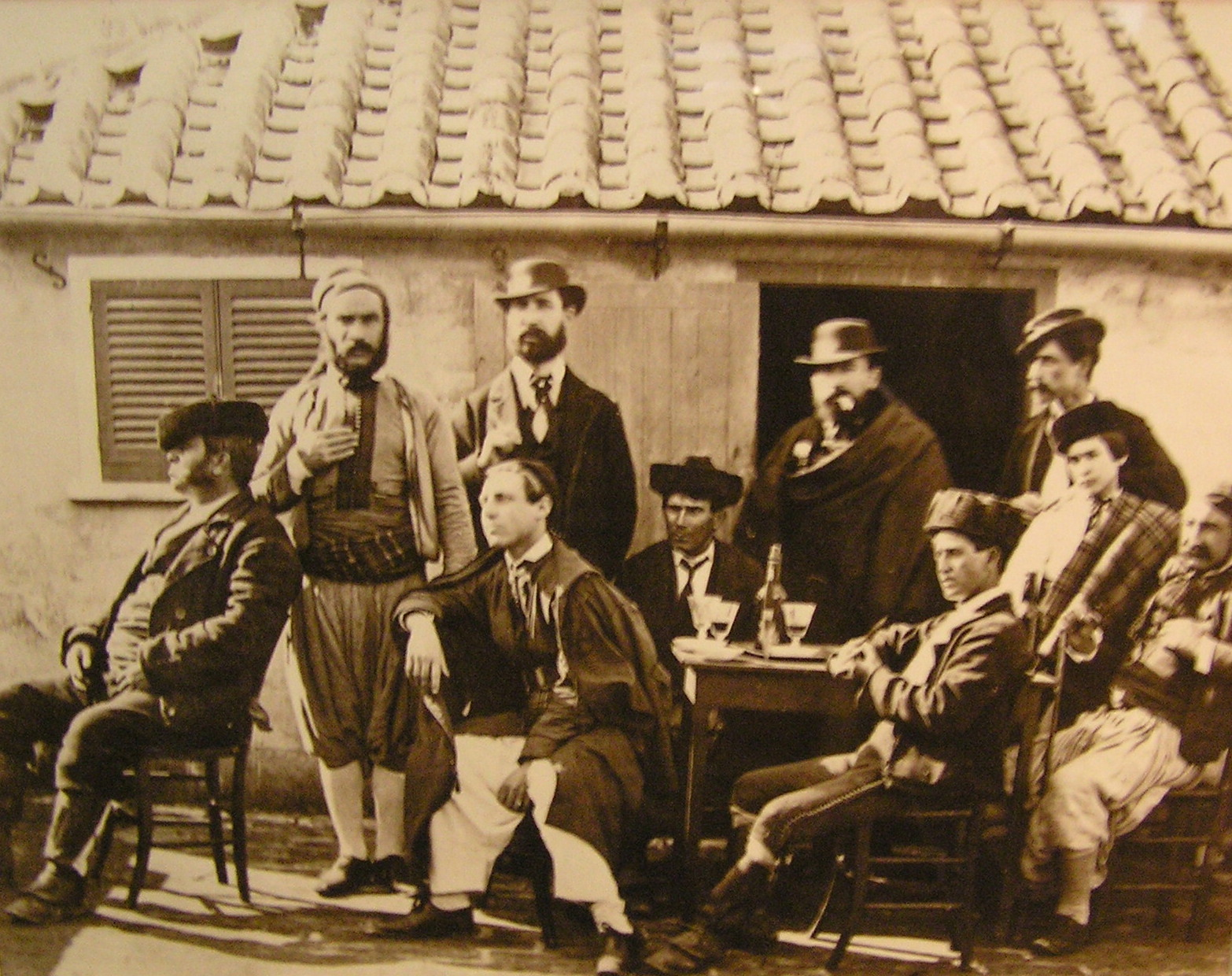
Gibraltarians, 1856

=== Religion ===
The main religion of Gibraltar is Christianity with the majority of Gibraltarians belonging to the Roman Catholic Church. Other Christian denominations include the Church of England, the Gibraltar Methodist Church, the Church of Scotland, various Pentecostal and independent churches mostly influenced by the House Church and Charismatic movements, as well as a Plymouth Brethren congregation. There is also a ward of the Church of Jesus Christ of Latter-day Saints, and Jehovah's Witnesses. There are a number of Hindu Indians, a Moroccan Muslim population, members of the Baháʼí Faith and a long-established Jewish community.

Rank	Religion	Proportion (%) of Gibraltarians
1	Roman Catholic	78.09%
2	Church of England	6.98%
3	Muslim	4.01%
4	Other Christian	3.21%
5	None	2.86%
6	Jewish	2.12%
7	Hindu	1.79%
8	Other or unspecified	0.94%

=== Languages ===
English (used in schools and for official purposes) and Spanish are the main languages of Gibraltar. Although English is the official language, Gibraltarians are typically bilingual, speaking Spanish as fluently as English. Most Gibraltarians converse in Llanito, Gibraltar's vernacular. It is an old dialect of Andalusian Spanish with modern British English influence, as well as influences from Genoese Ligurian, Maltese, Portuguese and Haketia. Gibraltarians may also code-switch to English. Hebrew is spoken by the significant Jewish community. Arabic is also spoken by the Moroccan community, similar to Hindi and Sindhi being spoken by the Indian community of Gibraltar. Maltese is still spoken by some families of Maltese descent.

Gibraltarians have a light, but unique, accent when speaking English; the accent is primarily influenced by Andalusian Spanish and southern British English. Many educated Gibraltarians are able to converse in Received Pronunciation.

== Notable Gibraltarians ==
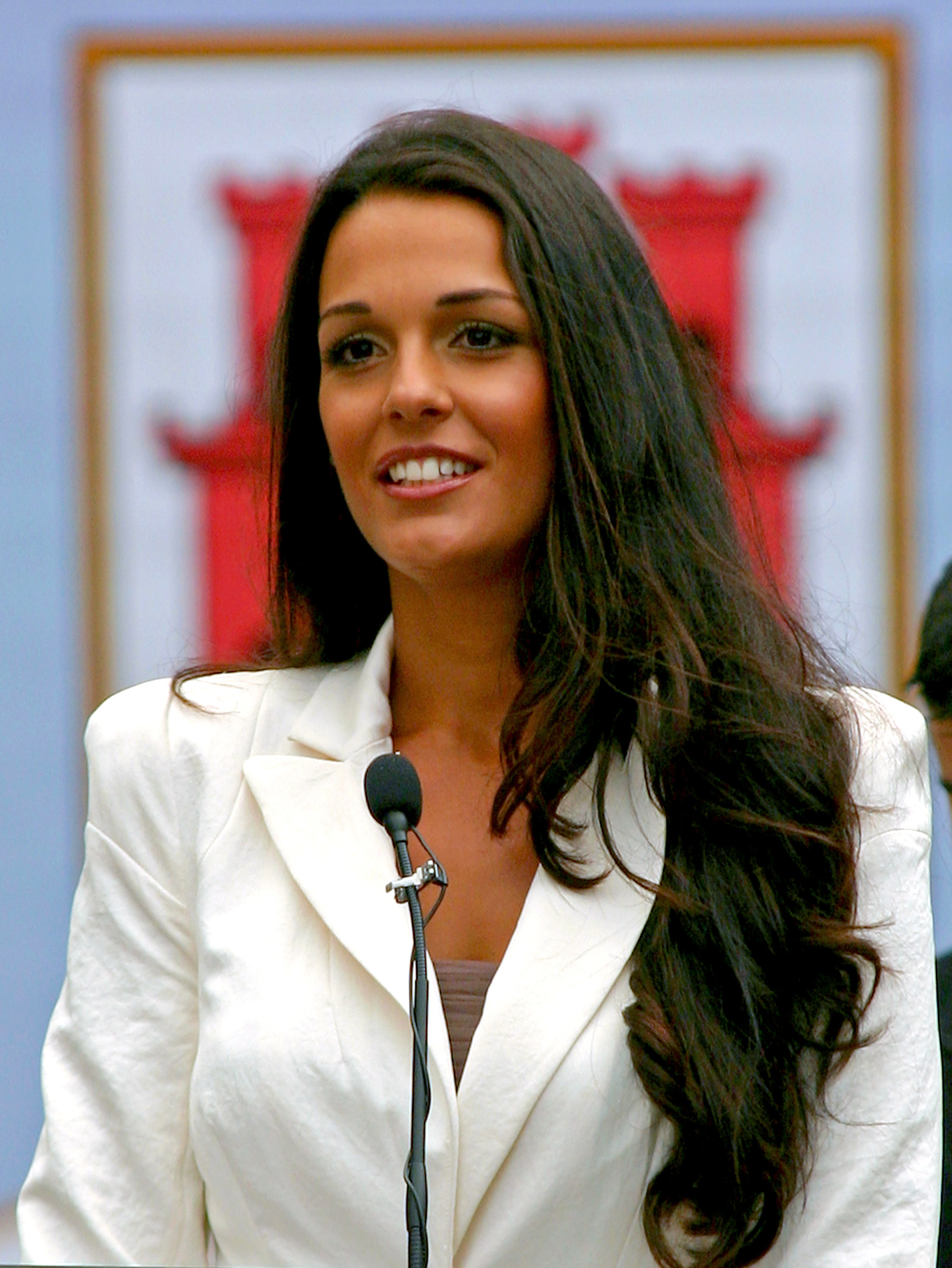
Kaiane Aldorino

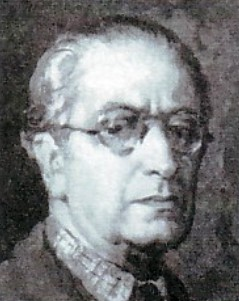
Gustavo Bacarisas

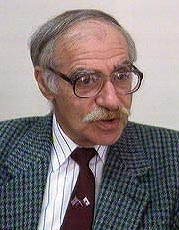
Joe Bossano

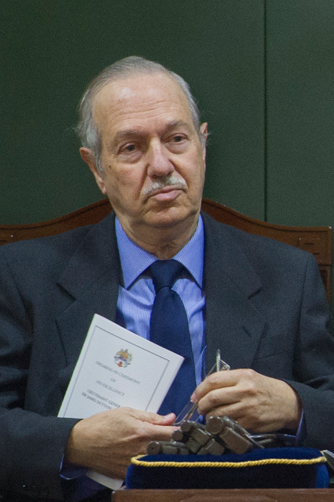
Adolfo Canepa

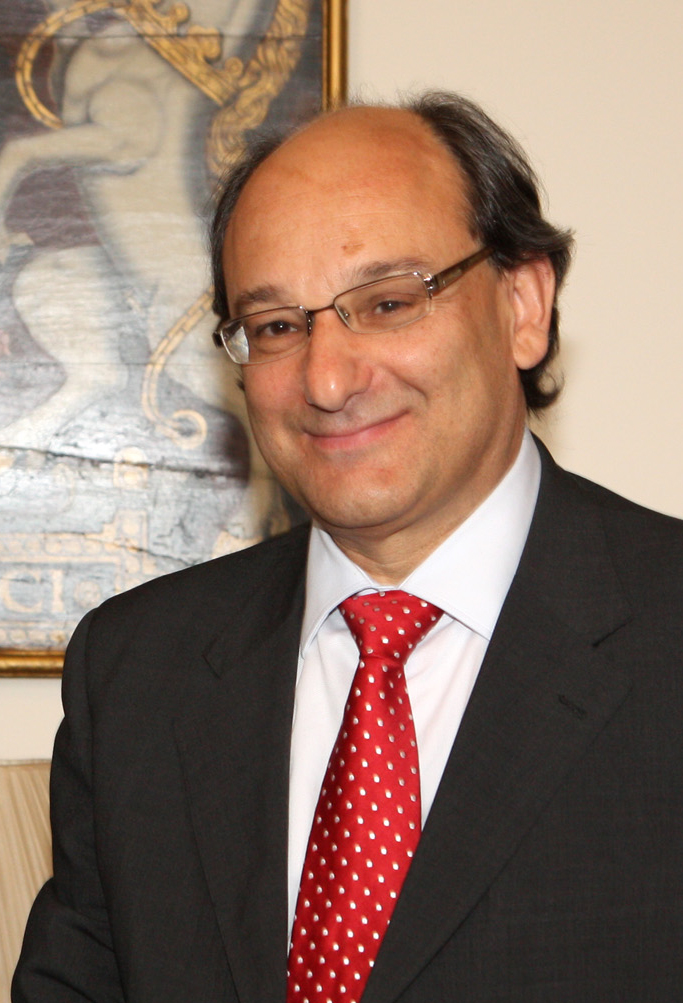
Peter Caruana

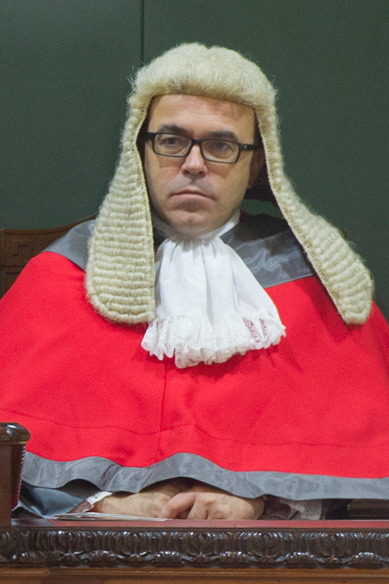
Anthony Dudley

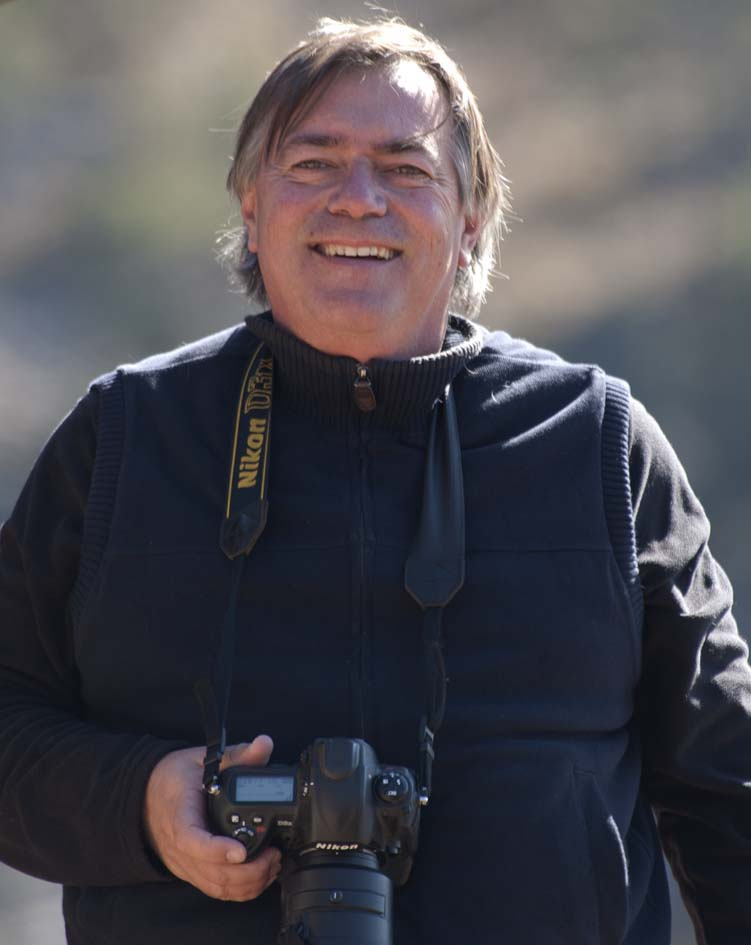
Clive Finlayson

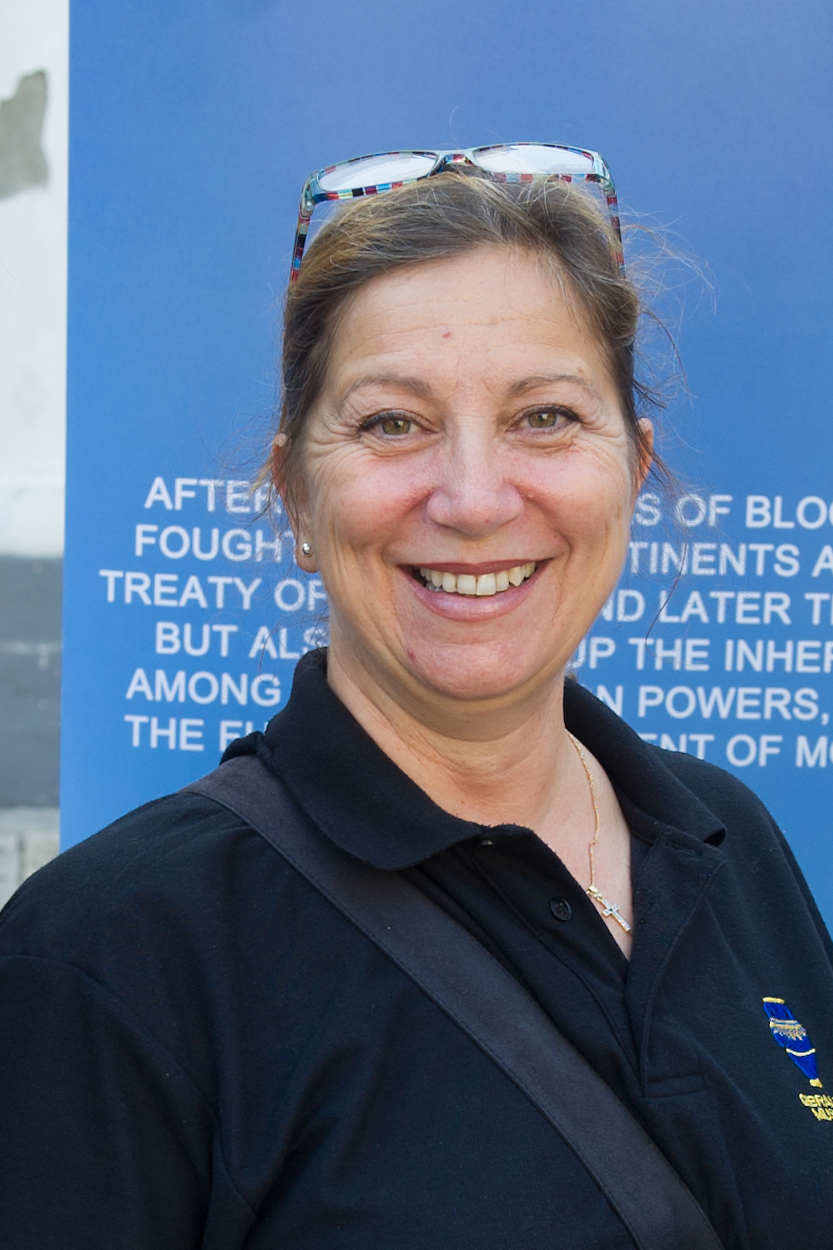
Geraldine Finlayson

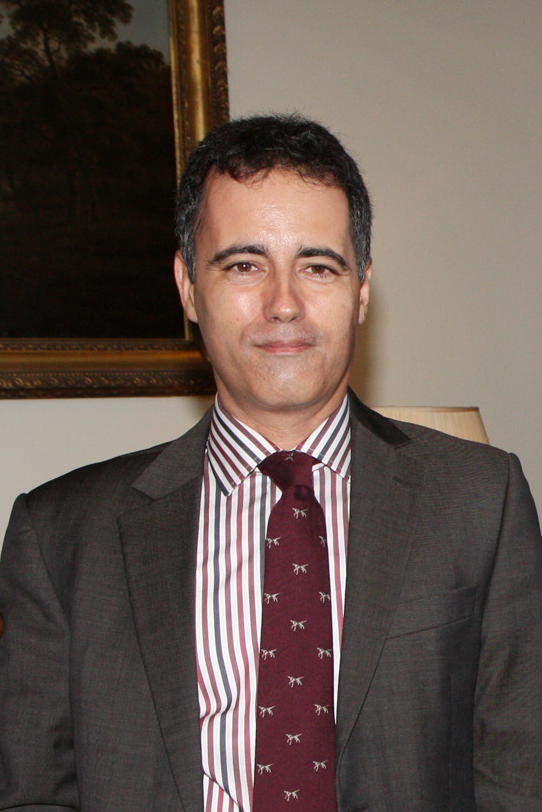
Joseph Garcia

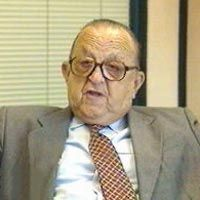
Joshua Hassan

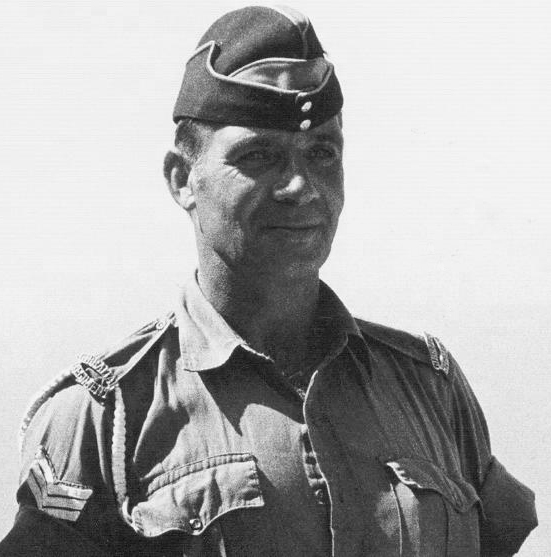
Alfred Holmes

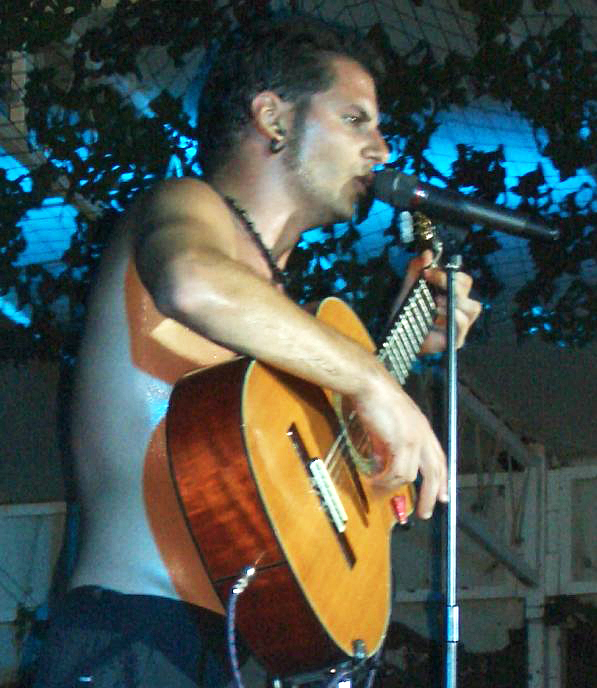
Paul Isola

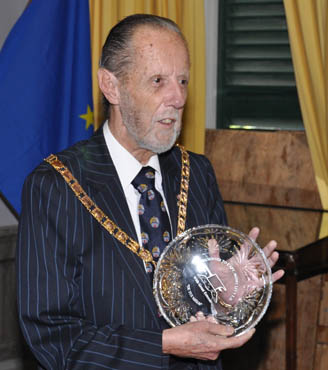
Solomon Levy

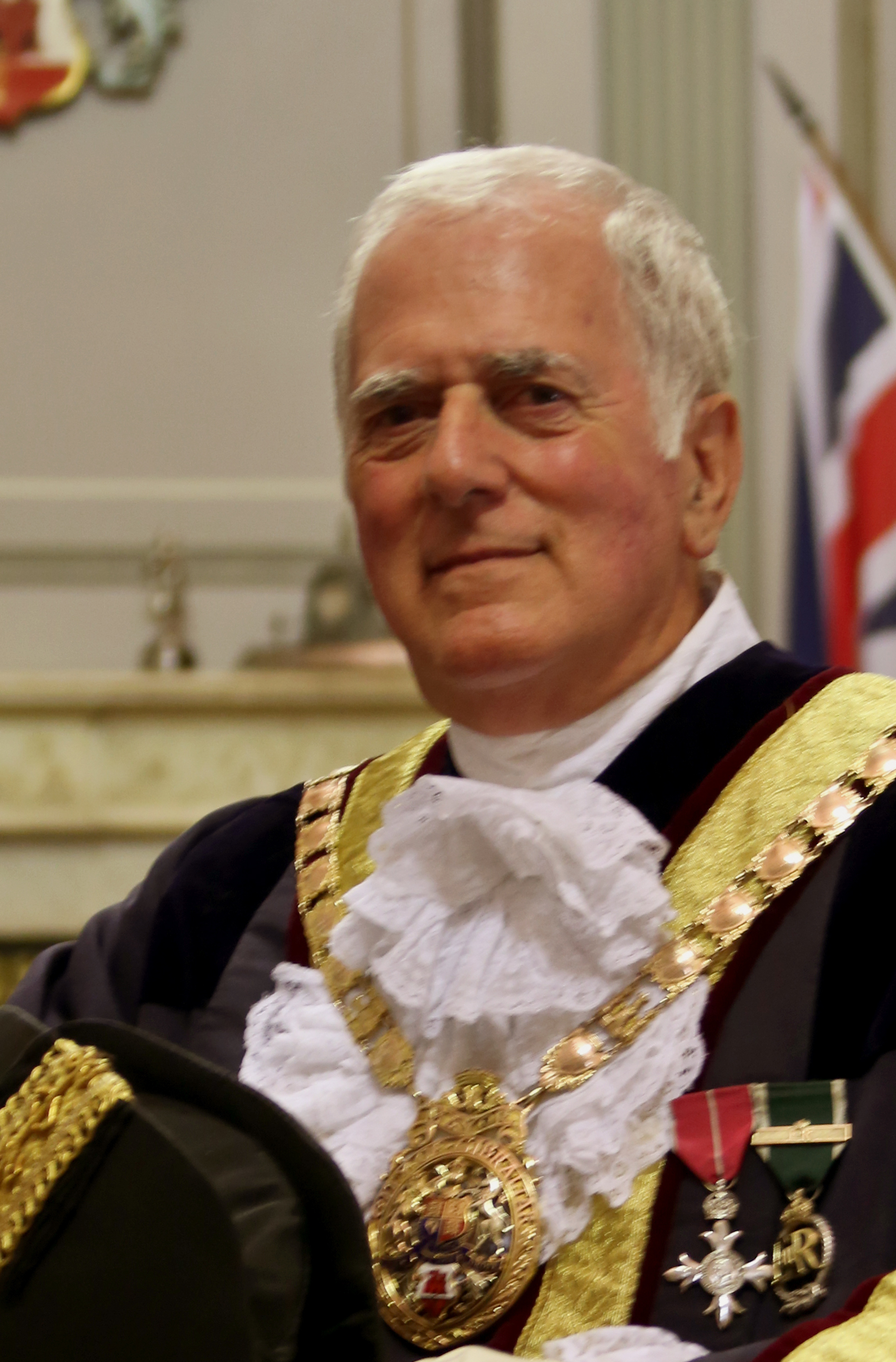
Anthony Lima

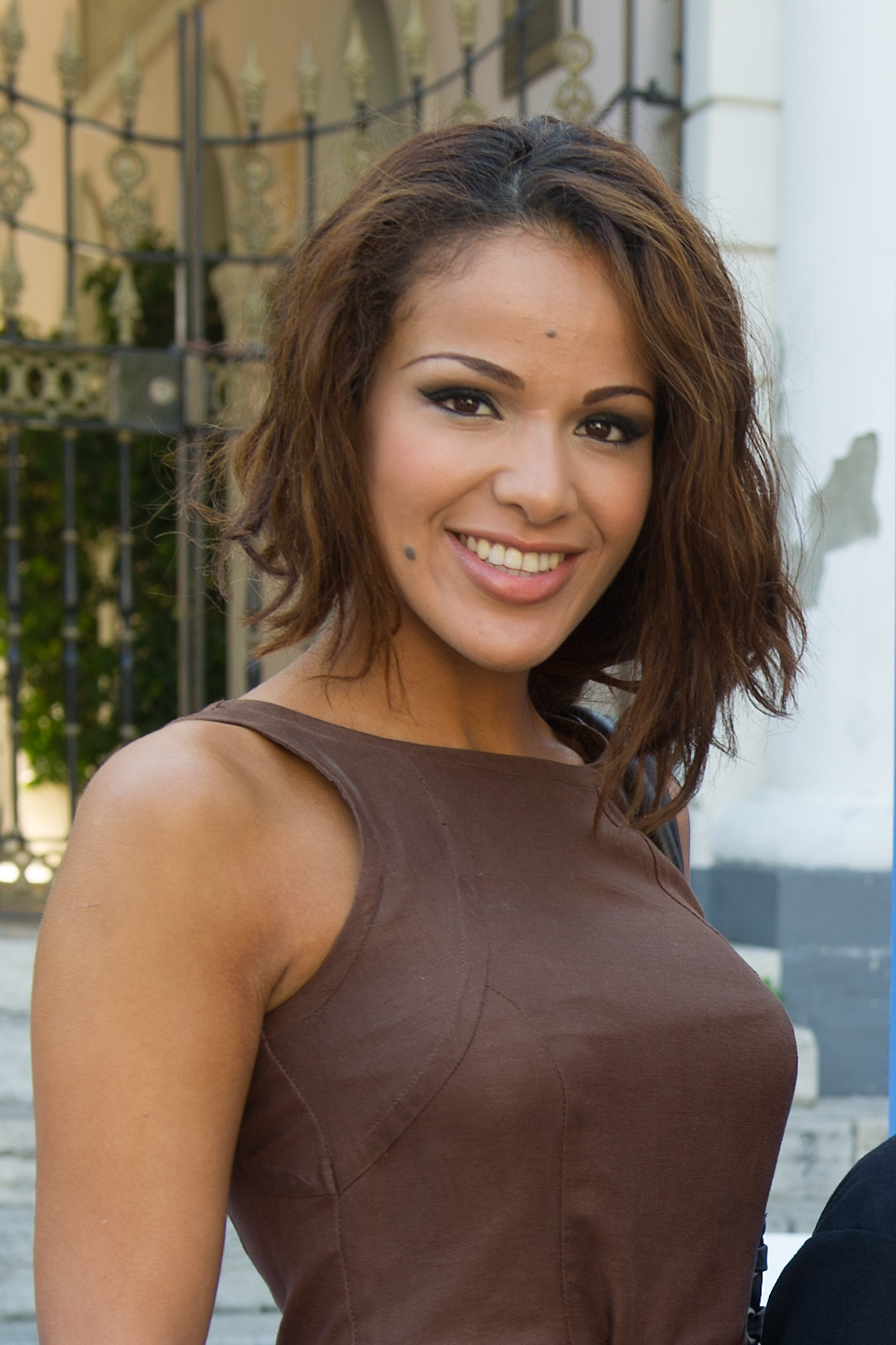
Maroua Kharbouch

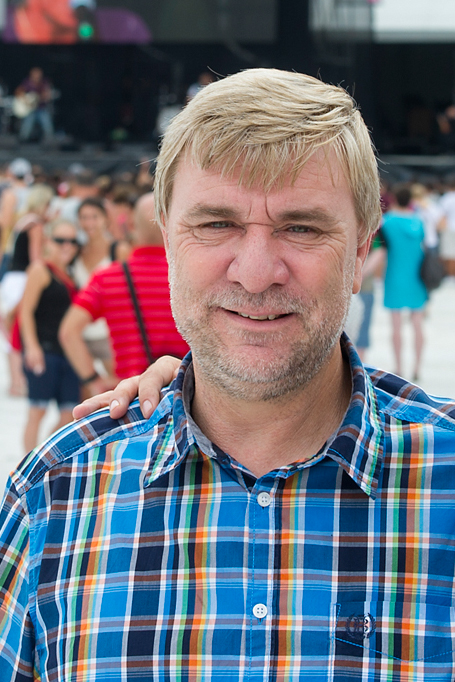
Steven Linares

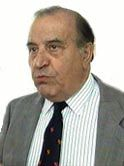
Robert Peliza

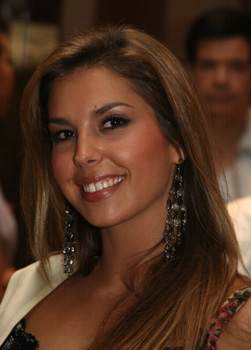
Danielle Perez (beauty pageant winner)

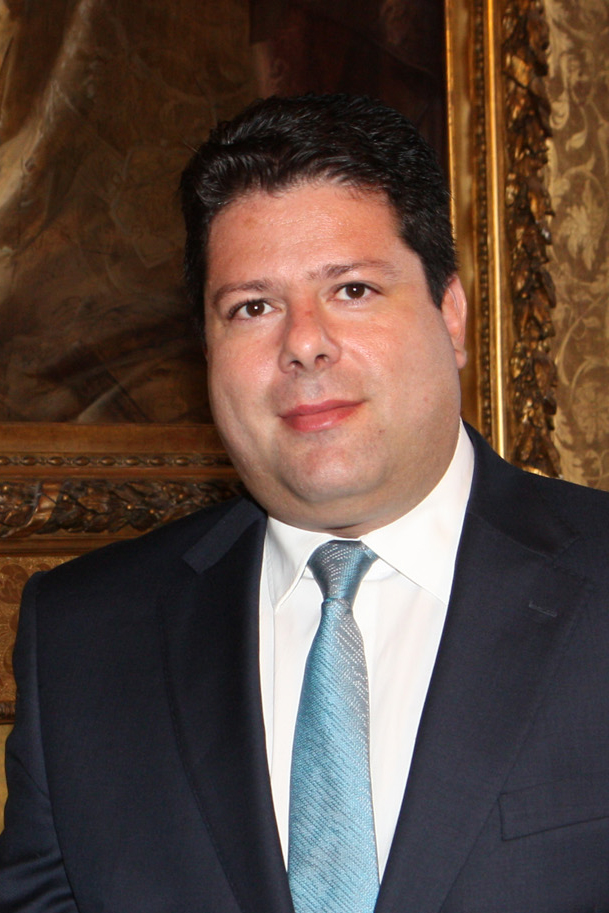
Fabian Picardo

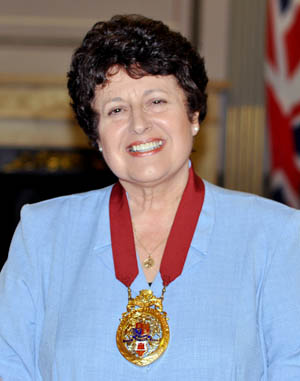
Olga Zammitt

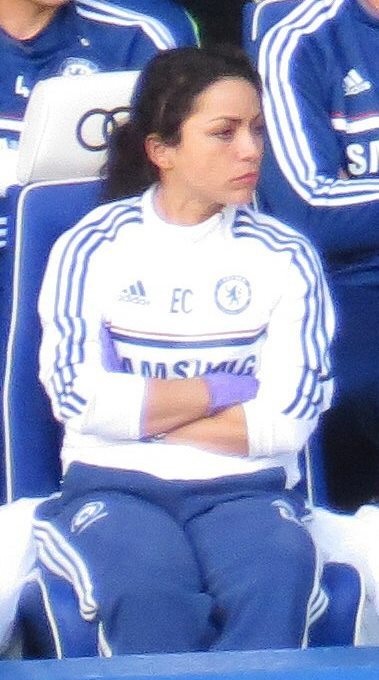
Eva Carneiro

== See also ==
- List of Gibraltarians
- Gibraltarians in the United Kingdom
- History of the Genoese in Gibraltar
- Gibraltarian status
- Demographics of Gibraltar
- History of nationality in Gibraltar
