= Gibraltarian English =

Denotes the accent of English spoken in Gibraltar

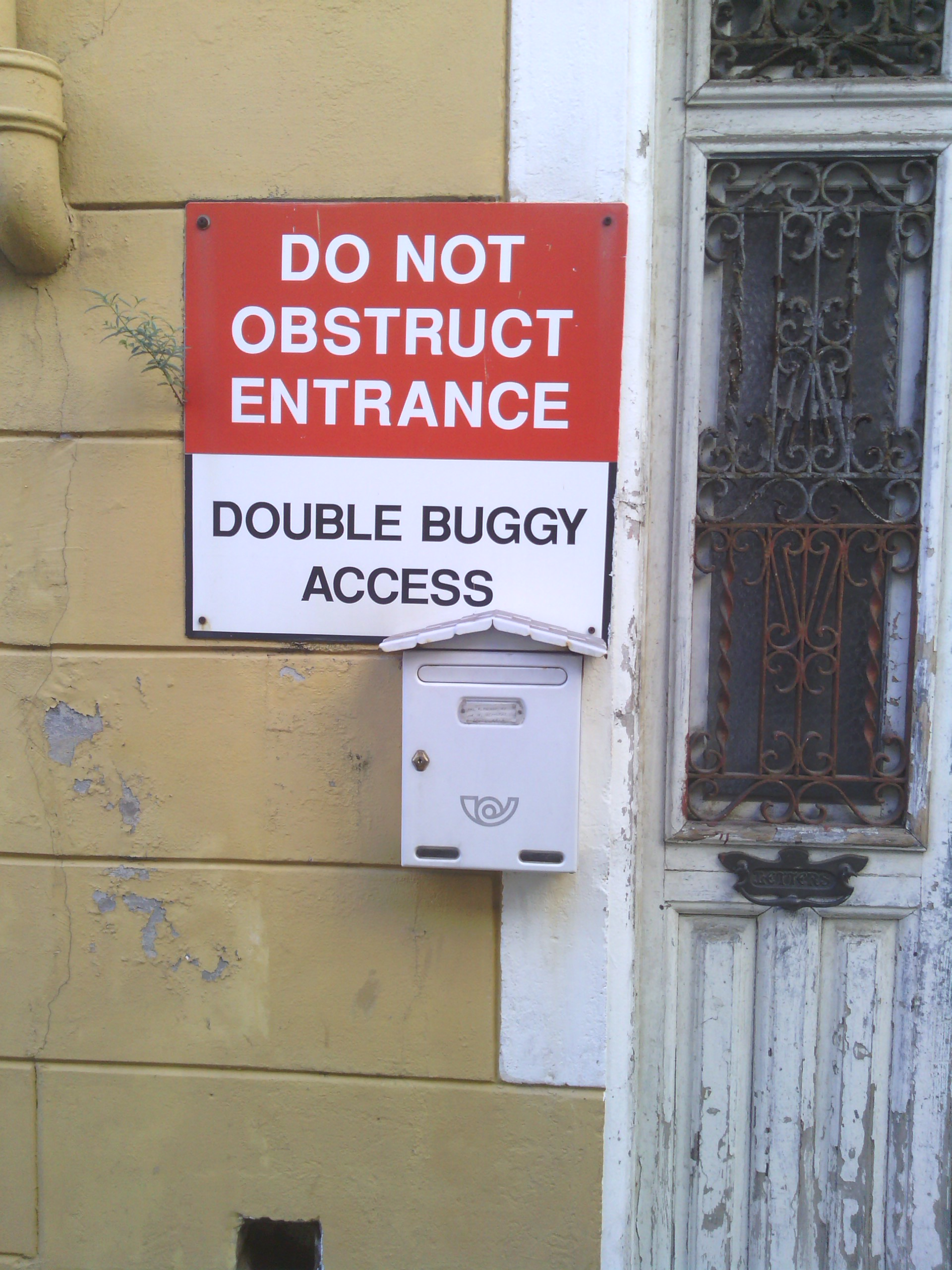
- A sign in Gibraltar
- Native to: United Kingdom
- Region: Gibraltar
- Ethnicity: Gibraltarians
- Language family: Indo-European: Germanic; West Germanic; Ingvaeonic; Anglo-Frisian; Anglic; English; International English; European English; Euro English; British English; Gibraltarian English
- Early forms: Proto-Indo-European: Proto-Germanic; Proto-West Germanic; Proto-English; Old English; Middle English; Early Modern English; Modern English
- Writing system: English alphabet

Language codes
- ISO 639-3: –
- IETF: en-GI
- English is the official language of Gibraltar.

Gibraltarian English (abbreviated GibE) denotes the accent of English spoken in the British Overseas Territory of Gibraltar. The English language has been present at Gibraltar for approximately 300 years, and during these centuries English has mixed with diverse languages, particularly Andalusian Spanish. Gibraltarian English has become a subject of study for linguists interested in how English and other languages mix. While the primary language of Gibraltarians is a variety of Andalusian Spanish called Llanito or Yanito, Gibraltarian English has become more prominent, and there has been a theory proposed that this variety of English is becoming "nativised". Gibraltarian English is similar in many respects to British English, particularly southern varieties.

== See also ==
- Languages of Gibraltar
