= Genoese dialect =

Dialect of Ligurian spoken in Genoa

Genoese
- zeneize (Ligurian)
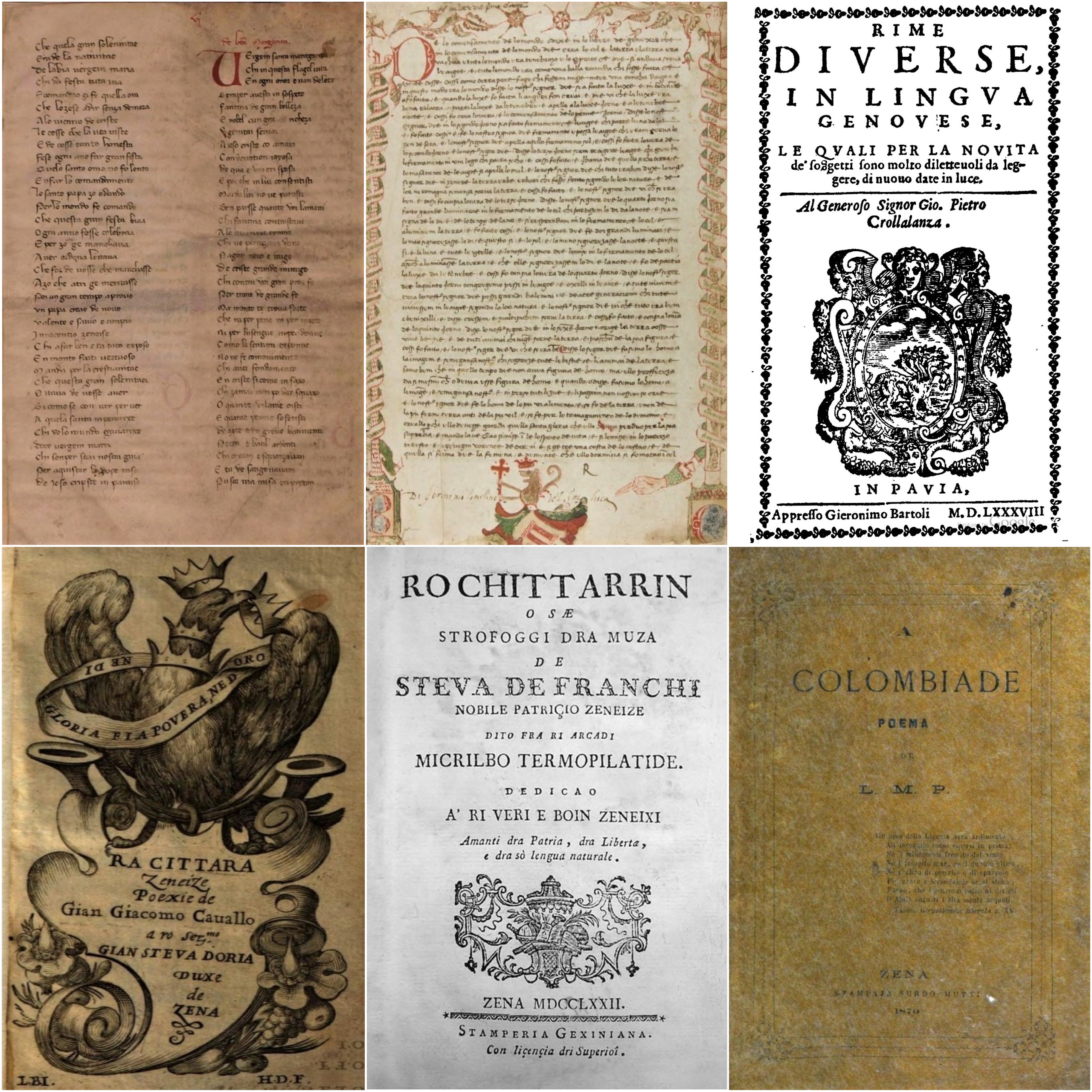
- Literatures in the Genoese dialect
- Pronunciation: [zeˈnejze]
- Native to: Italy
- Region: Liguria
- Language family: Indo-European: Italic; Latino-Faliscan; Romance; Italo-Western; Western; Gallo-Romance; Gallo-Italic; Ligurian; Genoese
- Early forms: Proto-Indo-European: Proto-Italic; Old Latin; Vulgar Latin; Proto-Romance

Language codes
- ISO 639-3: –
- Glottolog: geno1240
- Linguasphere: 51-AAA-ohd
- IETF: lij-u-sd-itge

Genoese, locally called zeneise or zeneize (Ligurian: [zeˈnejze]), is the prestige dialect of Ligurian, spoken in and around the Italian city of Genoa, the capital of Liguria.

A majority of remaining speakers of Genoese are elderly. Several associations are dedicated to keeping the dialect alive, examples of which are A Compagna in Genoa and O Castello in Chiavari. Along with 55 more associations they are part of the Consulta Ligure, the main association for Genoese language, culture, art, and traditions.

Written literature has been produced in Genoese since the 13th century, and the orthography has evolved in-step with the language. There are currently two spelling systems in common use, with varying degrees of standardisation. One, proposed in 2008 by the cultural association A Compagna, attempts to closely match in writing the pronunciation of the now-extinct variant of Genoese which used to be spoken in the Portoria neighbourhood of Genoa. Another spelling system was proposed by a group of writers, journalists and academics by standardising the traditional orthography of 19th- and 20th-century Genoese newspapers. This is the spelling used, amongst others, by the academic world as well as by Il Secolo XIX, the largest print newspaper in the region.

Genoese has had an influence on the Llanito vernacular of Gibraltar.

== Phonology ==
Genoese phonology includes a number of similarities with French, one being the heavily nasalized vowels before nasal consonants (in VN(C) sequences), also occurring when Genoese speakers speak standard Italian. There used to be an alveolar approximant (English-like) /ɹ/ opposed to an alveolar trill /r/ (using the 18th century spelling: caro [ˈkaːɹu] "dear" vs. carro [ˈkaːru] "cart"), but it is no longer heard in the city. It may still survive in some rural areas of Liguria, such as Calizzano and Sassello. By far the most widespread type of /r/ today is the alveolar tap [ɾ] (very similar, or identical, to unstressed Standard Italian /r/). There are several distinctive local accents of Genoese: those of Nervi, Quinto and Quarto to the east of Genoa, Voltri, Pra', Pegli and Sestri to the west. There are also accents of the central Polcevera Valley and Bisagno.

Genoese has eight vowels, twenty consonants, and three semivowels.

Vowels

- /a/ as in barba [ˈbaɾba] ("uncle"; "beard")
- /e/ as in tésta [ˈtesta] ("head")
- /ɛ/ as in ægoa [ˈɛːɡwa] ("water")
- /i/ as in bibin [biˈbiŋ] ("turkey")
- /o/ as in cöse [ˈkoːse] ("what?")
- /ø/ as in anchêu [aŋˈkøː] ("today")
- /u/ as in comme [ˈkumːe] ("how?")
- /y/ as in fugassa [fyˈɡas̺ːa] (focaccia, a kind of Italian bread)

A man speaking Genoese (Zeneize), recorded in Italy

== Orthography ==
- ^ is a circumflex accent placed above a vowel and doubles its length.
- ao is read as the Italian “au” or the genovese “ou” or a long Italian “o”.
- è is read as a brief open e. The symbol æ, made up of vowels a ed e, is read as an open long "e"; in groups ænn-a and æn it is read as an open short “e”.
- e and é are read as a closed short “e”; ê is read as a long closed “e”.
- eu is read as if it were read in French: in eu and éu the sound is short in êu the sound is long.
- j is used infrequently and indicates that i should be heard in words such as: gjêmo (giriamo), mangjâ (mangerà), cacjæ (getterei), lascjâ (lascerà), socjêtæ (società).
- o, ó and ô are read as an Italian u like in the word muso; the length of ô is double the length of o and ó.
- ò and ö are read as o in Italian like in the word cosa; the length of ö is double ò.
- u is read as a French u with the exception in groups qu, òu and ou where the u is read as the u in the Italian word guida.
- ç always has a voiceless sound ([s]) like s in the Italian word sacco.
- Word-final n and groups nn-, n- (written with a hyphen) indicate a velar n ([ŋ], such as the n in the Italian word vengo) and are therefore pronounced nasally. The same goes for when n precedes a consonant (including b and p).
- s followed by a vowel, s followed by a voiceless consonant, and s between vowels is always a voiceless [s], sound like the s in the Italian word sacco. s followed by a voiced consonant becomes voiced [z], as in Italian.
- scc is pronounced [ʃtʃ], like sc of the Italian word scena followed sonorously by c of the Italian word cilindro.
- x is read [ʒ] like the French j (e.g. jambon, jeton, joli).
- z, even when it is doubled as zz, is always pronounced [z] as the s in the Italian word rosa.

== Grammar ==
=== Article ===
Pronoun		Definite	Indefinite
singular	masculine	o/l’	un [iŋ]
singular	feminine	a/l’	unna [ˈinˑa]
plural	masculine	i	-
plural	feminine	e	-

Although the spelling is the same for the article un, the numeral adjective and the pronoun, the pronunciation differs: the article is pronounced [iŋ], while the numeral pronoun and adjective are pronounced [ˈyŋ]. Meanwhile, the feminine indefinite article is unna [(ˈ)inˑa] and the pronoun and numeral adjective uña [ˈyŋˑa].

Orthographic rules

Article		Before consonant	Before vowel
definite	masculine	o nemigo, o pan	l’amigo, l’ase
definite	feminine	a figgetta, a persoña	l’amiga, l’ægua
indefinite	masculine	un giorno, un fræ	un euvo, un anno
indefinite	feminine	unna poexia, unna lettia	unn’atra, unn’oa
plural	masculine	i cavaggëi, i amixi	
plural	feminine	e settemañe, e amighe	

==== Partitive ====
The plural of the articles un, unna, does not exist. Instead, the partitive is used, consisting of the articulated forms of the preposition de, or the adjective doî/doe (alcuni/alcune) “some”:

Genoese		Italian	
Masculine	Feminine	Masculine	Feminine
di òmmi	de euve	dei uomini	delle uova
doî òmmi	doe euve	alcuni uomini	alcune uova

Example:

- accattâ di pesci = comprare dei pesci
- se n’é sentio de belle = se ne sono sentite delle belle
- inte di paixi gh’é ancon a monarchia = in certi paesi c’è ancora la monarchia
- son anæto a-o mercou pe accattâ doe cöse = sono andato al mercato a comprare alcune cose

=== Preposition ===
Combination with articles

Preposition	o		a		l'		i		e	
de	do	[du]	da	[da]	de l’	[de l]	di	[di]	de	[de]
à	a-o	[aw] ~ [ɔw]	a-a	[aː]	à l’	[a l]	a-i	[aj]	a-e	[ae] ~ [ɛː] ~ [aj]
da	da-o	[dɔw]	da-a	[daː]	da l’	[da l]	da-i	[daj]	da-e	[dae]
pe	pe-o	[pɔw]	pe-a	[pjaː]	pe l’	[pe l]	pe-i	[pej]	pe-e	[peː]
con	co-o	[kuː]	co-a	[kwaː]	con l’	[kuŋ l]	co-i	[kwiː]	co-e	[kweː]
in	into	[ˈiŋtu]	inta	[ˈiŋta]	inte l’	[ˈiŋte l]	inti	[ˈiŋti]	inte	[ˈiŋte]
tra	tra o	[tra u]	tra a	[tra a]	tra l’	[tra l]	tra i	[tra i]	tra e	[tra e]
in sce	in sciô	[iŋ ʃuː]	in sciâ	[iŋ ʃaː]	in sce l’	[iŋ ʃe l]	in scî	[iŋ ʃiː]	in scê	[iŋ ʃeː]

The preposition in becomes inte before definite articles, partitive de, demonstrative adjectives, cardinal numerals, indefinites, and interrogatives. For example:

- semmo anæte into bòsco. = siamo andate nel bosco.
- son cheito inte l’ægua. = sono caduto nell’acqua.
- inte di paixi gh’é ancon a monarchia. = in certi paesi c’è ancora la monarchia.
- inte sti caxi, l’é megio no fâ ninte. = in questi casi, è meglio non fare nulla.
- ghe ô conto inte doe poule. = glielo racconto in due parole.
- no stâ à parlâ inte nisciun caxo. = no parlare in nessun caso.
- inte che borsa ti l’æ misso? = in che borsa l’hai messo?

==== Preposition Usage ====
A. Motion from a place

Condition	Preposition	Example	Translation
regular	(de) da	son vegnui (de) da Zena	sono venuti da Genova
from inside to outside	(de) d’in	sciortimmo (de) d’in casa	usciamo di casa
from top to bottom	(de) d’in sce	son cheita (de) d’in sciô teito	sono caduta dal tetto
locative adverbs	(de) de	anemmosene (de) de chì	andiamocene da qui

B. Motion through/ by a place

Condition	Preposition	Example	Translation
regular	da (pe)	passemmo da (pe) Spezza	passiamo da La Spezia
regular	(de) pe	passemmo (de) pe Spezza	passiamo da La Spezia
high up places	(de) d’in sce	passemmo (de) d’in sciô passo da Bocchetta	passiamo dal passo della Bocchetta
through bounded spaces	(de) d’in	semmo passæ (de) d’inta cantiña	siamo passati dalla cantina

C. State in place

Condition	Preposition	Example	Translation
regular	in	son arrestou in scagno	sono restato in ufficio
regular	inte	son arrestou into scuo	sono restato al buio
cities and place names	à	staggo à Saña	sto a Savona
cities and place names	à	staggo à l’Æguasanta	sto all’Acquasanta
cities and place names	in	staggo in Arbâ	sto a Albaro
on surfaces	in sce	ëse in sciô ballou	essere sul ballatoio
on surfaces	in sce	ëse in sciâ töa	essere sul tavolo
above something	de d’ato à	ti â veddi a casa in çimma a-o monte?	la vedi la casa sul monte?
above something	in çimma à	metto l’aradio de d’ato a-a töa	metto la radio sul tavolo

For the complement of state in place with the names of cities, towns and localities, à is generally used, but there are some specific toponyms that require in, in an unpredictable way.

D. Motion towards place

Condition	Preposition	Example	Translation
regular	à	anâ à scheua	andare a scuola
regular	à	anâ à l’estranxeo	andare all’estero
cities and place names	à	anâ à Votri	andare a Voltri
cities and place names	in	anâ in San Pê d’Æña	andare a Sampierdarena
person	da	vaggo da-a Texo	vado da Teresa
person	da	vaggo da mæ moæ	vado da mia madre
regions, areas, streets, etc.	in	anemmo in montagna	andiamo in montagna
regions, areas, streets, etc.	in	anemmo in ciazza	andiamo alla spiaggia
regions, areas, streets, etc.	in	anemmo in Spagna	andiamo in Spagna
regions, areas, streets, etc.	in	anemmo in ciassâ Kennedy	andiamo a piazzale Kennedy

As with the complement of state in place, for the complement of motion in place with names of cities, towns and localities mainly à is used, but there are some specific toponyms that require in, in an unpredictable way.

E. Action through/ between something

Condition	Preposition	Example	Translation
regular	tramezo à	o vento o sciuscia tramezo a-e canne do canniou	il vento soffia tra le canne del canneto
regular	tramezo à	tramezo a-e quattro miage de unna stançia	tra le quattro mura d’una stanza
regular	tra / fra	a stava in sciâ carrega, co-a testa tra e moen	stava sulla sedia, con la testa tra le mani
for a distance	de chì à	de chì à 500 metri, gia in sciâ manciña	tra 500 metri, svolta a sinistra
intermittence between a recurring series	da	da unna poula à l’atra a meistra a stranuava pe caxon de l’allergia	tra una parola e l’altra la maestra starnutiva per via dell’allergia

F. Matter of time

Condition	Preposition	Example	Translation
at a time	à	dozze franchi a-o meise	dodici franchi al mese
at a time	à	a-e 5 da mattin	alle 5 del mattino
for some time	pe	ò dormio pe doî giorni	ho dormito per due giorni
for some time	pe	i mæ figgi vëgnan pe Dënâ	i miei figli verranno per Natale
from a time	da	o ve conosce da ch’o l’ea figgeu	vi conosce da quando era bambino
month and season of a year	in	a l’é nasciua into zenâ do 2000?	è nata nel gennaio del 2000
month and season with uncertain year	de	d’ötunno cazze e feugge	in autunno cadono le foglie
year	de	o libbro o l’é stæto pubricou do 1971	il libro è stato pubblicato nel 1971

G. Object Relation

Condition	Preposition	Example	Translation
indirect object	à	ò domandou à mæ poæ	ho chiesto a mio padre
purpose	à	cöse t’ê bon à fâ?	cosa sei capace a fare?
recipient/ beneficiary	à	beseugna pensâ a-a salute	bisogna pensare alla salute
recipient/ beneficiary	pe	unna lettia pe mi e l’amô pe-a muxica	una lettera per me e l’amore per la musica
object of a search	à pe	son anæta à pe fonzi con mæ barba e i seu amixi	sono andata per funghi con mio zio e i suoi amici
accompanying object, quality, method, or manner	con	mettise à töa con de amighe	mettersi a tavola con delle amiche
accompanying object, quality, method, or manner	con	a dònna co-o cappello neigro	la donna dal cappello nero
accompanying object, quality, method, or manner	con	basta co-a raggia! o se â mangia co-i euggi	basta con la rabbia! se la mangia con gli occhi
connection or comparison	tra / fra	no savieiva cöse çerne tra Zena e Saña	non saprei cosa scegliere tra Genova e Savona
familiarity or intimacy	de tra / de fra	a l’à mogognou quarcösa tra de lê	ha borbottato qualcosa tra sé e sé

=== Pronoun ===
==== Personal Pronoun ====
Number		Nominative	Verbal Pronoun	Accusative	Dative	Reflexive	Possessive
singular	1	mi	-	me			mæ
singular	2	ti	ti	te			teu / tò
singular	3	lê	o (l’) / a (l’)	ô / â / l’	ghe	se	seu / sò
plural	1	n(o)iatri	-	ne			nòstro, nòstra, nòstri, nòstre
plural	2	v(o)iatri	-	ve			vòstro, vòstra, vòstri, vòstre
plural	3	l(o)iatri / lô	i (l’) *	î / ê	ghe	se	seu / sò

General rules:

- Genoese dialect, similar to Italian is a pro-drop language.
- Genoese dialect has no tonic forms (forma tonica), therefore the nominative is used instead.
- The gender of 3rd person singular pronouns are solely distinguished by the verbal pronoun (o/a).
- If the verb succeeding the 3SG verbal pronoun (o/a) starts with a vowel, an extra l’ is added.
- The verbal pronoun ti and all accusative-dative pronouns with the exception of ô/â/î/ê can elide before words starting with a vowel.

Rules regarding 3rd person accusative pronouns:

For the singular, l’ is used before a verb starting with a vowel:

- ghe ô pòrto mi = glielo porto io.
- ghe l’accatto mi = glielo compro io.

If placed after an imperative, gerund, or infinitive verb, the form -lo, -la, -li, -le are used.

- cantilo torna, pe piaxei! = cantalo di nuovo, per favore!
- ti veu accattâtela tutta? = vuoi comprartela tutta?

In some varieties spoken along the Riviera and the Hinterland, the invariable 3PL clitic pronoun i can be found:

- i mæ amixi i l’en za anæti. = i miei amici sono già andati.

Comparison with Italian

Italian		Genoese		Explanation
Pronoun	Example	Pronoun	Example	Explanation
ci	ci ha parlato dei suoi problemi	ne	o n’à parlou di seu problemi	Indirect object
ci	non ci si capisce nulla	ghe	no se gh’accapisce ninte	Demonstrative
ci	abbiamo sbagliato a non andarci!	ghe	emmo fæto mâ à no anâghe!	Locative adverb
ci	arrivederci	se	à reveddise	Reciprocal
ci	ci siamo comprati una televisione nuova	se	se semmo accattæ unna neuva televixon	Enclitic
ci	ci vediamo stasera?	se	se veddemmo staseia?	Pleonastic

Formal Pronoun

Formal pronouns are used to replace 2nd person pronoun to indicate politeness or courtesy. In Genoese there are two forms of polite address, voscià and voî. Both can be used regardless of gender.

Of the two, voscià expresses greater deference and is traditionally used towards people of high social standing. The form voscià is therefore used between people of the same social status, or by people of a lower social status towards people of higher status.

Voî is used between people of medium-low social standing, or by a person of higher social standing towards someone of lower social standing. The form voî, once typical of rural areas, can be seen today as distant or even offensive. It can also be used to deliberately mark a hierarchical distance, revealing a belief of superiority towards the target, denying the use of the more respectful voscià.

- ou, voî, no poei miga intrâ into tiatro vestio à sta mainea! = ehi, lei, non può mica entrare a teatro vestito in questo modo!
- a prescidente a m’à dito ch’a ghe saià... e voscià? = la presidente mi ha detto che ci sarà... e Lei?
- scià l’intre voscià pe-o primmo, sciô Reboa! = entri prima Lei, signor Rebora!
- voscià sci che scià l’é un amigo! = lei sì che è un amico!

==== Demonstrative Pronoun and Adjective ====
Pronoun		Proximal		Distal
Pronoun		Pronoun	Adjective	Pronoun & Adjective
Singular	Masculine	sto chì	(que)sto	quello
Singular	Feminine	sta chì	(que)sta	quella
Plural	Masculine	sti chì	(que)sti	quelli
Plural	Feminine	ste chì	(que)ste	quelle

In Genoese, sto is the most widespread variant both in speech and writing as opposed to questo. It is not to be considered a truncated form of questo, therefore it must be written without an apostrophe.

The Genoese adjective and demonstrative pronoun questo can be emphasized by the adverb chì. Similarly, the form sto allows for such strengthening, and requires it when it performs a pronominal function. Likewise, in Genoese the adjective and demonstrative pronoun quello can be emphasized by the adverbs lì and là.

1. (chì) near the speaker

- ma sta chì a l’é unn’atra stöia = ma questa qui è un’altra storia
- a l’é sta chì, ciù che tutto, a vea raxon = è questa, soprattutto, la vera ragione

2. (lì) further away from the speaker, often near the listener

- na, damme quello lie, vexin a-a bottiggia = no, dammi quello lì, vicino alla bottiglia

3. (là) even further away from the speaker and the listener

- quello là o l’é delongo o primmo à lagnâse = quello là è sempre il primo a lamentarsi

==== Locative ====
ghe

- gh’é stæto un ch’o m’à saluou pe-a stradda = c’è uno che mi ha salutato per strada
- gh’é sciuscianta menuti inte unn’oa - ci sono sessanta minuti in un’ora
- gh’ea tanta neive pe-e stradde da çittæ = c’era molta neve per le strade della città
- no gh’é nisciun ch’o l’agge visto = non c’è persona che l’abbia visto
- lì no ghe n’ea, ma chì ghe n’é ben ben = lì non ce n’era, ma qui ce n’è tanto
- inte sta stöia gh’é unn’eröiña = in questa storia c’è un’eroina
- inte doî euro gh’é duxento citti = in due euro ci sono duecento centesimi

==== Partitive ====
ne

- me n’indubito = ne dubito
- no ne sò ninte = non ne so nulla
- cöse ne pensæ? = che ne pensate?
- mi no ne veuggio manco = nemmeno io ne voglio
- basta, oua me ne vaggo! = basta, ora me ne vado!
- ò cattou de çexe, ti ne veu? = ho comprato delle ciliegie, ne vuoi?

Some Genoese verbs require the use of ne compared to Italian:

- no ne veuggio ciù savei de ti! = non voglio più saperne di te!
- de dond’o ne vëgne quello son? = da dove viene quel rumore?
- sto formaggio o ne sa de moffa. = questo formaggio sa di muffa.
- cöse ne pensæ viatre de sta deçixon? = cosa pensate voi di questa decisione?

==== Relative ====
Condition	Preposition	Example	Translation
as a subject	che	a casa ch’a l’é deruâ a l’ea ben ben antiga	la casa che è crollata era molto antica
as an object complement	che	o scignoro che t’æ saluou o l’é seu barba	il signore che hai salutato è suo zio
prepositional	quæ	a l’à visto l’amiga co-a quæ a s’ea confiâ	ha visto l’amica con la quale si era confidata
"of which"	de che	quelli son i figgeu de che te diva	quelli sono i ragazzi che ti dicevo
"to the extent which"	quello che	gh’ò dito quello che doveiva dîghe	gli ho detto quanto necessario
"colui il quale"	chi	chi veu piggiâ parte ch’o tie sciù a man!	chi vuole partecipare alzi la mano!
"anyone which"	chi	regallilo à chi ti veu, à mi o no m’interessa	regalalo a chi vuoi, a me non interessa
"someone which"	de quelli che	gh’é de quelli che travaggian de sabbo ascì	c’è chi lavora anche il sabato

The pronoun chi (for subject relative pronoun) as opposed to che, today relegated only to certain literary uses, is always followed by a singular verb without pronominal resumption: "o menestron chi bogge, i figgeu chi zeuga" but "o menestron ch’o bogge, i figgeu che zeugan"

== Tongue twisters ==
- Mi sò assæ se a sâ a saa assæ pe saâ a säçissa. (Ligurian pronunciation: [ˈmi ˈsɔ aˈsɛː se a ˈsaː a saˈa aˈsɛː pe saˈaː a saːˈsisˑa]) = I don't have a clue whether the salt is going to be enough to salt the sausage (salsiccia).
- Sciâ scîe scignôa, sciando Sciâ xêua in scî scî. = Ski, madam, skying you fly on skis.
- A-o mêu nêuo gh'é nêue nâe nêue; a ciù nêua de nêue nâe nêue a n'êu anâ. = At the new pier there are nine new ships; the newest of the nine new ships doesn't want to go.
- Gi'àngiai g'han gi'oggi gi'uegge gi'unge cume gi'atri? = Do angels have eyes, ears, and (finger)nails like everyone else? (variant of the Cogorno comune)

== Expressions ==
- Son zeneize, rîzo ræo, strénzo i dénti e parlo ciæo. = "I'm Genoese, I seldom laugh, I grind my teeth, and I say what I mean" (literally, "speak clearly").
- The child complains: Ò famme. = I'm hungry. The mother answers: Gràttite e zenogge e fatte e lasagne. = Scratch your knees and make lasagna.
- Chi vêu vîve da bon crestiàn, da-i begghìn o stagghe lontàn. = "If you want to live as a good Christian, stay away from those who pretend to be devout" (a traditional warning to beware of fanatics and hypocrites).
- Sciusciâ e sciorbî no se peu. = You can't have or do two contradicting things at the same time (literally, "you can't inhale and exhale").
- Belìn! = Wow! or Damn! (very informal) (literally the word means "penis", but it lost its obscene meaning and is currently used as an intensifier in a lot of different expressions, acting almost as an equivalent of the English "Fuck!" or "Fuck it!").

== Songs ==
One of the most famous folk songs written in the Genoese dialect is called Ma se ghe penso (or Ma se ghe pensu) written by Mario Cappello.

Towards the end of the 20th century, artist Fabrizio De André wrote an entire album called Crêuza de mä in the Genoese dialect.

Currently, young singers and songwriters from Liguria compose and sing songs in Genoese like Buio Pesto and Max Turigìn.
