= Llanito =

Spanish variety spoken in Gibraltar

- Yanito, Gibraltarian Spanish
- Pronunciation: Spanish: [ɟʝaˈnito]
- Native to: Gibraltar
- Ethnicity: Gibraltarians
- Language family: Indo-European: Italic; Latino-Faliscan; Latin; Romance; Italo-Western; Western; Iberian; West Iberian; Castilian; Spanish; Peninsular Spanish; Andalusian Spanish; Llanito
- Early forms: Old Latin: Vulgar Latin; Proto-Romance; Old Spanish; Early Modern Spanish
- Writing system: Latin

Language codes
- ISO 639-3: –
- IETF: es-GI-spanglis
- The majority of Gibraltar's population speaks Llanito.

Llanito or Yanito (Spanish pronunciation: [ɟʝaˈnito]) is a form of Andalusian Spanish heavily laced with words from English and other languages, such as Ligurian; it is spoken in the British overseas territory of Gibraltar. It is commonly marked by a great deal of code switching between Andalusian Spanish and British English and by the use of Anglicisms and loanwords from other Mediterranean languages and dialects.

Llanito has been described as "Gibraltar's dying mother-tongue". The English language is becoming increasingly dominant in Gibraltar, with the younger generation speaking little or no Llanito despite learning Spanish in school. Llanito is a Spanish word meaning 'little plain'. Gibraltarians also call themselves Llanitos.

== Etymology ==
The etymology of the term Llanito is uncertain, and there are a number of theories about its origin. In Spanish, llanito means 'little flatland' and one interpretation is that it refers to the "people of the flatlands". It is thought that the inhabitants of La Línea with important social and economic ties with Gibraltar, were actually the first to be referred to as Llanitos since La Línea lies in the plain and marsh land surrounding The Rock.

Another theory for the origin of the word is that it is a diminutive of the name Gianni: gianito, pronounced in Genoese slang with the /g/ as /j/. During the late 18th century 34% of the male civilian population of Gibraltar came from Genoa and Gianni was a common Italian forename. To this day, nearly 20% of Gibraltarian surnames are Italian in origin. It has also been speculated that the term comes from the English name Johnny.

It has also been hypothesized that the term originated as a reference to the language of the people, with llanito originally referring to the "plain language" spoken by ordinary Gibraltarians.

== History ==
The most influential periods for the formation of Llanito are:

- 1713. The Treaty of Utrecht yields Gibraltar to the Kingdom of Great Britain.
- After the Spanish War of Independence and the Peninsular War, British authorities form an education system of British inspiration.
- During the evacuation of Gibraltar within the Second World War, the authorities realise that most of the Gibraltarians lack a sufficient command of English. Subsequently, Spanish is relegated to a foreign language subject in the education system.
- 1969–1982. Spanish governments close "the fence" (the land border) and Spanish workers cannot cross the border into Gibraltar. This reduced the need for Spanish in the workplace and the input of Spanish nannies.

== Language ==
Andalusian Spanish, from the surrounding Campo de Gibraltar, is the main constituent of Llanito. However, Llanito is also heavily influenced by British English. Furthermore, it has borrowed words and expressions from many other languages: for example, it contains over 500 words from the medieval Genoese dialect of Ligurian, as well as some words of Hebrew origin via Judaeo-Spanish. Its other main language constituents are Maltese, Portuguese, Menorcan Catalan and Darija Arabic. Caló borrowings were once present but have since been lost.

Llanito often involves code-switching (using different languages for different sentences) and code mixing (using different languages for different words in the same sentence) from Spanish to English. Some Llanito words are also widely used in the neighbouring Spanish town of La Línea de la Concepción (due to the influx of people from La Línea working in Gibraltar over many years).

It has no official orthography.

One feature of the language is the pronunciation of Anglicisms with an Andalusian flavour. For example, bacon is pronounced beki, cake is pronounced keki (although these particular words are not prevalent today), and porridge is called quecaró (a hispanicisation of the brand Quaker Oats). Most Gibraltarians, especially those with higher education, also speak standard Spanish with Andalusian pronunciations and standard English of a British English variety.

Like other Andalusian varieties, Llanito is marked by high rates of final /n/ velarisation, neutralisation and elision of pre-consonantal and word-final /l/ and /r/, and reduction of final /s/. One difference from surrounding dialects is that Gibraltarians tend to maintain this high rate of reduction of final consonants even in very elevated registers, whereas Andalusians would try to adopt a more neutral pronunciation. Llanito has undergone some degree of lexical restructuring as a result of its reduction of final consonants and the unofficial status of Spanish. For example, túnel 'tunnel' is often pronounced [ˈtune], and its plural form may be pronounced as [ˈtune(h)] instead of [ˈtunele(h)].

According to Italian scholar Giulio Vignoli, Llanito originally contained many Genoese words, which were later replaced by mainly Spanish and some English words.

Llanito has significant Jewish influence, because of a long-standing Jewish population in Gibraltar. They introduced words and expressions from Haketia, a largely extinct Judeo-Spanish language spoken by the Sephardic communities of Northern Morocco such as in Tetuan and Tangiers, and the Spanish exclaves of Ceuta and Melilla in North Africa.

Although Llanito is seldom written, a Llanito dictionary, Diccionario Yanito, was published in 1978 by Manuel Cavilla. In 2001, Tito Vallejo published The Yanito Dictionary. Including Place Names and Yanito Anecdotes.

== Core elements of Llanito vocabulary ==
Although Llanito is largely based on the colloquial Spanish spoken in the Campo de Gibraltar, there are numerous elements beyond code-switching to English which make it unique. These are as follows.

=== Anglicisms ===
They may be false friends or involve an informal playfulness.

- Echegarai: 'watchman' or 'guard'. From English Check Gate influenced by the Basque surname Echegaray.
- Focona: Gibraltar border with Spain. From English Four Corners.
- darle una apología: 'to give him an apology' instead of pedirle perdón. In standard Spanish, apología is a 'defence speech'.

=== Calques from English to Spanish ===
Llanito frequently uses verbal expressions with para atrás, or p'atrás, mirroring use of English phrasal verbs ending in "back". These expressions are meaningless in standard Spanish.

- Te llamo p'atrás: Literal translation into Spanish of English phrase 'I'll call you back'. In standard Spanish, one would normally say 'I'll return your call' (Te devuelvo la llamada, Te devolveré la llamada).
- dar p'atrás: 'To give back'.
- venir p'atrás: 'To come back'.
- hablar p'atrás: 'To talk back'.
- pagar p'atrás: 'To pay back'.

Usage of p'atrás expressions is also widespread in US Spanish, including in Isleño Spanish. P'atrás expressions are unique as a calque of an English verbal particle, since other phrasal verbs are almost never calqued into Spanish. Because of this, and because p'atrás expressions are both consistent with Spanish structure and distinctly structured to their English equivalents, they are likely a result of a conceptual, not linguistic loan.

The word liqueribá in Llanito means regaliz ('liquorice') in Spanish, stemming from the English liquorice bar.

=== Calques from Spanish to English ===
- Don't give me the tin: Literal translation of Spanish expression No me des la lata, meaning 'stop annoying me'.
- What a cachonfinger!: This is a humorous expression based on the Spanish word cachondeo which means piss-take in British English. The end of the word, deo, is how the word dedo ('finger') is pronounced in colloquial Andalusian Spanish, thus cachonfinger.

=== Local expressions ===
- ¿Tú quién te crees que eres? ¿El hijo del Melbil? Literally, Who do you think you are? The son of the Melbil?, as used when someone is acting with excessive self-importance. Melbil is a Spanish approximation of the pronunciation of the British name Melville, and the expression is an allusion to Lord Melville, a British statesman prominent in the early 19th-century. The elder Lord Melville was Secretary at War (1794–1801), and First Lord of the Admiralty (1804–1805); his son, the younger Lord Melville, later became First Lord of the Admiralty (1812-1827).

== Linguistic research ==
Laura Wright, an English professor at the University of Cambridge, and Sophie Macdonald, a Gibraltarian undergraduate she was supervising, began researching the language in 2022. Wright sought a research grant from the Gibraltarian government without success, but induced a minister to put saving Llanito into his election manifesto. She is assisted by local writer M. G. Sanchez.

== Broadcasting ==
The Gibraltar Broadcasting Corporation has broadcast some programmes in Llanito, including Talk About Town, a discussion series in which three presenters discuss local affairs, from the need to replace a street sign to important political affairs. Pepe's Pot was a cookery programme which also used Llanito.

== Film ==
A documentary film, People of the Rock: The Llanitos of Gibraltar (2011), discusses Llanito speech characteristics, history and culture. Notable interviews include Pepe Palmero (of GBC's Pepe's Pot), Kaiane Aldorino (Miss World 2009), and Tito Vallejo (author of The Llanito Dictionary).

== See also ==
- Diglossia
- Languages of Gibraltar
- Languages of the United Kingdom
- Spanglish

== Sources ==
- Archer, Edward G. (2006). "Language and the community". Gibraltar, identity and empire. London: Routledge. pp. 107–114. ISBN 9780415347969.
- Eberhard, David M.; Simons, Gary F.; Fennig, Charles D. (2020). Ethnologue: Languages of the World (23rd ed.). Dallas, Texas: SIL International.
- Kellermann, Anja (8 March 2001). A New New English: Language, Politics, and Identity in Gibraltar. BoD – Books on Demand. ISBN 9783831123681 – via Google Books.
- Levey, David (2008). Language Change and Variation in Gibraltar. John Benjamins Publishing. ISBN 978-90-272-9159-2.
- Lipski, John M. (2008). Varieties of Spanish in the United States. Washington, D.C.: Georgetown University Press. ISBN 9781589012134.
- Otheguy, Ricardo (31 January 1993). "A reconsideration of the notion of loan translation in the analysis of U.S. Spanish". In Roca, Ana; Lipski, John M. (eds.). Spanish in the United States. Studies in Anthropological Linguistics. pp. 21–46. doi:10.1515/9783110804973.21. ISBN 9783110804973.
- Vázquez Amador, María (2018). "Introducción al yanito de Gibraltar" [Introduction to Gibraltarian Yanito] (PDF). E-Aesla (in European Spanish) (4). Centro Virtual Cervantes: 326. ISSN 2444-197X.
