= Maroua Kharbouch =

Gibraltarian model and beauty pageant titleholder

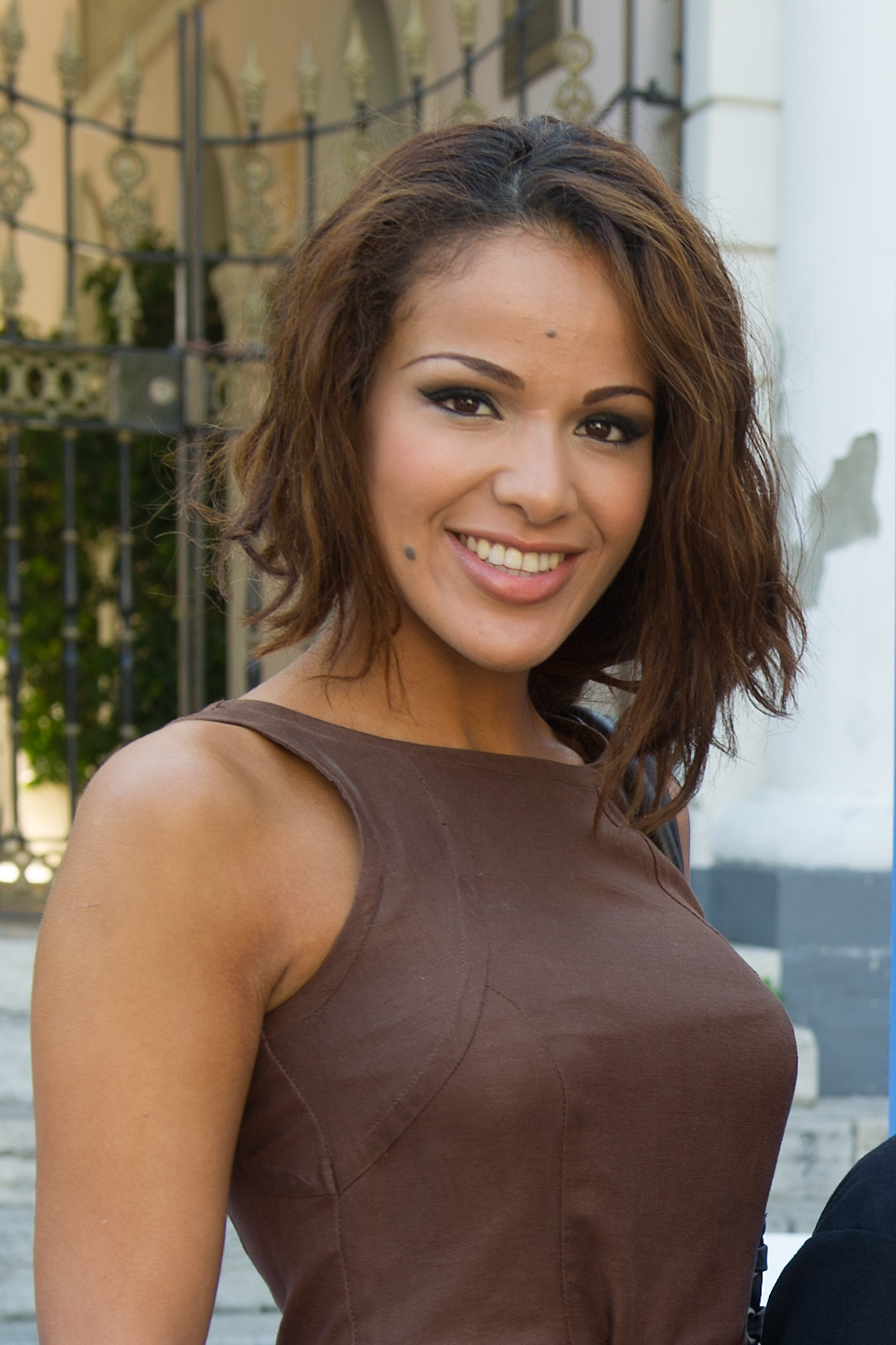
- Maroua Kharbouch at John Mackintosh Square during the tercentenary commemoration of the Treaty of Utrecht, 13 July 2013
- Born: Maroua Kharbouch; 20 September 1990 (age 36); Gibraltar
- Height: 5 ft 8 in (1.73 m)
- Beauty pageant titleholder
- Title: Miss Gibraltar 2013
- Hair color: Brown
- Eye color: Brown
- Major competitions: Miss Gibraltar 2013 (Winner); Miss World 2013 (Top 6) (People's Choice Winner)

Maroua Kharbouch (born 20 September 1990) is a Gibraltarian model and beauty pageant titleholder who was crowned Miss Gibraltar 2013 and was named as the people's choice at Miss World 2013 in Bali, Indonesia where Megan Young of the Philippines won the pageant, earning her a place in the Top 6 finalists. She was the first Gibraltarian of Moroccan descent to be crowned Miss Gibraltar and the second Gibraltarian finalist at a Miss World beauty pageant. She achieved Gibraltar's highest placement since Kaiane Aldorino won in 2009.

== Personal life ==
Maroua Kharbouch is a client relationship manager assistant. Her hobbies and interests include modelling, fitness and volunteering. She is of Moroccan descent with both her parents being from Morocco and is trilingual, speaking English, Spanish and Arabic.

== Miss Gibraltar 2013 ==
Seven contestants signed up to compete at the 2013 Miss Gibraltar beauty pageant. Maroua Kharbouch was BetVictor's favourite to win Miss Gibraltar with the bookie offering odds of 8/13. As all seven contestants chose their order of appearance for the upcoming pageant at random, in the presence of Mayor of Gibraltar Anthony Lima at the City Hall, Kharbouch selected number one.

At 22 years of age, Maroua Kharbouch was crowned Miss Gibraltar 2013 at the 51st edition of the pageant, held at the John Mackintosh Hall on 8 June 2013. She received part of her prize in the form of a cheque and clothing allowance from the Minister for Culture Steven Linares, at a ceremony held at the City Hall on 25 June 2013.

== Miss World 2013 ==
Having been crowned Miss Gibraltar 2013, Maroua Kharbouch would automatically represent Gibraltar at the 2013 Miss World pageant in Bali, Indonesia. By 12 September 2013, Kharbouch was ranked third in Miss World's People's Choice Award, which would gain the award holder automatic entry into the Miss World final. Votes were cast by the general public via the official Miss World mobile app which was available for Apple and Android with proceeds going to charity. Kharbouch was leading the voting by 18 September 2013, a position which she maintained by 26 September 2013. She eventually won the award at the Miss World final two days later which saw her fast-tracked to the Top 6 finalists but fell short of the Top 3 positions. She became only the second Miss Gibraltar to make the semi-final cut at Miss World ever, and the second to make the Top 6.

Kharbouch held hands with her Spanish counterpart Elena Ibarbia, who also made it to the Top 6, as they anticipated the final results. This was seen as an important gesture which contrasted with the political tensions between both countries. Chief Minister of Gibraltar Fabian Picardo described the image as "moving", stating that they were an example of

"the reality of the symbiotic relationship between the people of Gibraltar and the Spanish people of La Linea and the towns around us. Friendship. Respect. Understanding."

Maroua Kharbouch returned to Gibraltar on 30 September 2013 when she was greeted by Minister Steven Linares and Mayor Anthony Lima at Gibraltar International Airport.

| Preceded by Jessica Baldachino | Miss Gibraltar; 2013 | Succeeded by Shyanne Azzopardi |
