= Gibraltar Hindu Temple =

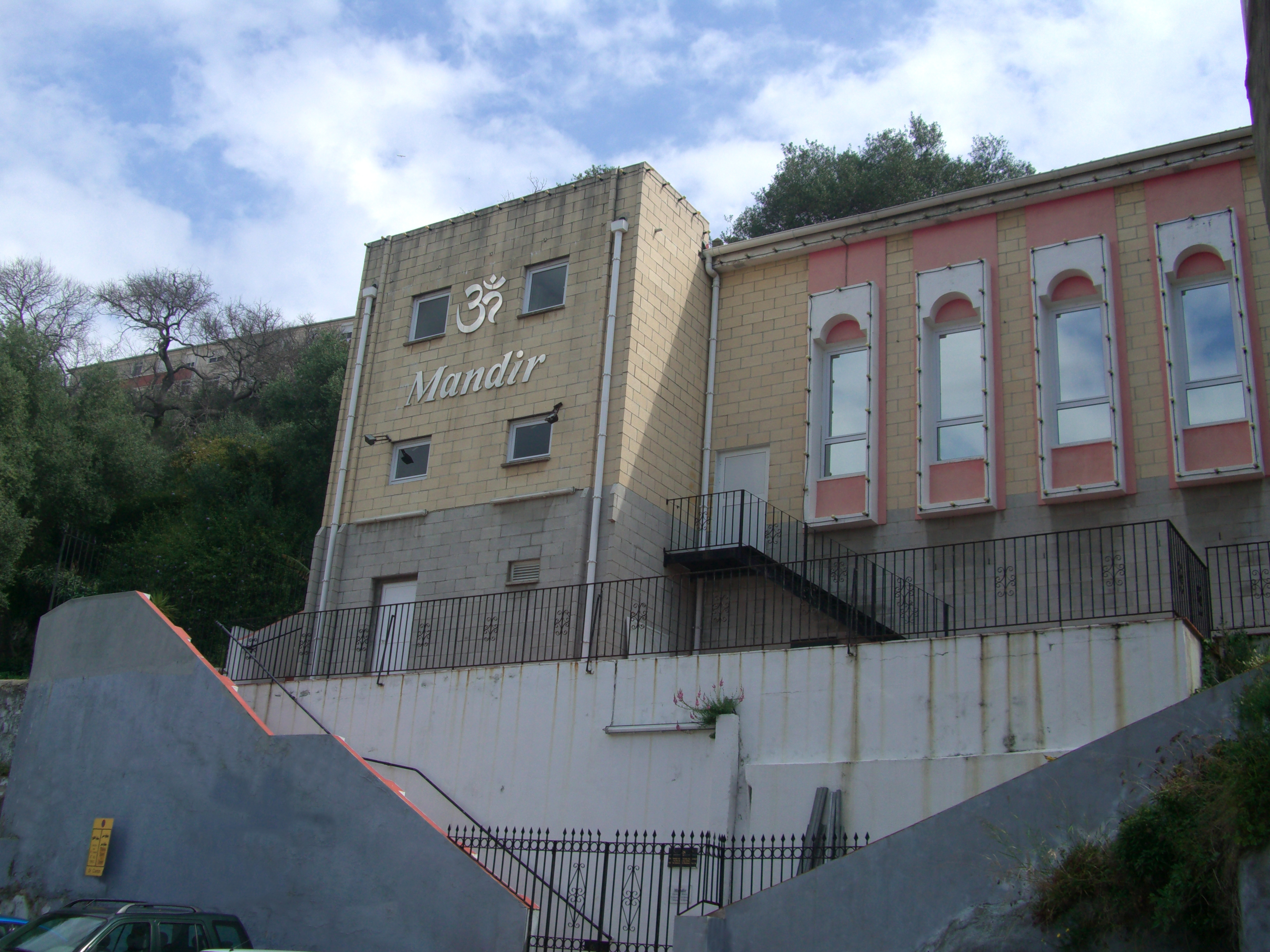
- Exterior of the temple

- Location within Gibraltar

Religion
- Affiliation: Hinduism
- Deity: Rama along with his consort Sita, brother Laxman and his devotee Hanuman

Location
- Location: P.O. Box 1235, Engineer's Lane
- Country: Gibraltar
- Coordinates: 36°8′31.5″N 5°21′7.1″W

Architecture
- Completed: 2000

The Gibraltar Hindu Temple (Hindi: जिब्राल्टर हिन्दू मंदिर), also known as Gibraltar Mandir, is a Hindu temple (mandir) in the British Overseas Territory of Gibraltar. Established in 2000, the Gibraltar Hindu Temple is located at Engineer Lane. Gibraltarian Hindus make approximately 1.8% of Gibraltar's population. This is the only Hindu temple in Gibraltar and it serves as the spiritual centre for Hindu population of the territory. The temple is a charitable organisation and aims to maintain and promote Hindu culture in Gibraltar. The presiding deity of the temple is Rama along with his consort Sita, brother Laxman and Hanuman, an ardent devotee of Rama. Besides, there are many other murtis in the temple, including Jhulelal, iṣṭa-devatā of Sindhi people, and Guru Nanak, the first of the ten Sikh Gurus. The temple conducts several study classes related to different Hindu scriptures.

== Arrival of Hindus in Gibraltar ==
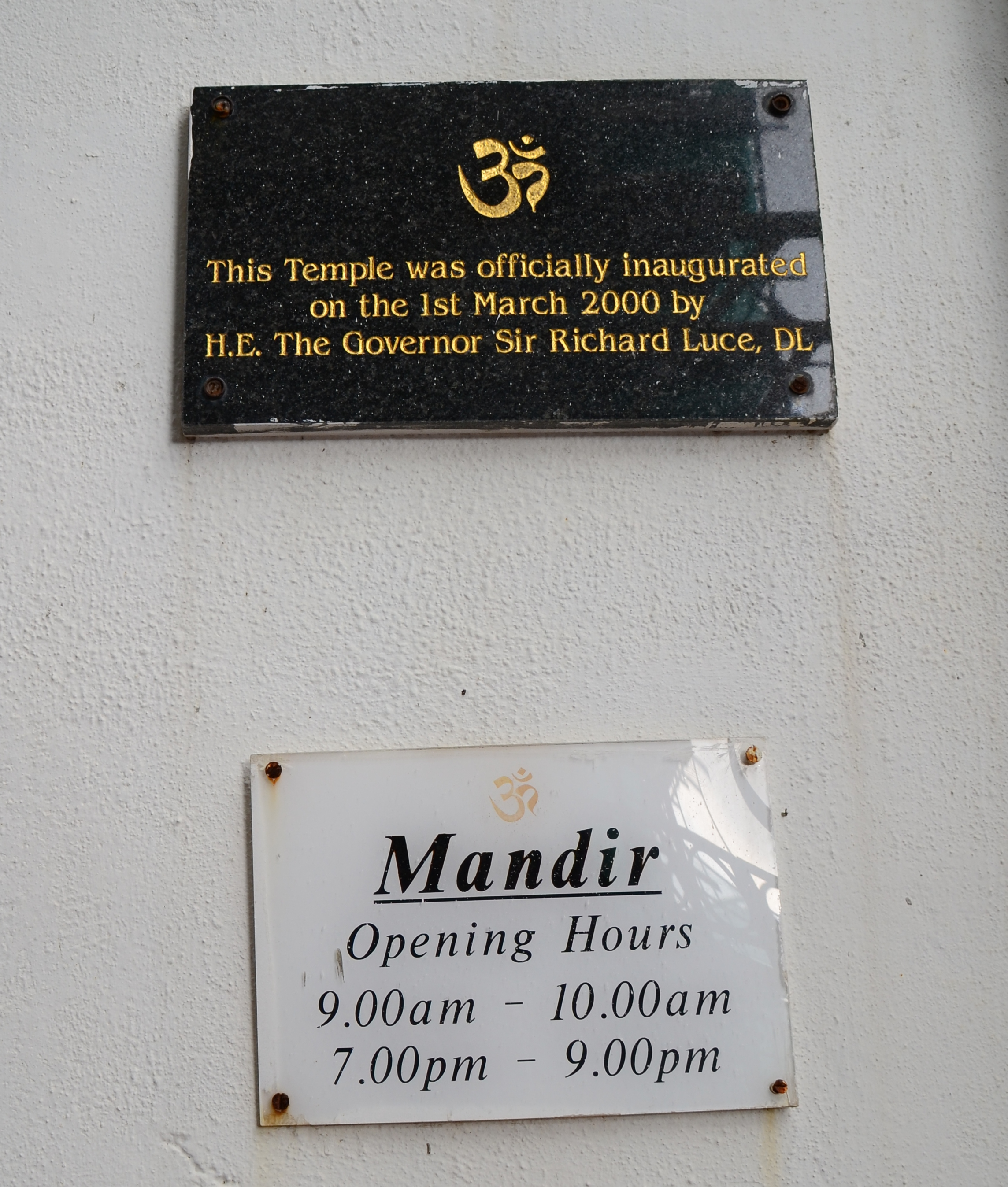
Inauguration plaque

The earliest evidence of a Hindu presence in Gibraltar dates back to the 19th century. A year after the opening of the Suez Canal in 1869, Indian merchants began businesses in Gibraltar. However, they did not settle in the territory. Most of these traders were Sindhi.

In the Gibraltar sovereignty referendum of 1967, Gibraltarians voted overwhelmingly to remain under British sovereignty, which led to the passing of the Gibraltar Constitution Order in 1969. In response, Spain completely closed the border with Gibraltar and severed all communication links. As a result, Hindus who were residing in Spain and had British citizenship moved into Gibraltar. The total number of Hindus in Gibraltar in 1970 were 293 in comparison to 26 in 1961. Most of the Hindus in Gibraltar are of Sindhi origin.

The Hindus joined in with integrated education and the percentage of arranged marriages within the community reduced. On 1 March 2000, Gibraltar Hindu Temple was inaugurated at Engineer Lane, near to Main Street, the main arterial street. The inauguration ceremony was attended by the then Governor of Gibraltar Sir Richard Luce.

In 2012, the Mayor of Gibraltar, Anthony Lima, made the news when he announced that he was inviting the Hindu community into Gibraltar City Hall to celebrate the Hindu festival of Deepavali.

== Deities and worship ==
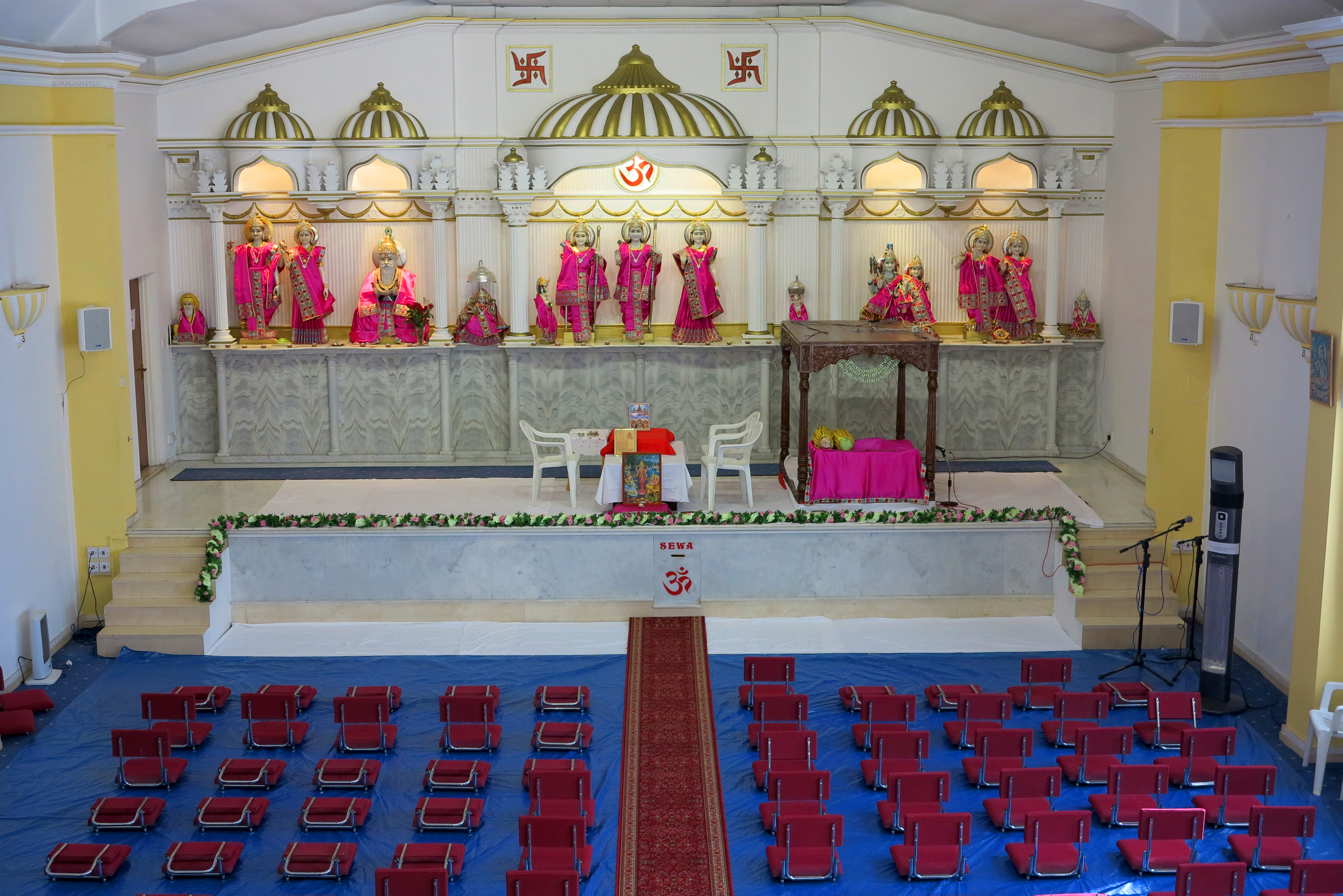
Temple altar with Rama at its centre

The presiding deity of the temple is Rama along with his consort Sita, brother Laxman and Hanuman, ardent devotee of Rama. Besides the main altar at front, there are four other small shrines, which include Vishnu-Lakshmi, Jhulelal, iṣṭa-devatā of Sindhi people, Shiva-Parvati with their younger son Ganesha and Radha Krishna. The temple also has statues of Guru Nanak, the founder of Sikhism and the first of the ten Sikh Gurus, Durga, fierce form of Devi and Sai Baba of Shirdi.

The daily aarti is performed at 7:30 pm. Sathya Sai Baba satsanga and mantras chanting are part of the regular activities of the temple. Shri Satyanarayan Katha is observed on the full moon day (Purnima) of every month. In this religious ritual, the priest recite the katha, which is dedicated to Satyanarayan, a benevolent manifestation of Vishnu.

== Study classes ==
The temple conducts theological classes related to Hindu culture and Hindu scriptures. International Society for Krishna Consciousness also held a monthly Bhagvad Gita class. An hour-long Vedanta study group is conducted on Wednesdays.
