= Zammit =

Zammit (also spelled Zammitt) is a Maltese, Libyan and Tunisian surname of Berber origin. Notable people with the surname include:

- Aidan Zammit (born 1965), Maltese musician
- Alfredo Cachia Zammit (1890–1960), Maltese politician
- Alexander Zammit (born 1962), Maltese wrestler
- Carmelo Zammit (born 1949), Maltese Roman Catholic prelate and Bishop of Gibraltar
- Charlene Zammit (born 1991), Maltese footballer
- Daniel Zammit-Lewis (born 1993), Maltese squash player
- Darrin Zammit Lupi (born 1968), Maltese photographer and photojournalist
- Edward Zammit Lewis (born 1973), Maltese politician
- Francis Zammit Dimech (1954–2025), Maltese politician
- Frederick Zammit, Maltese TV writer
- Horace Zammitt (born c. 1936), Gibraltarian politician
- Ivan Zammit (born 1972), Maltese footballer
- Joseph Zammit (1932–2019), Australian wrestler
- Joseph Zammit McKeon (born 1956), Maltese judge
- Liam Zammit (born 1981), Australian cricketer
- Lou Drofenik, (born Lou Zammit, 1941), Maltese-Australian novelist and academic
- Louis Rees-Zammit (born 2001), Welsh rugby union and American football player
- Michael Zammit (born 1954), Maltese philosopher
- Michael Zammit Tabona (born 1950), Maltese entrepreneur
- Myriam Spiteri Debono (born Miriam Zammit, 1952), Maltese politician
- Nicholas Zammit (1815–1899), Maltese philosopher
- Ninu Zammit (born 1952), Maltese politician
- Olga Zammitt (born 1940), Mayor of Gibraltar
- Paul Zammit (born 1941), Australian politician
- Paul Zammit (footballer) (born 1969), Maltese footballer and manager
- Rita Incerti (born 1961, aka Rita Zammit), Australian judge
- Robert Zammit, Australian veterinarian and TV personality
- Shona Zammit (born 1996), Maltese footballer
- Stanley Zammit, Maltese politician
- Stephanie Zammit (born 1985), former Miss Malta
- Sir Themistocles Zammit (1864–1935), Maltese archeologist, historian and medical doctor
