= Solomon Levy =

Gibraltarian estate agent and Mayor of Gibraltar

Solomon Levy MBE JP
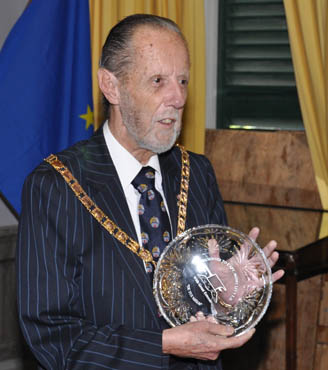
- Solomon Levy at the Mayor's Parlour, City Hall

11th Mayor of Gibraltar
- In office 1 August 2008 – 31 July 2009
- Deputy: Olga Zammitt
- Preceded by: Clive Beltran
- Succeeded by: Olga Zammitt
- Constituency: Gibraltar

Personal details
- Born: 26 October 1936 Gibraltar
- Died: 22 December 2016 (aged 80) Gibraltar
- Spouse: Sara
- Relations: Joshua Hassan (uncle)
- Children: Five
- Occupation: Estate agent
- Awards: MBE
- Nickname: Momy

Military service
- Allegiance: Gibraltar
- Branch/service: British Army
- Years of service: 18
- Unit: Gibraltar Defence Force

Solomon "Momy" Levy MBE JP (26 October 1936 – 22 December 2016), was a Gibraltarian estate agent and the Mayor of Gibraltar. He held office from 1 August 2008 to 31 July 2009.

A member of the Gibraltarian Jewish community, Levy was the nephew of Sir Joshua Hassan and was an estate agent before he took office. He founded Solomon Levy FRICS in 1960. Levy served 18 years with the Gibraltar Defence Force and was the unit's first Jewish officer.

The city of Funchal, Madeira, and Gibraltar were twinned on 13 May 2009 by their then mayors, Miguel Albuquerque and Solomon, who had been an evacuee during the evacuation of the Gibraltarian civilian population during World War II from Gibraltar to Madeira. Solomon then had a meeting with the then President of Madeira Alberto João Jardim.

Levy died in St Bernard's Hospital in Gibraltar on 22 December 2016. He was 80.

Civic offices
Preceded by Clive Beltran	Mayor of Gibraltar; 1 August 2008 – 31 July 2009	Succeeded by Olga Zammitt
