= Hinduism in Gibraltar =

Gibraltarian Hindus
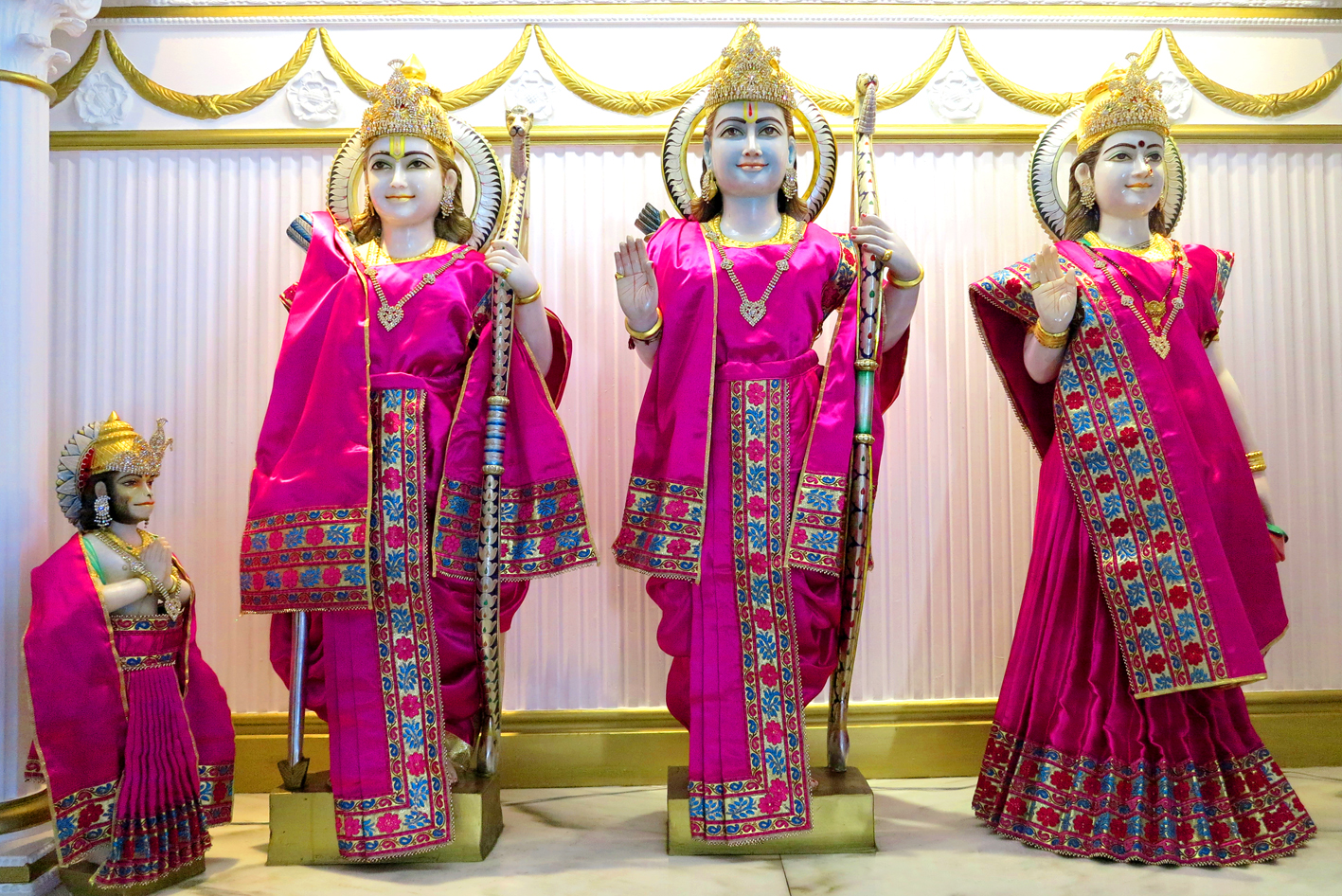
- Rama, Lakshmana and Hanuman in Gibraltar Hindu Temple.

Total population
- 628 (2012); 2% of total Population

Religions
- Hinduism

Scriptures
- Bhagavad Gita, Vedas

Languages
- Sanskrit (sacred); English, Spanish, Llanito & Sindhi

Hinduism is a minority faith in Gibraltar followed by 2% of the population. Most of the Hindus in Gibraltar are of Sindhi origin.

== Demographics ==
According to 2000 census Hindus numbered 491 and made up 1.8% of the population of Gibraltar. According to an estimate from 2012, the population of Hindus made up 2%.

The demographics of Hindus from 1970 to 2012:

Year	Population of Hindus	Percent of Hindus	Percentage change
1970	238	1.0%	
1981	393	1.5%	+0.5%
1991	555	2.1%	+0.6%
2001	491	1.8%	-0.3%
2012	628	2.0%	+0.2%

== History ==
The first people in Gibraltar from British India are thought to have arrived in 1870 from the area around Hyderabad (Sindh) taking advantage of the new Suez Canal. The new Sindhi merchants were able to establish businesses with local managers that they could manage remotely. Indians faced some resistance from Gibraltarians and in 1921 the seven Hindu traders required licences to operate. By 1950 the number of licences had tripled but the real demand for assistance was when the border was closed by the Spanish and there were no Spanish shop assistants. There were nearly 300 trading licences by 1970.

There was resistance to the Hindu community but arranged marriages were reducing and the community shared common schools with the other groups in Gibraltar. It was said that the date for deciding whether a person was a true Gibraltarian was designed to exclude as many Indians as possible but by 1973 the local Hindu lawyer Haresh Budhrani assessed that Hindus were able to fully join in with the community.

On the day of Divali in 1993 the community started using the Gibraltar Hindu Temple. By 1999 the decoration was complete and the Prana pratishta ceremony was formally performed by a priest from India. The wider community celebrated the new temple when the Governor of Gibraltar Richard Luce formally opened the temple on 1 March 2000.

== Contemporary Society ==
In 2004 Budhrani was elected the Speaker in the House of Assembly and he later became the first speaker of the Gibraltar Parliament.

In 2012 the Mayor of Gibraltar made the news when he announced that he was inviting the Hindu community into Gibraltar City Hall to celebrate the Hindu festival of Divali.

== See also ==
- Hinduism in Guadeloupe
- Hinduism in Reunion
- Gibraltar Hindu Temple
