= Haresh Budhrani =

Gibraltarian barrister of Indian origin

The Honourable Haresh Kishinchand Budhrani KC

5th Speaker of the Gibraltar Parliament
- In office 2004–2012
- Preceded by: John Alcantara
- Succeeded by: Adolfo Canepa

Personal details
- Born: 30 June 1952 Mumbai, India
- Education: King's College London; College of Law
- Occupation: Barrister businessman politician
- Portfolio: Chairman of the Hindu Merchants' Association; Speaker of the Gibraltar Parliament

Haresh Kishinchand Budhrani KC (born 30 June 1952) is a Gibraltarian barrister of Indian origin. He was Speaker of the Gibraltar Parliament from September 2004 to October 2012.

== Biography ==
Budhrani was born in Mumbai, India, in June 1952. He is of Sindhi origin. He was educated in Derbyshire and later at the College of Law, Guildford. Budhrani commented on the growing acceptability of Hindus in Gibraltar – by 1973 he assessed that Hindus were able to fully join in with the local community.

He graduated in Law in 1974 from King's College London. Budhrani later attended the Inns of Court School of Law becoming a barrister in August 1975.

He was president of the Hindu Merchants' Association of Gibraltar until 2004, following the resignation of The Hon. Judge John E. Alcantara who had been nominated for the position of Speaker by the governing Gibraltar Social Democrats (without the approval of the Opposition). In September 2004, Budhrani took office as Speaker of the Gibraltar House of Assembly (later the Gibraltar Parliament).

In December 2011, he was reappointed by Chief Minister, Fabian Picardo of the Gibraltar Socialist Labour Party.

On 28 September 2012 Budhrani announced that he would relinquish the position of Speaker.

== Controversies ==
In May 2012, he was accused of having defaulted business tax payments, and as consequence, his salary of Speaker was withheld by the Gibraltar Treasury. Budhrani stated that although a deduction was really being done from month to month, it was the result of an agreement signed with the Gibraltar Income Tax Office, not an imposition of the same, and that the amount of his debt were not as high as cited by the local media (the Gibraltar Chronicle implied it was over £150,000).
