= Mr. Basketball (disambiguation) =

Mr. Basketball is an unofficial award given to the person chosen as the best high school boys basketball player in many American states, regions, or metropolitan areas.

Mr. Basketball may also refer to:

- George Mikan (1924–2005), an American basketball player
- Tal Brody (born 1943), an American-Israeli basketball player
- John Gonçalves, former Mayor of Gibraltar (2019-2021) and FIBA Europe Vice President (2010-2014,2019-2023)
