= Horace J. Zammitt =

Gibraltarian politician

The Honourable Horace J. Zammitt Esquire
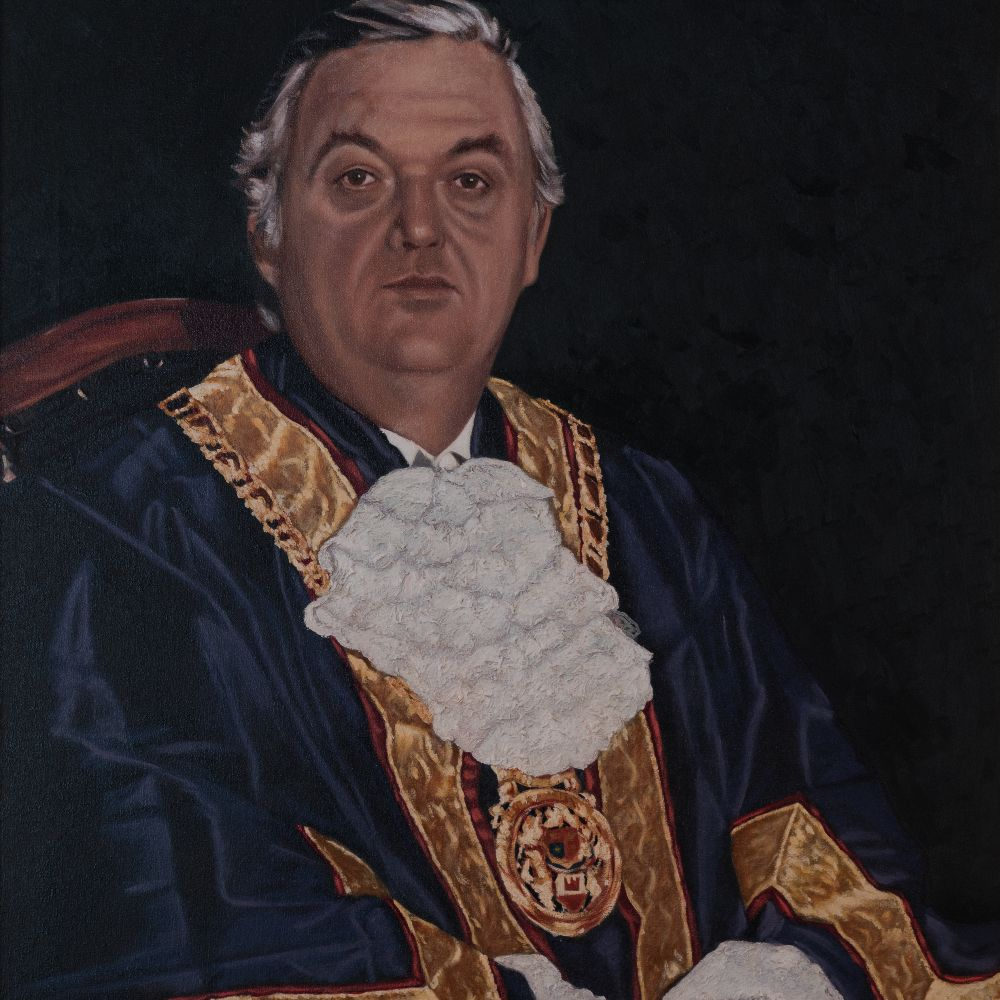

Mayor of Gibraltar
- In office January 1, 1979 – July 31, 1979
- Preceded by: Adolfo Canepa
- Succeeded by: Abraham Serfaty

Personal details
- Born: c. 1936

Horace John Zammitt (born c. 1936) is a Gibraltarian politician who served as the 5th mayor of Gibraltar. His term lasted from January 1, 1979 to July 31, 1979.

Starting in 1976, he was elected to the Gibraltar Parliament with the fourth most votes. He continued his role through at least 1988.

In 1973, he was Gibraltar's Minister of Sport, and continued through role through at least 1983. He also served as its Minister of Tourism from at least 1982 to 1985.

== Personal life ==
Outside of his political role, Zammitt was also a chief of police. He is a former long-distance swimmer, and swam 17 miles of the Humber in 1973. He has four children. He is related to fellow Gibraltar mayor Olga Zammitt.

Civic offices
Preceded by Adolfo Canepa	Mayor of Gibraltar; January 1, 1979 – July 31, 1979	Succeeded by Abraham Serfaty
