= Julio Alcantara =

British politician and mayor

His Worship Julio Alcantara MBE
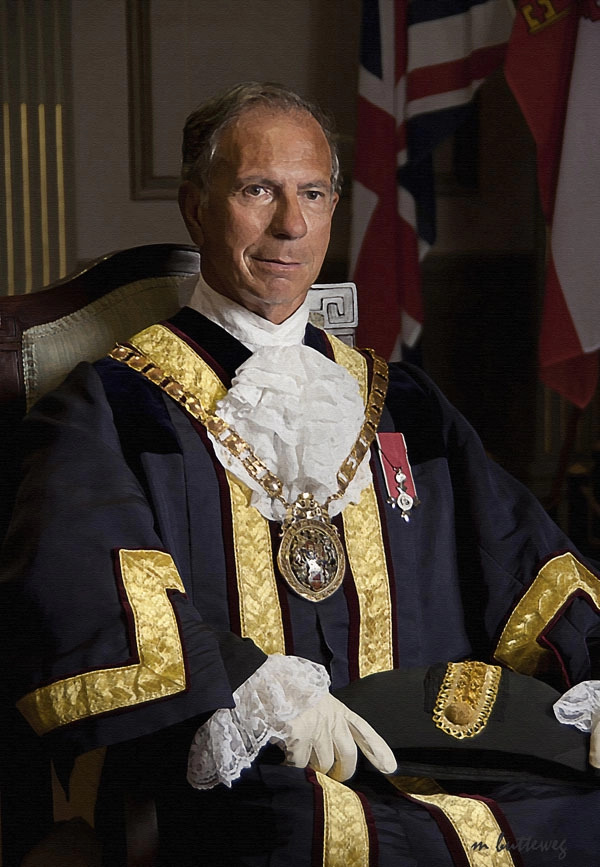
- Alcantara in July of 2012.

14th Mayor of Gibraltar
- In office 1 August 2011 – 31 July 2012
- Preceded by: Anthony Lombard
- Succeeded by: Anthony Lima
- Constituency: Gibraltar

3rd Deputy Mayor of Gibraltar
- In office 1 August 2010 – 31 July 2011
- Preceded by: Anthony Lombard
- Succeeded by: Anthony Lima

Personal details
- Born: 20 October 1944 (age 81) Gibraltar

Julio James Alcantara was the Mayor of Gibraltar. He was appointed Deputy Mayor on 1 August 2010 and Mayor on 1 August 2011. A former headteacher, he was previously Gibraltar's Director of Education.

Alcantara was appointed Member of the Order of the British Empire (MBE) in the 2011 New Year Honours for services to education and the community in Gibraltar.
