= Anthony Lima =

Gibraltarian politician

His Worship Anthony "Tony" Lima MBE RD
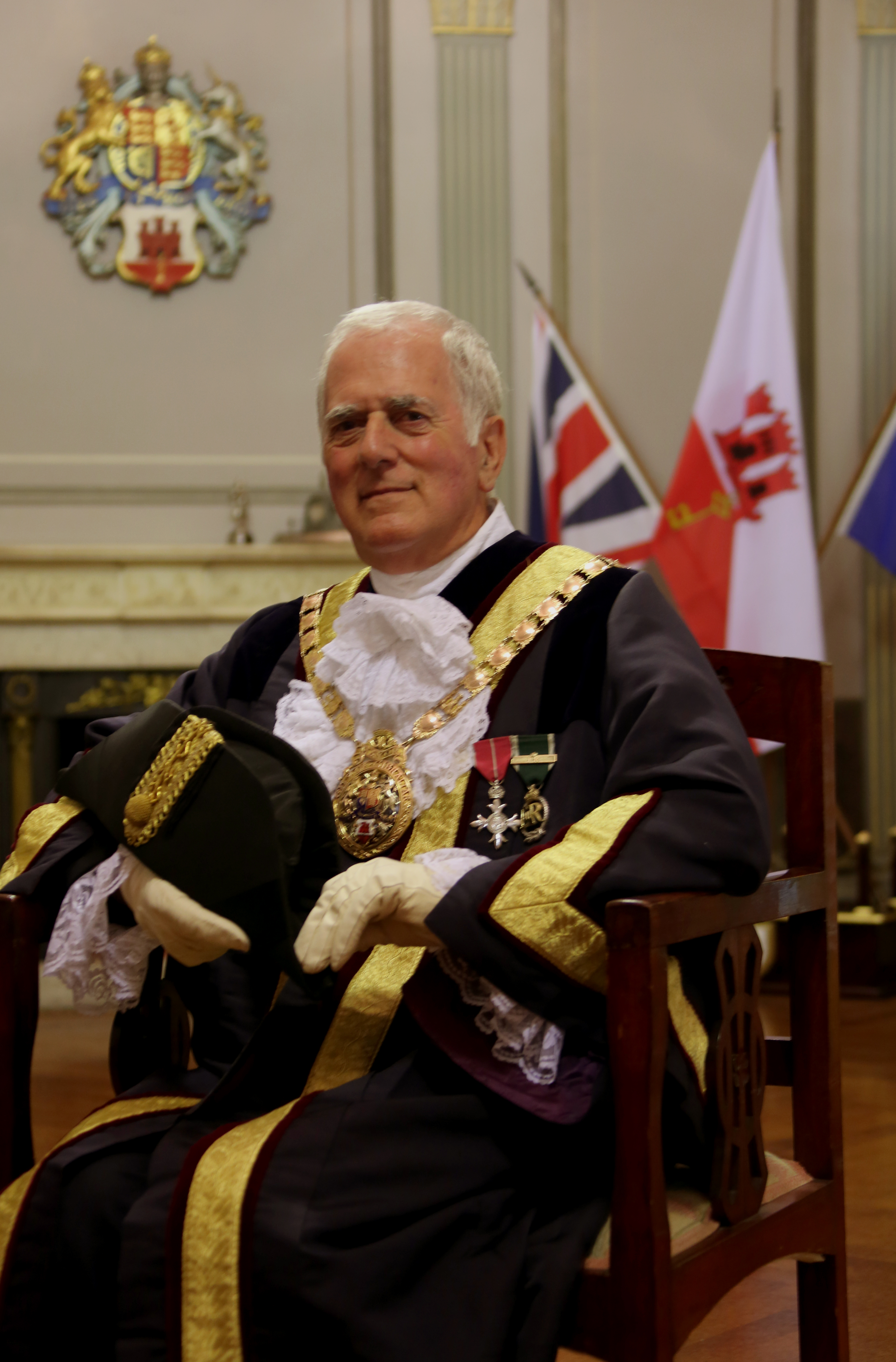
- His Worship Mayor Anthony Lima at the Mayor's Parlour, Gibraltar City Hall.

15th Mayor of Gibraltar
- In office 1 August 2012 – 31 July 2014
- Preceded by: Julio Alcantara
- Succeeded by: Adolfo Canepa
- Constituency: Gibraltar

4th Deputy Mayor of Gibraltar
- In office 1 August 2011 – 31 July 2012
- Preceded by: Julio Alcantara

Personal details
- Born: 17 January 1946 (age 80) Gibraltar
- Occupation: Customs collector

Anthony "Tony" Lima, MBE RD (born 17 January 1946) is a Gibraltarian former Mayor of Gibraltar. He was appointed to the office of deputy mayor on 1 August 2011 and to that of mayor on 1 August 2012. He was a former Customs Collector and Commanding officer of the Royal Naval Reserve (RNR) unit HMS Calpe.

== Career ==
Lima began his career almost 50 years before being appointed mayor when he was interviewed for Clerk Grade 2 with the then City Council at the City Hall. He subsequently became personal assistant to the then Mayor Sir Joshua Hassan and later, under the 1969 Constitution to Sir William Thompson and Sir Alfred Vasquez when duties were relocated to the House of Assembly (now the Gibraltar Parliament) on the opposite side of John Mackintosh Square.

During his time in the Civil Service Lima also held the position of customs collector and was also the last commanding officer of the RNR unit, HMS Calpe, before the unit was disestablished in 1993. On 17 October 2013, during a splice the mainbrace ceremony held at Gibraltar's Naval Base, Lima was appointed an Honorary Commander Royal Naval Reserve, making him the only Honorary Commander RNR who is not from the United Kingdom. The honour was bestowed on the recommendation of the First Sea Lord and approved by Queen Elizabeth II.

== Mayoralty ==
Lima became Mayor Julio Alcantara's deputy from 1 August 2011 until he took over the mayoralty himself on 1 August 2012 following an appointment which enjoyed unanimous support across the Gibraltar Parliament. He was invested in the City Hall that same day. He was the first of the new style civic mayors, under the 2006 Constitution, to be appointed for a term exceeding one year.

Lima was originally set to be succeeded by former Mayor Anthony Lombard, who would return to City Hall for a second term. However, on 17 March 2014 the Government of Gibraltar gave notice of a motion before Parliament to appoint current Speaker of the Gibraltar Parliament Adolfo Canepa as Lima's successor instead. Canepa had already held the office of mayor from 1976 to 1978 while a government minister for the Hassan administration.

Civic offices
| Preceded by Julio Alcantara | Mayor of Gibraltar; 1 August 2012 – 31 July 2013 | Adolfo Canepa |
| Preceded by Julio Alcantara | Deputy Mayor of Gibraltar; 1 August 2011 – 31 July 2012 | None |
