= Miss Gibraltar =

Beauty contest

Miss Gibraltar Organization
- Logo of the Miss Gibraltar event
- Formation: 1959
- Type: Beauty pageant
- Headquarters: Gibraltar
- Location: Gibraltar
- Members: Miss World; Miss Supranational; Miss Grand International; Miss Cosmo
- Official language: English
- Key people: Gibraltar Cultural Services
- Website: MissGibraltar.gi

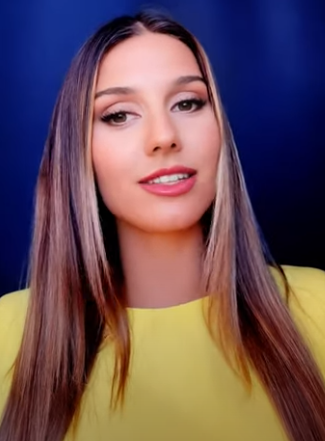
1st vice–Miss 2022, Jaylynn Cruz, the first Gibraltar candidate at Miss Grand International.

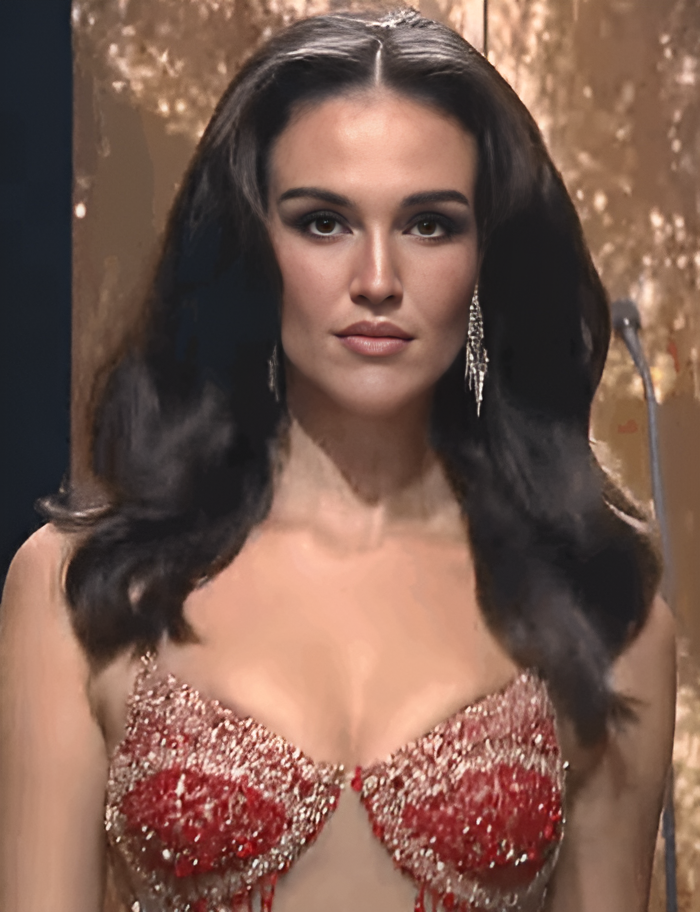
Faith Torres, Gibraltar representative to Miss World 2023 and Miss Grand International 2024.

Miss Gibraltar is a national beauty pageant in Gibraltar.

== History ==
The first Miss Gibraltar pageant was held in 1959, however, it did not resume until 1964. The winner represents her nation at Miss World annually.

== International competition ==
In 2009, the 59th Miss World pageant was held on 12 December, at the Gallagher Convention Centre in Johannesburg, South Africa. 112 contestants worldwide competed for the crown, marking the biggest turnout in the pageant's history. Gibraltar's Kaiane Aldorino, aged 23, was crowned Miss World 2009. Kaiane won Miss World Beach Beauty en route to the top prize sparking off mass celebrations in Gibraltar as viewers watched the event live on television.

Kaiane was flown to Gibraltar from London on a private jet on 17 December where she was greeted at Gibraltar Airport by the Government, family and friends. From there, Kaiane was paraded down Main Street in an open-top car (the same one used by Charles and Diana when they visited Gibraltar to embark the Royal Yacht Britannia to start their honeymoon cruise) preceded by the band of the Royal Gibraltar Regiment and then appeared at the City Hall balcony. The celebrations culminated with a fireworks display from Gibraltar Harbour.

As a tribute to Kaiane Aldorino, the Gibraltar Philatelic Bureau issued a special sheet of stamps.

Besides the main winners, the pageant's runners-up were occasionally sent to compete at the international stage, such as the 2013 1st runner-up, Jamielee Randall, who was placed among the top 15 finalists at Miss International 2013 in Tokyo, Japan, and the 2022 1st runner-up, Jaylynn Cruz, was sent to compete at Miss Grand International 2023 in Vietnam.

== Titleholders ==
Miss World

Miss International
Miss Supranational

Miss Grand International
Miss Cosmo

=== Miss Gibraltar ===
The winner of Miss Gibraltar represents Gibraltar at the oldest existing pageant, Miss World.

Year	Miss Gibraltar	1st Runner-up	2nd Runner-up
1959	Viola Abudarham	Carmen Figueredo	Unknown
1964	Lydia Davis	Unknown	Unknown
1965	Rosemary Viñales	Muriel Tacon	Suzanne Chipolina
1966	Grace Valverde	Janet Sawks	Marie Carmen de la Paz
1967	Laura Bassadone	Unknown	Unknown
1968	Sandra Sanguinetti	Moira Canepa	Angelita Bassadone
1969	Marliou Chiappe	Conchita Rocca	Angelita Lavagna
1970	Carmen Gómez	Yvonne Posso	Christine Anthony
1971	Lisette Chipolina	Miriam Parody	Christine Anthony
1972	Rosemary Catania	Christine Ghio	Suzanne Chipolina
1973	Josephine Rodriguez	Emily McMahon	Belinda Vinet
1974	Patricia Orfila	Susan Clifton	Suzie Soiza
1975	Lilian Lara	Unknown	Unknown
1976	Rosemary Parody	Susan Costa	Angela Guelchi
1977	Lourdes Holmes	Gina Arnao	Yvette Ocaña
1978	Rosanna Bonfante	Karen Cardona	Susan Bonavia
1979	Audrey Lopez	Christine Borge	Joanna Brooks
1980	Yvette Dominguez	Pilar Wahnon	Maria Elena Moreno
1981	Yvette Bellido (Resigned)	Pilar Ford (Resigned)	Michelle Lara (Assumed)
1982	Louise Gillingwater	Giselle Ruiz	Yvette Perera
1983	Jessica Palao	Wanda Setter	Carla Bonfante
1984	Karina Hollands	Wanda Setter	Gail Francis
1985	Gail Francis	Dominique Martinez	Michelle Hollands
1986	Dominique Martinez	Maite Sanchez	Gerry Searle
1987	Maite Sanchez	Isabella Serra	Gillaine Chappory
1988	Tatiana Desoiza	Anjette Jones	Karen Felices
1989	Audrey Gingel	Gerry Searle	Joanne Aldorino
1990	Sarah Yeats	Angelique Vassallo	Nicole Jimenez
1991	Ornella Costa	Gillaine de los Santos	Gail Summerfield
1992	Michelle Torres	Gina Gaduzo	Larissa Zarb
1993	Jenifer Ainsworth	Rachel Yeats	Lynette Mifsud
1994	Melissa Berllaque	Lourdes Bebeagua	Melanie Soiza
1995	Monique Chiara	Tyrene Camilleri	Justine Federico
1996	Samantha Lane	Lianna Vinet	Tallitha Field
1997	Rossanna Ressa	Karina Sanchez	Justine Hardy
1998	Melanie Soiza	Aysha Pratts	Sylvana Burns
1999	Abigail Garcia	Katie Cload	Magelle Ignacio
2000	Tessa Sacramento	Caireen Alcantara	Aysha Pratts
2001	Luann Richardson	Sueyenne McNeice	Lyzanne Zammitt
2002	Damaris Hollands (Resigned)	Natalie Monteverde (Assumed)	Bianca Chiara
2003	Kim Falzun	Stephanie Martinez	Ivanka Bensadon
2004	Helen Gustafson	Kelly Villalta	Elaine Martinez
2005	Melanie Chipolina	Shyanne Almedia	Kirian Lopez
2006	Hayley O`Brien	Lian Lucia Falzun	Angelique Ruiz
2007	Danielle Perez	Chantal Santos	Jordana Ryan
2008	Krystle Robba	Samantha Enriles	Kathryn Gonçalves
2009	Kaiane Aldorino	Maxine De La Rosa	Jordana Lavagna
2010	Larissa Dalli	Jemma Rocca	Leandra Howe
2011	Michelle Gillingwater Pedersen	Jessica Baldachino	Chantal Canepa
2012	Jessica Baldachino	Kerrianne Massetti	Christina Ainsworth
2013	Maroua Kharbouch	Jamielee Randall	Stacey Britto
2014	Shyanne Azzopardi	Kristy Torres	Claire Nuñez
2015	Hannah Bado	Bianca Pisharello	Natalia Nunez
2016	Kayley Mifsud	Joseanne Bear	Aisha Benyahya
2017	Jodie Garcia	Tessa Britto	Sian Dean
2018	Star Farrugia	Not awarded	Not awarded
2019	Celine Bolaños	Janice Sampere	Jyza Balban
2020	Due to the impact of COVID-19 pandemic, no pageant in 2020		
2021	Janice Sampere (Appointed)	Not awarded	Not awarded
2022	Due to the impact of COVID-19 pandemic, no pageant in 2022		
2023	Faith Torres	Jaylynn Cruz	Michelle Lopez Desoisa
2024	Shania Ballester	Phoebe Noble	Lauren Shephard (Resigned)
2025	Julia Horne	Ashlyn Gonzalez	Niah Guiling
2026	Janelle Ticknell Smith	Lucia Wood	Natasha Mena

== International Competitions (Current franchises) ==
=== Miss World Gibraltar ===
- : Declared as Winner
- : Ended as runner-up or top 5/6 qualification
- : Ended as one of the finalists or semi-finalists
- : Ended as special awards winner

Year	Miss World Gibraltar	National title	Placement at Miss World	Special awards
Miss Gibraltar directorship – a franchise holder to Miss World from 1959
2027	Janelle Ticknell Smith	Miss Gibraltar 2026	TBA	
2026	Julia Horne	Miss Gibraltar 2025	Top 22	People’s Choice award; Miss World Talent (Top 23)
2025	Shania Ballester	Miss Gibraltar 2024	Unplaced	
Miss World 2023 was rescheduled to 2024 due to the change of host and when entering India as the new host, there were several issues that caused the postponement until March 2024.
2023	Faith Torres	Miss Gibraltar 2023	Top 40	Miss World Talent (Top 14)
Miss World 2021 was rescheduled to 16 March 2022 due to the COVID-19 pandemic outbreak in Puerto Rico, no edition started in 2022
2021	Janice Sampere	Appointed as Miss World Gibraltar 2021	Unplaced	Miss World Talent (Top 27)
Due to the impact of COVID-19 pandemic, no competition held in 2020
2019	Celine Bolaños	Miss Gibraltar 2019	Unplaced	Miss World Talent (Top 27)
2018	Star Farrugia	Miss Gibraltar 2018	Unplaced	
2017	Jodie Garcia	Miss Gibraltar 2017	Unplaced	
2016	Kayley Mifsud	Miss Gibraltar 2016	Unplaced	Tug of war (Miss World Sports and Fitness); Miss World Sports and Fitness (Top 27)
2015	Hannah Bado	Miss Gibraltar 2015	Unplaced	
2014	Shyanne Azzopardi	Miss Gibraltar 2014	Unplaced	
2013	Maroua Kharbouch	Miss Gibraltar 2013	Top 6	People's Choice award
2012	Jessica Baldachino	Miss Gibraltar 2012	Unplaced	
2011	Michelle Gillingwater Pedersen	Miss Gibraltar 2011	Unplaced	
2010	Larissa Dalli	Miss Gibraltar 2010	Unplaced	
2009	Kaiane Aldorino	Miss Gibraltar 2009	Miss World 2009	Miss World Sports (Top 12); Miss World Talent (Top 22)
2008	Krystel Robba	Miss Gibraltar 2008	Unplaced	Miss World Talent (Top 19)
2007	Danielle Pérez	Miss Gibraltar 2007	Unplaced	
2006	Hayley O'Brien	Miss Gibraltar 2006	Unplaced	
2005	Melanie Chipolina	Miss Gibraltar 2005	Unplaced	
2004	Helen Gustafson	Miss Gibraltar 2004	Unplaced	
2003	Kim Marie Falzun	Miss Gibraltar 2003	Unplaced	
2002	Damaris Hollands	Miss Gibraltar 2002	Unplaced	
2001	Luann Richardson	Miss Gibraltar 2001	Unplaced	
2000	Tessa Sacramento	Miss Gibraltar 2000	Unplaced	
1999	Abigail Garcia	Miss Gibraltar 1999	Unplaced	
1998	Melanie Soiza	Miss Gibraltar 1998	Unplaced	
1997	Rosanna Ressa	Miss Gibraltar 1997	Unplaced	
1996	Samantha Lane	Miss Gibraltar 1996	Unplaced	
1995	Monique Chiara	Miss Gibraltar 1995	Unplaced	
1994	Melissa Berllaque	Miss Gibraltar 1994	Unplaced	
1993	Jennifer Jane Ainsworth	Miss Gibraltar 1993	Unplaced	
1992	Michelle Torres	Miss Gibraltar 1992	Unplaced	
1991	Ornella Costa	Miss Gibraltar 1991	Unplaced	
1990	Sarah Yeats	Miss Gibraltar 1990	Unplaced	
1989	Audrey Gingell	Miss Gibraltar 1989	Unplaced	
1988	Tatiana Desoiza	Miss Gibraltar 1988	Unplaced	
1987	Mayte Sanchez	Miss Gibraltar 1987	Unplaced	
1986	Dominique Martinez	Miss Gibraltar 1986	Unplaced	
1985	Gail Francis	Miss Gibraltar 1985	Unplaced	
1984	Karina Hollands	Miss Gibraltar 1984	Unplaced	
1983	Jessica Palao	Miss Gibraltar 1983	Unplaced	
1982	Louise Gillingwater	Miss Gibraltar 1982	Unplaced	
1981	Yvette Maria Bellido	Miss Gibraltar 1981	Unplaced	
1980	Yvette Domínguez	Miss Gibraltar 1980	Unplaced	
1979	Audrey Lopez	Miss Gibraltar 1979	Unplaced	
1978	Rosanna Bonfante	Miss Gibraltar 1978	Unplaced	
1977	Lourdes Holmes	Miss Gibraltar 1977	Unplaced	
1976	Rosemarie Parody	Miss Gibraltar 1976	Unplaced	
1975	Lillian Anne Lara	Miss Gibraltar 1975	Unplaced	
1974	Patricia Orfila	Miss Gibraltar 1974	Unplaced	
1973	Josephine Rodríguez	Miss Gibraltar 1973	Unplaced	
1972	Rosemarie Vivian Catania	Miss Gibraltar 1972	Unplaced	
1971	Lisette Chipolina	Miss Gibraltar 1971	Unplaced	
1970	Carmen Gomez	Miss Gibraltar 1970	Unplaced	
1969	Marilou Chiappe	Miss Gibraltar 1969	Unplaced	
1968	Sandra Sanguinetti	Miss Gibraltar 1968	Unplaced	
1967	Laura Bassadone	Miss Gibraltar 1967	Unplaced	
1966	Grace Valverde	Miss Gibraltar 1966	Unplaced	
1965	Rosemarie Viňales	Miss Gibraltar 1965	Unplaced	
1964	Lydia Davis	Miss Gibraltar 1964	Unplaced	
Did not compete between 1960 and 1963
1959	Viola Howells	Miss Gibraltar 1959	Unplaced	

=== Miss Grand Gibraltar ===
Gibraltar debuted in the Miss Grand International pageant in 2023 when the Miss Gibraltar organiser "No 1 model Gibraltar," headed by Kelvin Hewitt, appointed the 1st runner-up of that year's contest, Jaylynn Cruz, to join the international event in Vietnam.

- : Declared as Winner
- : Ended as runner-up or top 5/6 qualification
- : Ended as one of the finalists or semi-finalists
- : Ended as special awards winner

Year	Miss Grand Gibraltar	National title	Placement at Miss Grand International	Special awards
Miss Gibraltar directorship – a franchise holder to Miss Grand International from 2023
2024	Faith Torres	Miss Gibraltar 2023	Unplaced	
2024	Lauren Shephard	Miss Gibraltar 2024 – 2nd Runner-up	Resigned	
2023	Jaylynn Cruz	Miss Gibraltar 2023 – 1st Runner-up	Unplaced	Top 10 – Miss Popular Vote

=== Miss Supranational Gibraltar ===
- : Declared as Winner
- : Ended as runner-up or top 5/6 qualification
- : Ended as one of the finalists or semi-finalists
- : Ended as special awards winner

Year	Miss Supranational Gibraltar	National title	Placement at Miss Supranational	Special awards
2027	TBA	TBA		
2026	Ashlyn Gonzalez	Miss Gibraltar 2025 – 1st Runner-up		
Miss Gibraltar directorship – a franchise holder to Miss Supranational from 2014
2024	Phoebe Noble	Miss Gibraltar 2024 – 1st Runner-up	Unplaced	Miss Talent (Top 7); Miss Influencer Opportunity (Top 13)
2023	Michelle Lopez Desoisa	Miss Gibraltar 2023 – 2nd Runner-up	Top 12	Miss Talent (Top 29)
Did not compete between 2018 and 2022
2017	Sian Dean	Miss Gibraltar 2017 – 2nd Runner-up	Unplaced	
2016	Aisha Ben Yahya	Miss Gibraltar 2016 – 2nd Runner-up	Unplaced	
2015	Nathalie Núñez	Miss Gibraltar 2015 – 2nd Runner-up	Unplaced	Miss Elegance
2014	Claire Nuñez	Miss Gibraltar 2014 – 2nd Runner-up	Unplaced	

=== Miss Cosmo Gibraltar ===
- : Declared as Winner
- : Ended as runner-up or top 5/6 qualification
- : Ended as one of the finalists or semi-finalists
- : Ended as special awards winner

Year	Miss Cosmo Gibraltar	National title	Placement at Miss Cosmo	Special awards
2025	Gabriella Olivero	Miss Teen Gibraltar 2023	Unplaced	Top 26 - Cosmo Impactful Beauty
Kelvin Hewitt directorship – a franchise holder to Miss Cosmo from 2024
2024	Akisha Ferrell	Miss Universe Gibraltar 2024 – 2nd Runner-up	Unplaced	

== Former International licences ==
=== Miss International Gibraltar ===
- : Declared as Winner
- : Ended as runner-up or top 5/6 qualification
- : Ended as one of the finalists or semi-finalists
- : Ended as special awards winner

Year	Miss International Gibraltar	National title	Placement at Miss International	Special awards
Miss Gibraltar directorship – a franchise holder to Miss International between 2012 and 2017
Did not compete since 2018—Present
2017	Tessa Britto	Miss Gibraltar 2017 – 1st Runner-up	Unplaced	
2016	Joseanne Bear	Miss Gibraltar 2016 – 1st Runner-up	Unplaced	
2015	Bianca Pisharello	Miss Gibraltar 2015 – 1st Runner-up	Unplaced	
2014	Kristy Torres	Miss Gibraltar 2014 – 1st Runner-up	Unplaced	
2013	Jamielee Randall	Miss Gibraltar 2013 – 1st Runner-up	Top 15	
2012	Kerrianne Massetti	Miss Gibraltar 2012 – 1st Runner-up	Unplaced	
