= Michelle Gillingwater Pedersen =

Gibraltarian beauty pageant titleholder

- Born: Michelle Gillingwater Pedersen; 29 October 1987 (age 38); Gibraltar
- Occupation: Private bank clerk
- Height: 1.73 m (5 ft 8 in)
- Beauty pageant titleholder
- Title: Miss Gibraltar 2011
- Hair color: Light brown
- Eye color: Green

Michelle Gillingwater Pedersen (born 29 October 1987) is a Gibraltarian beauty pageant titleholder who was crowned Miss Gibraltar 2011. Gillingwater Pedersen, a private bank clerk and model, represented Gibraltar as Miss Gibraltar in Miss World 2011 in London, UK, on 6 November 2011.

Gillingwater Pedersen speaks English, Danish and Spanish fluently.

Gillingwater Pedersen was crowned Miss Gibraltar by her predecessor, Larissa Dalli, during a beauty pageant held at the Alameda Open Air Theatre on 25 June 2011.

Gillingwater Pedersen's mother Louise Gillingwater, also a Gibraltarian beauty pageant titleholder who was crowned Miss Gibraltar 1982, represented Gibraltar in Miss World 1982. They are the second mother and daughter to win the Miss Gibraltar title. She is of Danish descent.

Preceded by Larissa Dalli	Miss Gibraltar; 2011	Succeeded by Jessica Baldachino
