= Karen Ramagge Phillips =

Gibraltarian judge and politician

Hon. Judge Karen Ramagge Phillips GMH MP

Speaker of the Gibraltar Parliament
- Incumbent
- Assumed office 10 November 2023

Personal details
- Education: University of Bristol

Karen Ramagge Phillips (née Prescott) is a Gibraltarian judge and politician who serves as the Speaker of the Gibraltar Parliament since 2023. Prior to her tenure as speaker she worked in multiple judicial positions and was the first woman to hold the position of notary public and puisne judge in Gibraltar.

== Early life and education ==
Karen Ramagge Prescott graduated from the University of Bristol in 1987, after reading law. Her last name was later changed to Phillips.

== Career ==
Phillips practised law in Gibraltar from 1988 to 1990, and worked as a Crown Counsel from 1990 to 1994. The Centre for Effective Dispute Resolution accredited her as a mediator in 1999. In 2007, she became the first notary public in Gibraltar. In 2017, she was appointed as Master of the Bench of the Middle Temple, the first woman from Gibraltar to achieve it.

Phillips was appointed as a stipendiary magistrate and coroner for Gibraltar in 2007. In 2010, she was appointed as a puisne judge in the Supreme Court of Gibraltar, the first woman to hold that position. In 2019, the Gibraltar Parliament awarded her the Gibraltar Medallion of Honour for her work as the Gibraltar's first female judge. In 2022, Phillips ruled in favour of JPMorgan Chase and against Dmitry Pumpyansky; she allowed for the seizure of Pumpyansky's yacht and for it to be placed up for auction.

Melvyn Farrell, the Speaker of the Gibraltar Parliament, announced his retirement in 2023. Phillips was selected to succeed him on 31 October 2023. Her selection was approved by both the government and opposition. She assumed the position on 10 November, and was the first woman to serve as speaker.

== Works cited ==
=== News ===
- "2019 recipients of Gibraltar Medallions of Honour and Distinction announced". Gibraltar Chronicle. 12 August 2019. Archived from the original on 23 June 2025.
- "Karen Ramagge Prescott will be next Speaker of Parliament as Melvyn Farrell retires". Gibraltar Chronicle. 31 October 2023. Archived from the original on 23 June 2025.
- Culatto, John (3 November 2023). "Supreme Court woman judge to take over as Speaker of Gibraltar Parliament which opens on November 10". The Olive Press. Archived from the original on 23 June 2025.
- Reyes, Brian (23 August 2022). "Bids come in as superyacht linked to Russian businessman goes up for auction". Gibraltar Chronicle. Archived from the original on 23 June 2025.

=== Web ===
- "Masters of the Bench". Middle Temple. Archived from the original on 23 June 2025.
- "Ministry of Equality to Mark International Women's Day 2026 - 128/2026". Government of Gibraltar. 2 March 2026. Archived from the original on 14 March 2026.
