= Adolfo Canepa =

Gibraltarian politician (born 1940)

The Honourable Adolfo Canepa CMG OBE GMH
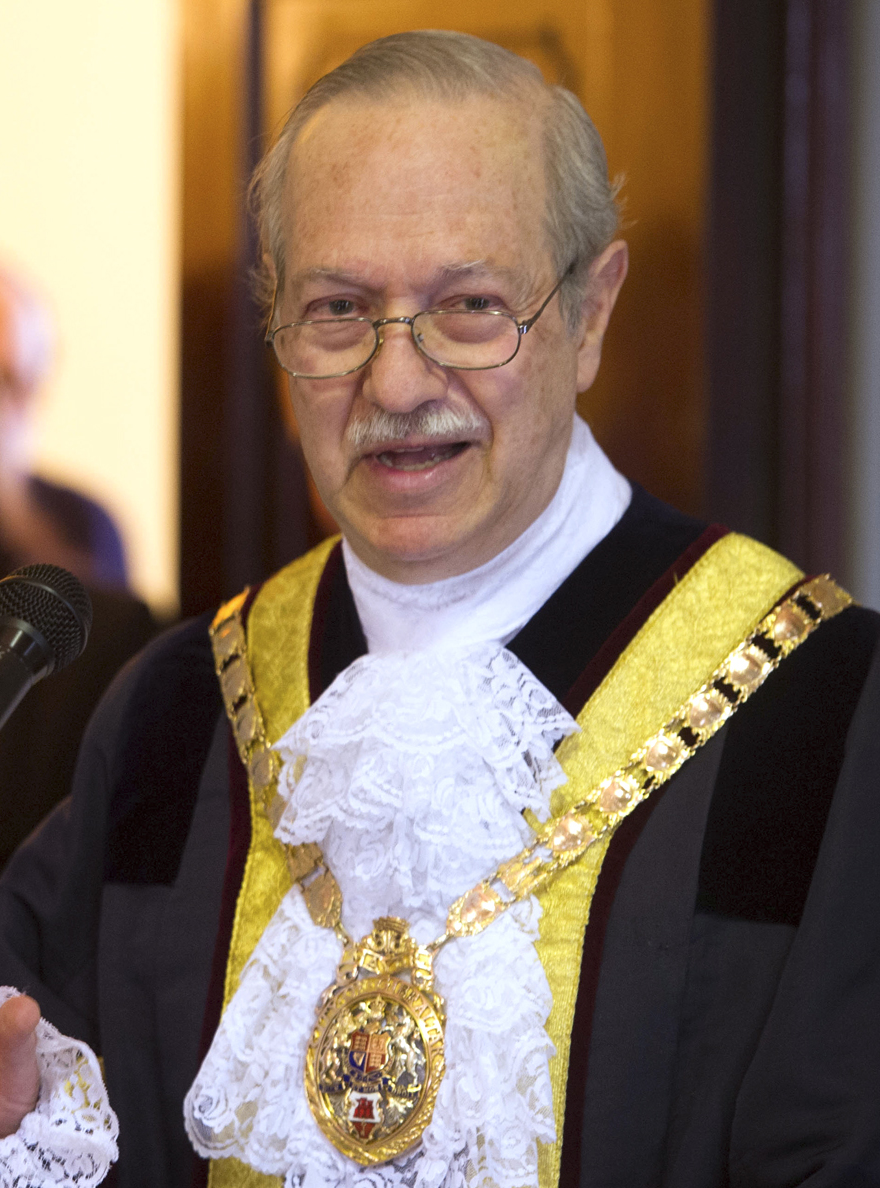

Speaker of the Gibraltar Parliament
- In office 21 December 2011 – 19 November 2019
- Preceded by: Haresh Budhrani
- Succeeded by: Melvyn Farrell

Mayor of Gibraltar
- In office 2 April 2014 – 4 April 2017
- Preceded by: Anthony Lima
- Succeeded by: Kaiane Aldorino
- In office 22 April 1976 – 31 December 1978
- Preceded by: Alfred J. Vasquez
- Succeeded by: Horace J. Zammitt

4th Chief Minister of Gibraltar
- In office 8 December 1987 – 25 March 1988
- Monarch: Elizabeth II
- Preceded by: Sir Joshua Hassan
- Succeeded by: Joe Bossano

Personal details
- Born: 17 December 1940 (age 85) London, United Kingdom
- Party: Independent; AACR
- Spouse: Julie
- Children: 3
- Profession: Teacher

Adolfo John Canepa (born 17 December 1940) is a Gibraltarian politician. He has dedicated most of his life to politics and the development of Gibraltar, having served both as Leader of the Opposition and as Chief Minister of Gibraltar from 8 December 1987 to 25 March 1988. During this period he was also the leader of the Association for the Advancement of Civil Rights (AACR). He is a former Speaker of the Gibraltar Parliament.

== Teaching career ==
Adolfo Canepa was born in London during a period of World War II when most of Gibraltar's civilian population had been evacuated. Prior to his involvement in local politics, Canepa was already well known as part of a team of teachers at the Gibraltar Grammar School who helped the Christian Brothers to mould an entire generation of Gibraltarians. He later left teaching, at considerable sacrifice for his wife Julie and young family at the time, to pursue a career in politics.

== Political career ==
Canepa was a leading member of the Association for the Advancement of Civil Rights. He was a candidate for election for the first time in the 1972 elections, winning a seat (the AACR won the majority by obtaining eight out of fifteen seats, with Joshua Hassan as Chief Minister) and thus becoming Minister for Labour and Social Security. During his time in this ministry, he led a wide-ranging review of the social security system. He later served in government as Minister for Economic Development and Trade, a ministry he held until he succeeded Hassan as Chief Minister. During Hassan's last term in government Canepa also served as Deputy Chief Minister. He was perhaps Hassan's closest political colleague and became his right-hand man at meetings in London with British prime minister Margaret Thatcher over the Dockyard Agreement and also accompanied him as his Deputy to meetings leading up to the Brussels Agreement in the early eighties.

=== Chief Minister of Gibraltar ===
Hassan resigned without completing his term as Chief Minister in 1987 after an agreement on the shared use of Gibraltar Airport was signed by Spain and the United Kingdom, citing personal reasons. Being Deputy at the time, Canepa succeeded him as Chief Minister and leader of the AACR. However, Canepa lost the 1988 elections to Joe Bossano of the Gibraltar Socialist Labour Party (GSLP), with Canepa obtaining 4,422 votes, while Bossano polled 8,128 votes. Canepa then become Leader of the Opposition until he announced his resignation just prior to the 1992 election. Canepa also announced his resignation as leader of the AACR and his retirement from politics altogether. The AACR disbanded shortly after.

=== Later work ===
Since his official retirement from politics, Canepa has assisted successive Governments of Gibraltar as a consultant, advising them by means of his experience and expertise on legislative and constitutional matters. He served in Peter Caruana's Committee on Foreign Affairs, supporting the Chief Minister in the lobbying campaign and subsequent referendum which led to the derailing of the joint sovereignty proposals in 2002, and later in the Constitutional Reform Group which led to Gibraltar's current constitution. For the last fifteen years he has worked in the Legislative Unit, the prime function of which is to scrutinise all European Union documents and determine how they might affect Gibraltar.

In October 2012, Canepa was appointed the Speaker of the Gibraltar Parliament and was the speaker up until 2019 General election.

== Mayor of Gibraltar ==
Canepa succeeded Alfred Vasquez as Mayor of Gibraltar between 1976 and 1978. He was later succeeded by Horace Zammit.

== Honours ==
On 10 December 2007 Adolfo Canepa was presented with the Gibraltar Award on behalf of the founding fathers of the AACR. The award was presented by the Self Determination for Gibraltar Group in recognition of the AACR's contribution to the political development and democratisation of Gibraltar.

In 2009, Adolfo Canepa was one of the four recipients of the Gibraltar Medallion of Honour and was therefore recorded in the Gibraltar Roll of Honour.

Civic offices
Preceded by Alfred J. Vasquez	Mayor of Gibraltar; 1976–1978	Succeeded by Horace J. Zammitt
Preceded by Anthony Lima	Mayor of Gibraltar; 2014–2017	Succeeded by Kaiane Aldorino
Political offices
Preceded by Joshua Hassan	Chief Minister of Gibraltar; 1987–1988	Succeeded by Joe Bossano

== See also ==
- List of Gibraltarians
- Politics of Gibraltar
