= Anthony Lombard =

His Worship Anthony Lombard
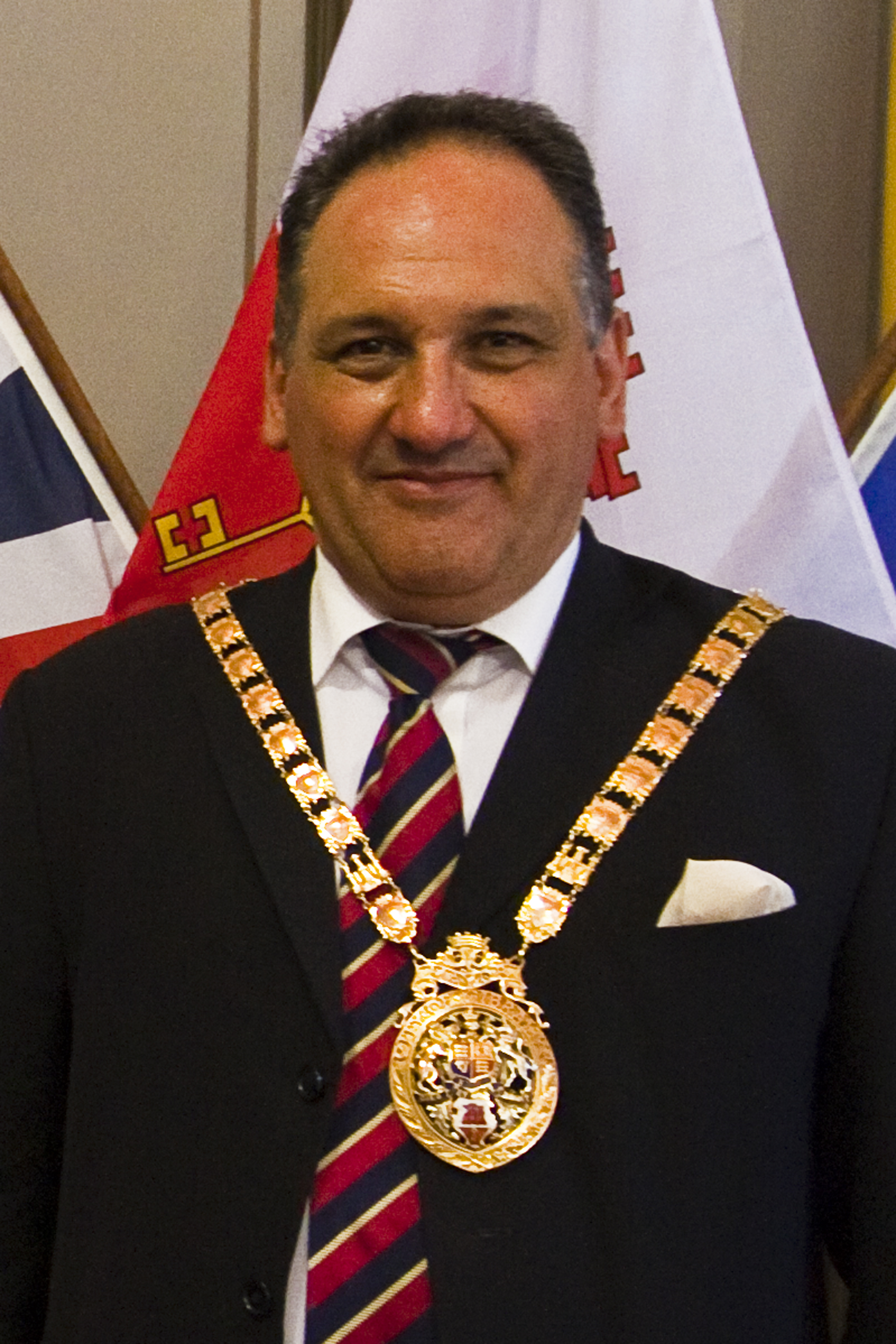
- Anthony Lombard at the Gibraltar City Hall open day, 16 July 2011.

13th Mayor of Gibraltar
- In office 1 August 2010 – 31 July 2011
- Deputy: Julio Alcantara
- Preceded by: Olga Zammit
- Succeeded by: Julio Alcantara
- Constituency: Gibraltar

2nd Deputy Mayor of Gibraltar
- In office 1 August 2009 – 31 July 2010
- Preceded by: Olga Zammit
- Succeeded by: Julio Alcantara

Personal details
- Born: Anthony J P Lombard; 30 October 1956 (age 69) Gibraltar
- Profession: Barrister; Notary public

Anthony J P Lombard LL.B., served as Mayor of Gibraltar from 1 August 2010 to 31 July 2011.

He is the honorary consul of the Republic of Poland in Gibraltar and the recipient of the Officer's Cross of the Order of Merit of the Republic of Poland.

Civic offices
Preceded by Olga Zammitt	Mayor of Gibraltar; 1 August 2010 – 31 July 2011	Succeeded by Julio Alcantara
Preceded by Olga Zammitt	Deputy Mayor of Gibraltar; 1 August 2009 – 31 July 2010	Succeeded by Julio Alcantara
