= Lakshman (name) =

Lakshman or Laxman is a common Hindu name, most commonly used as a masculine given name. It derives from Lakshmana, the character of the Ramayana epic.

== Given name ==
- Lakshmana (Chahamana dynasty), 10th century Indian king
- Lakshman, Tamil film director
- Lakshman Kadirgamar, Sri Lankan politician
- Lakshman Kiriella, Sri Lankan politician
- Laxman Narasimhan, Indian businessman, CEO-designate of Starbucks
- Lakshman Senewiratne, Sri Lankan politician
- Lakshman Sen, king of Bengal
- Laxman Rajaram, Indian chess grandmaster
- Laxman Singh, ruler of princely state of Dungarpur from 1918 to 1989
- Lakshman Singh (politician) (born 1955), Indian politician
- Lakshman Singh (scouting) (1911–1994), Indian leader in the Scout movement
- Laxman Sivaramakrishnan, Indian cricketer and commentator
- Lakshman Yapa Abeywardena, Sri Lankan politician
- Vangipurapu Venkata Sai Laxman, Indian Cricketer

== Surname ==
- Bangaru Laxman, Indian politician
- K. Laxman (born 1960), Indian politician
- R. K. Laxman (1921–2015), Indian cartoonist, illustrator, and humorist
- V. V. S. Laxman, Indian cricketer, batsman
