= John Gonçalves =

Gibraltarian politician

John Gonçalves MBE
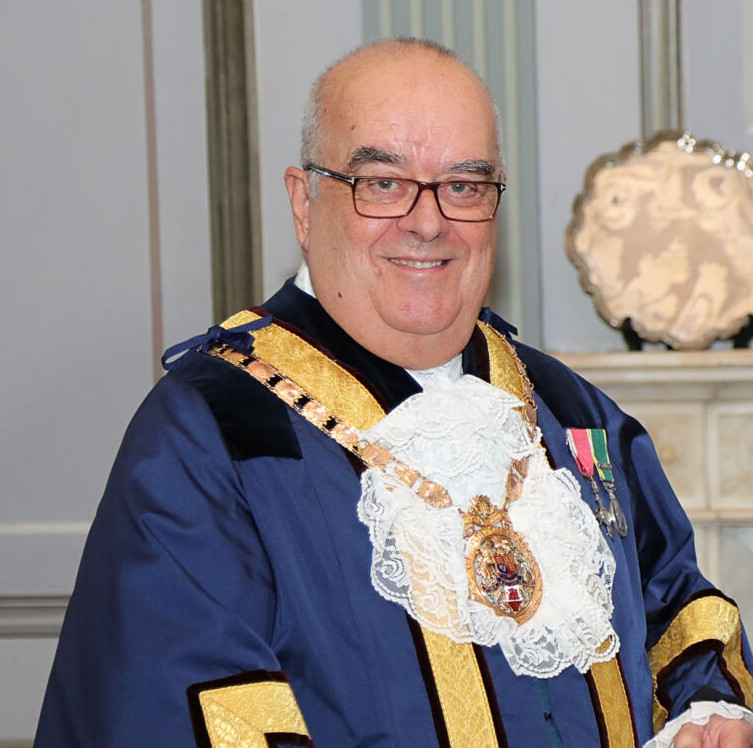

17th Mayor of Gibraltar
- In office 4 April 2019 – 1 June 2021
- Preceded by: Kaiane Aldorino
- Succeeded by: Christian Santos

John Gonçalves MBE is a Gibraltarian who served as Mayor of Gibraltar from 4 April 2019 to 1 June 2021. Prior to this, he was chairman of the Gibraltar Police Authority, from 2013 to 2018. He is also active in basketball, having been president of the Gibraltar Amateur Basketball Association since 1984, member of the board of FIBA Europe from 2003 to 2014 and 2023 to present, and Vice President of FIBA Europe from 2010 to 2014 and 2019 to 2023. Because of this, Gonçalves is sometimes known as Mr Basketball.

== Early life ==
Gonçalves had lived in Portugal with his Gibraltarian mother for a time, returning to Gibraltar after the death of his father.

== Pre-Mayoral career ==
Gonçalves has a civil service background. Having been a member of the Gibraltar Sports Advisory Committee since 1972, Gonçalves became President of the Gibraltar Amateur Basketball Association in 1984, a position he still holds as of 2025. He became a member of the board of FIBA Europe in 2003, and its vice president in 2010. Gonçalves served as General Manager of Gibraltar Airport Services from 1989 to 1992 and Chairman of Terminal Management Ltd from 1992 to 2011. In 2007 he was appointed as a Member of the British Empire. In 2013 he was voted chairman of the Gibraltar Police Authority, a role he held until 2018.

== Mayor of Gibraltar ==
On 4 April 2019 Gonçalves was invested Mayor of Gibraltar, succeeding Kaiane Aldorino. At this ceremony he was called "Mr Basketball" by Chief Minister Fabian Picardo, noting that this was the same year Gibraltar would be hosting the 2019 Island Games.

During his mayoralty, he was selected as one of three Vice Presidents of FIBA Europe.

== Post-Mayoral career ==
Gonçalves is still a member of the board of FIBA Europe as of 2025.
