= Kaiane Aldorino =

Gibraltarian politician and beauty queen

Kaiane Aldorino Lopez GMH
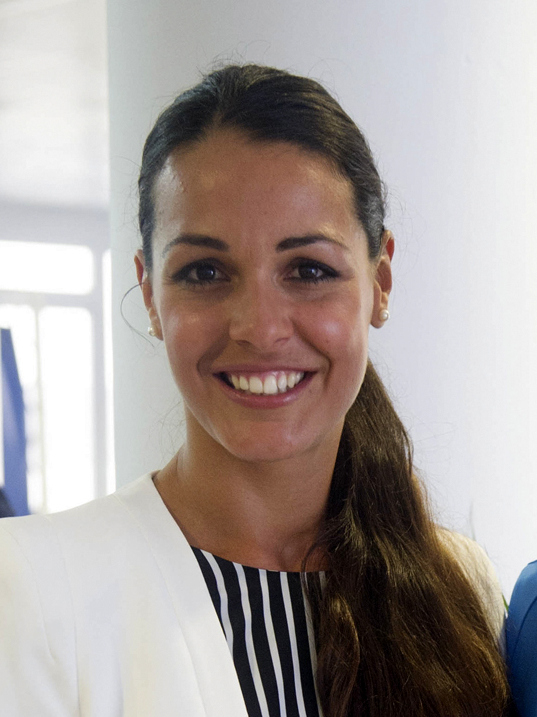
- Kaiane Aldorino on 31 May 2014

16th Mayor of Gibraltar
- In office 5 April 2017 – 4 April 2019
- Preceded by: Adolfo Canepa
- Succeeded by: John Gonçalves

Personal details
- Born: Kaiane Loise Aldorino; 8 July 1986 (age 40) Gibraltar
- Spouse: Aaron Lopez (m. 2015)
- Children: 1

Kaiane Loise Aldorino Lopez, GMH (née Aldorino; born 8 July 1986) is a Gibraltarian beauty pageant titleholder who was crowned Miss World 2009 and former mayor. From 2017 to 2019, she held the ceremonial position of Mayor of Gibraltar, after previously serving as Deputy Mayor since 2014.

Aldorino previously was a beauty pageant titleholder, being crowned Miss Gibraltar 2009, and later winning Miss World 2009 in Johannesburg, South Africa. She was the first Gibraltarian woman ever to reach the semi-finals of a major international pageant, and is the only to ever win one, as well.

== Early life and career ==
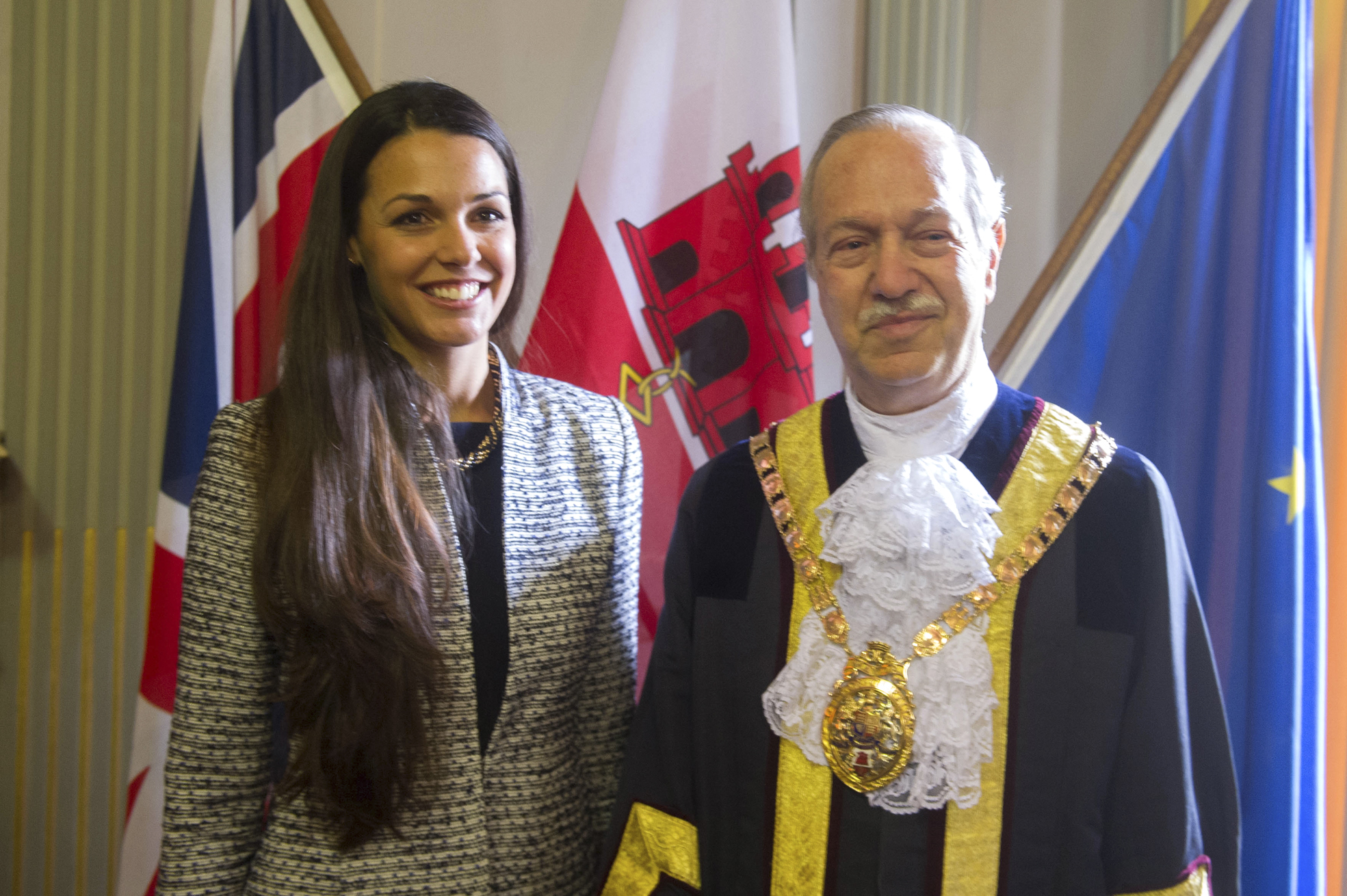
Aldorino together with Adolfo Canepa, 1 April 2014.

Aldorino was born and raised in Gibraltar. Before becoming Miss Gibraltar 2009, she had been working as a human resources clerk at St Bernard's Hospital for five years. Aldorino was raised bilingually, speaking both English and Spanish, like most Gibraltarians.

Aldorino began dancing at the age of 14 with Urban Dance Group. She participated at the 2008 International Dance Organization World Showdance Championships, in Riesa, Germany, where she represented Gibraltar in the Formation category as part of the Gibraltar National Dance Team. They placed 17th, and made history by being the first Gibraltarian formation team to pass the first round.

Aldorino married fellow Gibraltarian Aaron Lopez in June 2015. They have one daughter, born in 2016.

== Pageants ==
=== Miss Gibraltar 2009 ===
On 27 June 2009, Aldorino was crowned Miss Gibraltar 2009, succeeding Krystle Robba at the Alameda Open Air Theatre.

=== Miss World 2009 ===
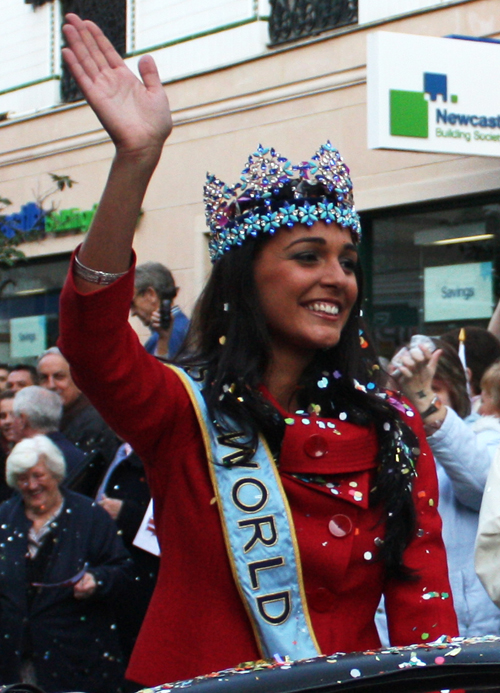
Miss World 2009 during her homecoming celebrations in Gibraltar, 17 December 2009.

Aldorino made history on 12 December 2009, by becoming the first ever Miss Gibraltar to be crowned Miss World. She was also the first Gibraltarian contestant to have reached the semi-finals of one of the major international pageants after receiving the title of Miss World Beach Beauty.

Shortly after Aldorino was crowned by her predecessor, Ksenia Sukhinova of Russia, Gibraltar burst into celebration as many Gibraltarians took to the streets. Supporters waved the flag of Gibraltar, chanted as cars honked their horns, and fireworks were set off. Chief Minister of Gibraltar Peter Caruana hailed her win as a "wonderful achievement for her and for Gibraltar" and promised a "homecoming fit for a queen". In 2010, she was guest judge in the final Mister World 2010 beauty pageant in Incheon, South Korea.

During her reign, Lopez travelled to over 40 countries. Some of these countries include: United Arab Emirates, Japan, Brunei, Hong Kong, Canada, United States, Spain, Germany, Korea, Italy, Indonesia, South Africa, Ireland, and China.

==== Homecoming ====
On 15 December 2009, HM Government of Gibraltar announced Aldorino would be flown into Gibraltar from London on a private jet the following afternoon. On 16 December 2009, the government issued a press release in which it detailed the events that would take place upon Aldorino's arrival. These included a public greeting at Gibraltar Airport, a parade through Main Street where Aldorino would ride in the same convertible car as Diana, Princess of Wales and Prince Charles during their honeymoon visit to Gibraltar. On 17 December 2009, Aldorino paraded down Main Street preceded by the band of the Royal Gibraltar Regiment, and then appeared at the City Hall balcony. This was followed by a press conference and reception at the Rock Hotel. The celebrations culminated with a fireworks display from Gibraltar Harbour. The Government also requested all businesses in Gibraltar who were reasonably able to do so to close between 4 pm and 6 pm on this day to allow their staff to take part in the welcoming celebrations.

== Mayor of Gibraltar ==
In March 2014, Aldorino was appointed deputy to the Mayor of Gibraltar, Adolfo Canepa, as a result of a motion by the Chief Minister Fabian Picardo, passed by the Parliament.

On 4 April 2017, she became the mayor of the territory. Among her first acts as mayor were opening a website and social media accounts for the position and creating photo albums for visitors of the Mayor's Office.

In May 2018 she donated ten thousand dollars received from the Miss World Organization to the Rainbow Ward at St Bernard's Hospital and St Martin's School. A "twinning ceremony" was held on 11 September 2018, between Gibraltar and Jamaica, hosted by Aldorino and attended by Mayor of Kingston Delroy Williams. In February 2019 a delegation, including Aldorino, Steven Linares, and Charles Azzopardi, to Jamaica, with the purpose of consolidating the "twinning agreement". During this visit Aldorino received the keys to the city of Kingston.

She was succeeded in her role as mayor on 4 April 2019 by John Gonçalves.

== Awards ==
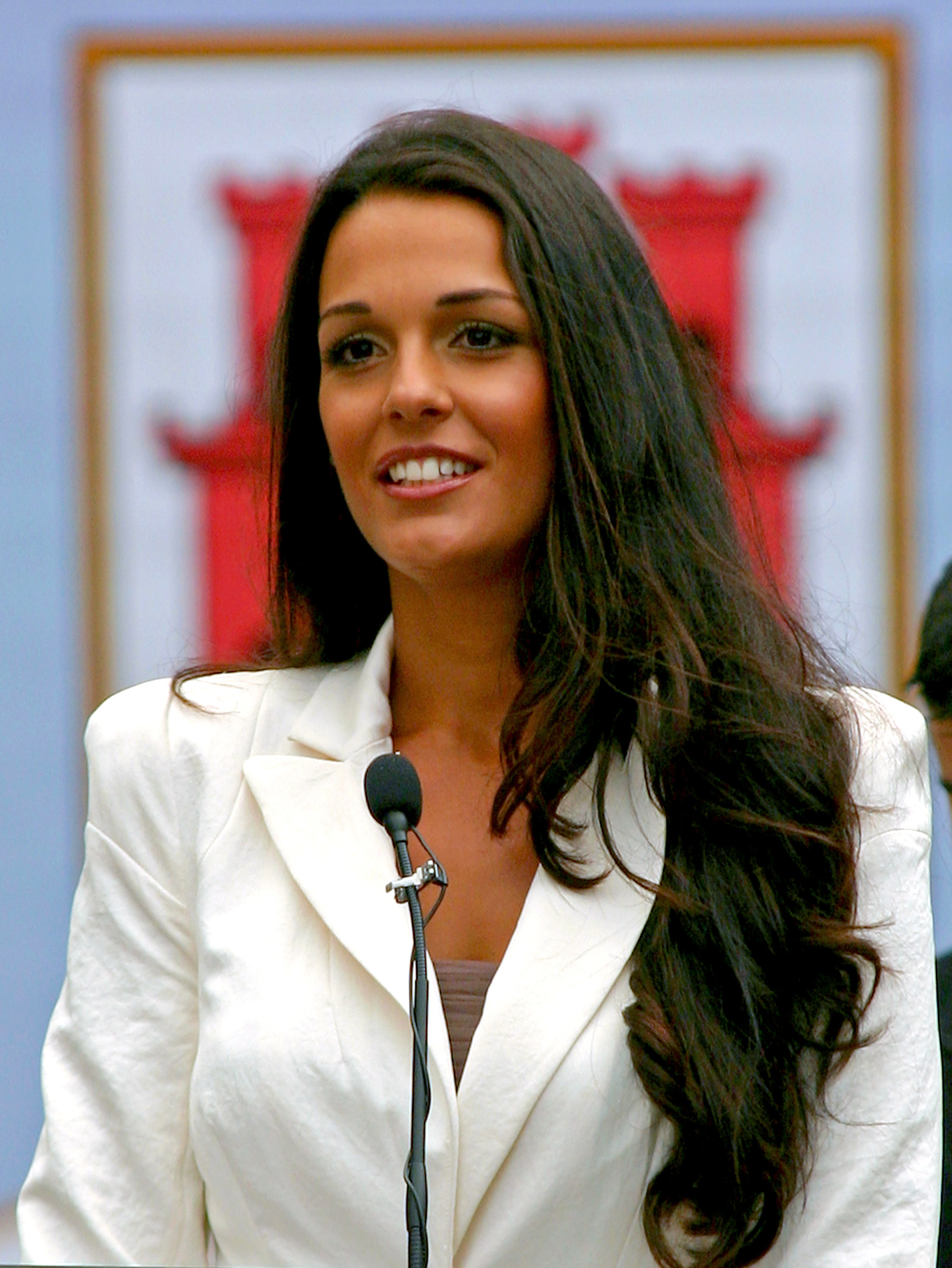
Kaiane Aldorino on 15 September 2011

On 7 July 2011, Aldorino was awarded with both the Freedom of the City of Gibraltar and the Gibraltar Medallion of Honour by a unanimous vote in the Gibraltar Parliament. The motion which was tabled by Chief Minister of Gibraltar Peter Caruana recognised her:

extraordinary personal achievement in becoming Miss World 2009 and … the enormous pride and global recognition that her achievement has represented for Gibraltar as a whole.

Aldorino became the first woman to receive the Freedom of the City in Gibraltar.

Awards and achievements
Preceded by (Russia) Ksenia Sukhinova	Miss World; 2009	Succeeded by (United States) Alexandria Mills
Preceded by (Russia) Ksenia Sukhinova	Miss World Europe; 2009	Succeeded by (Republic of Ireland) Emma Britt Waldron
Preceded by (Mexico) Anagabriela Espinoza	Miss World Beach Beauty; 2009	Succeeded by (Puerto Rico) Yara Lasanta
Preceded by Krystle Robba	Miss Gibraltar; 2009	Succeeded by Larissa Dalli
