= Clive Beltran =

Gibraltarian politician (born 1949)

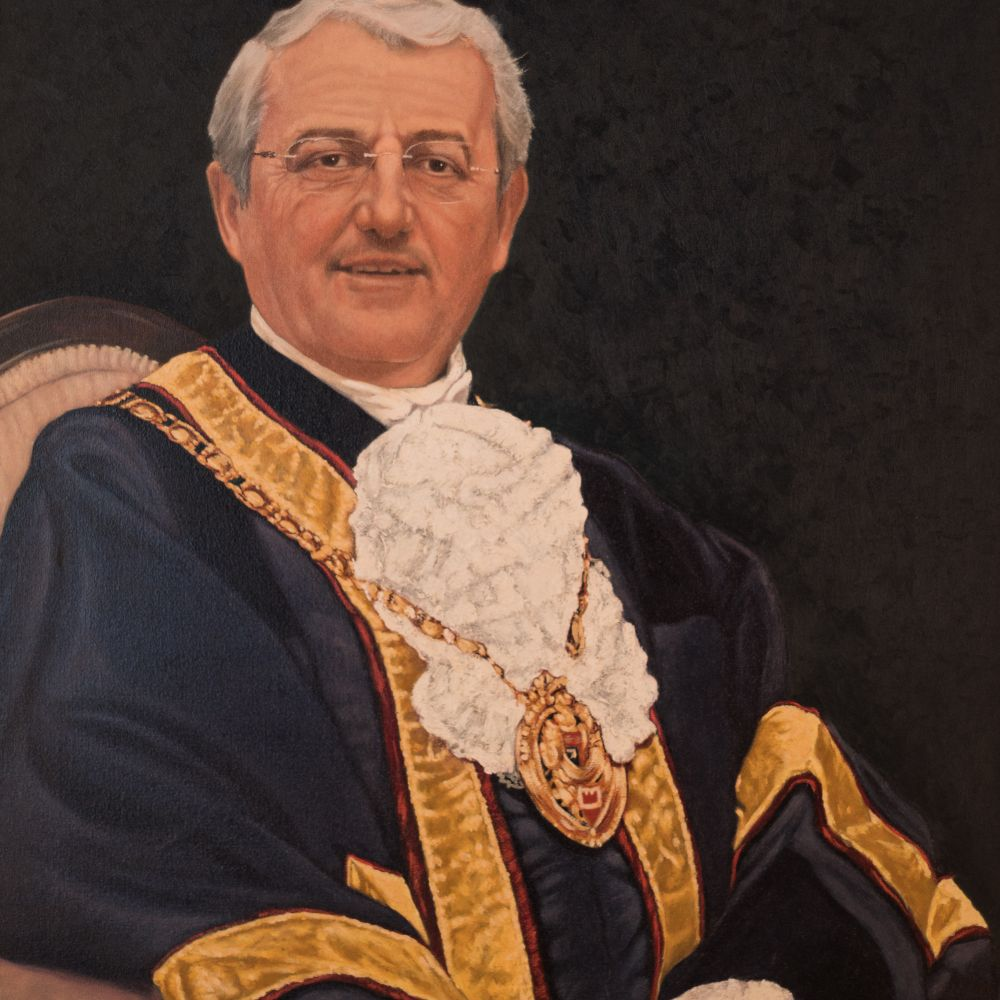
- Born: 18 October 1949 (age 76)
- Occupations: Teacher, politician
- Political party: Gibraltar Social Democrats

Clive Beltran (born 18 October 1949) is a Gibraltarian former teacher, politician and Minister of the Government of Gibraltar for the Gibraltar Social Democrats. He was principal of the Gibraltar College in 2002–2003, and was elected to the then Gibraltar House of Assembly (later became the Gibraltar Parliament) Minister for Education and Training in November 2003. Beltran retired from his position in 2011 after having served eight years in government. He also served a four-year term as Mayor of Gibraltar.
