= Olga Zammitt =

Mayor of Gibraltar

Her Worship Olga Zammitt OBE, JP
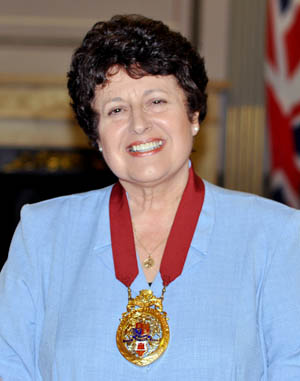
- Olga Zammitt at the Mayor's Parlour, City Hall.

12th Mayor of Gibraltar
- In office 1 August 2009 – 31 July 2010
- Deputy: Anthony Lombard
- Preceded by: Solomon Levy
- Succeeded by: Anthony Lombard
- Constituency: Gibraltar

1st Deputy Mayor of Gibraltar
- In office 1 August 2008 – 31 July 2009
- Succeeded by: Anthony Lombard

Personal details
- Born: 31 August 1940 (age 85) Gibraltar
- Spouse: Leslie Zammit
- Profession: Teacher

Olga Mercedes Zammitt (born 31 August 1940) is a retired Gibraltarian teacher and former Mayor of Gibraltar. She held office from 1 August 2009 to 31 July 2010.

Zammitt was appointed Officer of the Order of the British Empire (OBE) in the 2011 Birthday Honours for services to the community in Gibraltar.

Civic offices
Preceded by Solomon Levy	Mayor of Gibraltar; 1 August 2009 – 31 July 2010	Succeeded by Anthony Lombard
New creation	Deputy Mayor of Gibraltar; 1 August 2008 – 31 July 2009	Succeeded by Anthony Lombard
