= Mayor of Gibraltar =

Ceremonial official

- Incumbent; Nicky Guerrero since 16 December 2025
- Style: His Worship
- Residence: Gibraltar City Hall
- Appointer: Parliament
- Inaugural holder: Sir Joshua Hassan
- Deputy: Andrea Simpson
- Salary: None
- Website: http://www.mayor.gi/

The mayor of Gibraltar is the ceremonial official of the British overseas territory of Gibraltar. The mayor is appointed by the elected members of Parliament, and the office is situated at City Hall John Mackintosh Square. Since 16 June 2025, Nicky Guerrero succeeded Carmen Gomez (theatre actress, author and Miss Gibraltar 1970) for the role.

== History ==
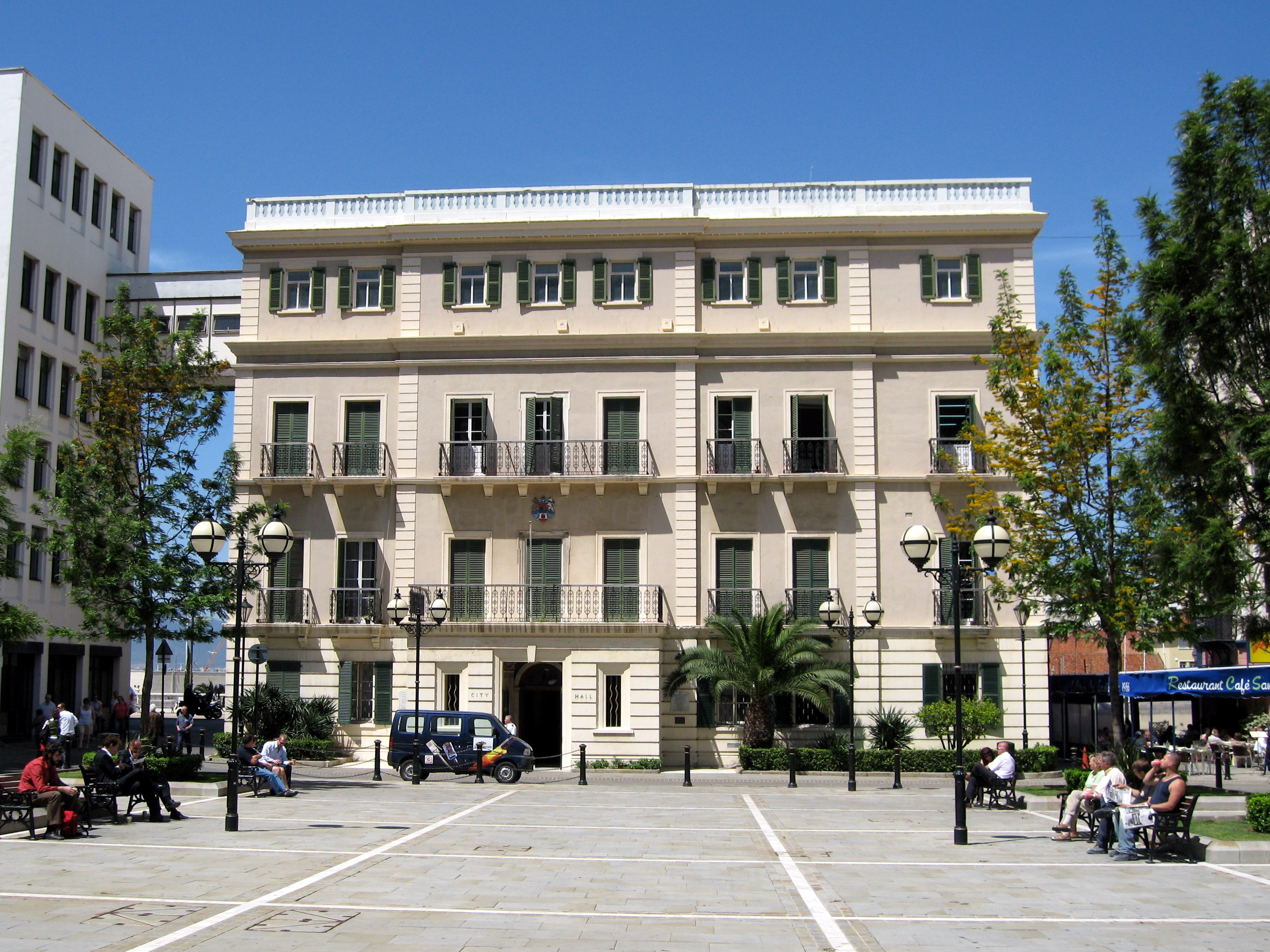
Centrally situated at John Mackintosh Square, opposite the Gibraltar Parliament, the Gibraltar City Hall is the office of the mayor of Gibraltar.

Since its creation in 1921, the city council had a chairman. In 1955, upon request of the members of the city council, the post was renamed to mayor, and therefore, the mayor of Gibraltar was chosen from among the members of the council. Joshua Hassan, MVO, QC, JP, the chairman of the city council at the time, became the first mayor of Gibraltar.

=== 1969 Constitution ===
The City Council was abolished when the new Gibraltar Constitution Order in Council came into effect in 1969. However, the mayor of Gibraltar survived, but only with a ceremonial character, and was to be elected by the House of Assembly (later the Parliament). This meant that office was invariably taken by the speaker or a government minister.

The 1969 Constitution stated:

A person elected to the office of Mayor shall hold office upon such terms and conditions, and shall perform such functions (being ceremonial functions of a civic character), as may be determined by the Governor, acting after consultation with the Gibraltar Council.

=== 2006 Constitution ===
Following the new 2006 Constitution, the mayor no longer had to be chosen from among the members of Parliament. Instead, the mayor is appointed by Parliament. The intention was to move to a new system whereby citizens from the community at large can be appointed mayor for a one-year period, although this can sometimes be for longer. The Government of Gibraltar announced that a deputy mayor would also be appointed for the same period and would then take up the office of mayor.

== Appointment ==
The mayor of Gibraltar is appointed by Parliament but not from within Parliament, and is to hold the position for a minimum one-year period. As per the 2006 Constitution:

A person elected to the office of Mayor shall hold office upon such terms and conditions, and shall perform such functions (being ceremonial functions of a civic character), as may be determined by the Parliament.

=== Deputy ===
A deputy mayor is at the same time appointed by Parliament for one year to assist and support the mayor in the discharge of mayoral duties, as well as to act as mayor when she or he is unable to participate in a civic event. The deputy will take office as mayor the following year and a new deputy appointed, and so on.

== Duties ==
Since 1969, the duties of the mayor are entirely ceremonial and civic. The posts of mayor and deputy mayor of Gibraltar are honorific and thus unpaid.

== List of mayors ==
The following is a list of all the mayors of Gibraltar since the first tenure began in 1955:

No.	Image	Name	Took office	Left office
1	The Hon. Sir Joshua A. Hassan	The Hon. Sir Joshua Hassan CBE MVO QC JP	23 February 1955	2 June 1969
2		The Hon. Col. William Thompson OBE JP	2 June 1969	6 November 1970
3		The Hon. Alfred J. Vasquez CBE MA	6 November 1970	22 April 1976
4	The Hon. Adolfo J. Canepa	The Hon. Adolfo J. Canepa Esq	22 April 1976	31 December 1978
5		The Hon. Horace J. Zammitt Esq	1 January 1979	31 July 1979
6		The Hon. Abraham W. Serfaty CBE JP	1 August 1979	31 July 1988
7		The Hon. Mari I. Montegriffo	1 August 1988	20 March 1995
8		The Hon. Robert Mor Esq	20 March 1995	31 July 1996
9		Judge John E. Alcantara CBE	1 August 1996	31 July 2004
10		The Hon. Clive G. Beltran MP	1 August 2004	31 July 2008
11	Solomon Levy MBE, JP	Solomon 'Momy' Levy, MBE, JP	1 August 2008	31 July 2009
12	Olga Zammitt, OBE, JP	Olga Zammitt OBE, JP	1 August 2009	31 July 2010
13	Anthony Lombard	Anthony J P Lombard LL.B.	1 August 2010	31 July 2011
14	Julio Alcantara	Julio Alcantara MBE MA	1 August 2011	31 July 2012
15	Anthony Lima	Anthony Lima MBE RD RNR Retd.	1 August 2012	31 July 2014
16	The Hon. Adolfo J. Canepa	The Hon. Adolfo J. Canepa OBE GMH MP	1 August 2014	4 April 2017
17	Kaiane Lopez	Kaiane Aldorino GMH	5 April 2017	4 April 2019
18		John Gonçalves MBE GMD	4 April 2019	1 June 2021
19		Christian Santos GMD	1 June 2021	6 June 2023
20		Carmen Gomez	6 June 2023	16 December 2025
21		Nicky Guerrero	16 December 2025	Incumbent

=== List of Deputy Mayors (since 2008) ===
- Olga Zammitt (2008–2009)
- Anthony Lombard (2009–2010)
- Julio Alcantara (2010–2011)
- Anthony “Tony” Lima (2011–2012)
- Kaiane Aldorino (2014–2017)
- John Gonçalves (2017–2019)
- Christian Santos (2019–2021)
- Carmen Gomez (2021–2023)
- Nicholas “Nicky” Guerrero (2023–2025)
- Andrea Simpson (2025–present)
