= Speaker of the Gibraltar Parliament =

Presiding officer of the Gibraltar Parliament

- Coat of arms of Gibraltar
- Incumbent; Karen Ramagge Prescott since 10 November 2023
- Style: Mrs Speaker (within Parliament); The Honourable (formal)
- Residence: Parliament House
- Appointer: Gibraltar Parliament
- Term length: At His Majesty's pleasure (elected by the Commons at the start of each Parliament, and upon a vacancy)
- Inaugural holder: William Thompson
- Salary: £55,982 (per annum)

The Speaker of the Gibraltar Parliament is the presiding officer of the Gibraltar Parliament, the legislature of the British Overseas Territory of Gibraltar. The current Speaker is Karen Ramagge Prescott, who succeeded Melvynn Farell on 10 November 2023 to become the first female to take the role.

== List of Speakers ==
=== Speakers of the Legislative Council ===
A Legislative Council, the predecessor of the parliament, was inaugurated on 23 November 1950. A Speaker was appointed in 1958.

| Name | Period |
|---|---|
| Presidents (The Governor of Gibraltar): | 1950–1958 |
| General Sir Kenneth Anderson, KCB, MC | 1950–1952 |
| General Sir Gordon MacMillan, KCB, CBE, DSO, MC | 1952–1955 |
| Lieutenant General Sir Harold Redman, KCB, CBE | 1955–1958 |
| Speakers | 1958–1969 |
| Major Joseph Patron OBE, MC, JP | 1958–1964 |
| William Thompson, OBE, JP | 1964–1969 |

=== Speakers of the Gibraltar Parliament ===
Between 1969 and 2007 the Gibraltar Parliament was styled as the House of Assembly.

| Image | Name | Term | Parliaments |
|---|---|---|---|
| | Colonel William Thompson, OBE, JP | 1969–1970 | 1st |
| | Sir Alfred Vasquez, CBE, QC | 1970–1992 | 1st 2nd 3rd 4th 5th 6th |
| | Robert Peliza, OBE, ED | 1992–1996 | 7th |
| | John Alcantara, CBE | 1996–2007 | 8th 9th 10th |
| | Haresh Budhrani, KC | 11 October 2007 – 9 December 2011 | 11th |
| | Adolfo Canepa, GMH, OBE | 21 December 2011 – 19 November 2019 | 12th 13th |
| | Melvyn Farrell, BEM, GMD, RD, JP | 19 November 2019 – 10 November 2023 | 14th |
| | Karen Ramagge Prescott, GMH, JP | 10 November 2023–present | 15th |
