= Culture of Gibraltar =

The culture of Gibraltar reflects Gibraltarians' diverse origins. While there are Spanish and British influences, a result of the territory's status as a British overseas territory and its proximity to Spain, the ethnic origins of most Gibraltarians are a mix of Andalusian Spaniards, Genoese, Maltese, Portuguese and British. The main religion is Christianity, the majority group being the Roman Catholic Church, then the Church of England. There is a long established Sephardic Jewish community, a number of Hindu Indians and a Moroccan Muslim population. Gibraltarians of Genoese origin came to The Rock in the 18th century, with the Maltese and Portuguese following in the 19th century, coming to work and trade in the British military base. Spanish Andalusian origins are the result of generations of intermarriage with inhabitants of surrounding towns.

During the Second World War, the whole civilian population of The Rock was evacuated by the British government, which decreed that "the fortress comes first". They were moved to the United Kingdom, particularly to Fulham and Kensington in London and Ballymena in Northern Ireland, as well as Jamaica and Madeira. This served to strengthen a Gibraltarian, as opposed to simply British, identity, and after the war, there was a successful campaign for repatriation.

== Cultural relationships with United Kingdom and Spain ==
=== British Gibraltarians ===
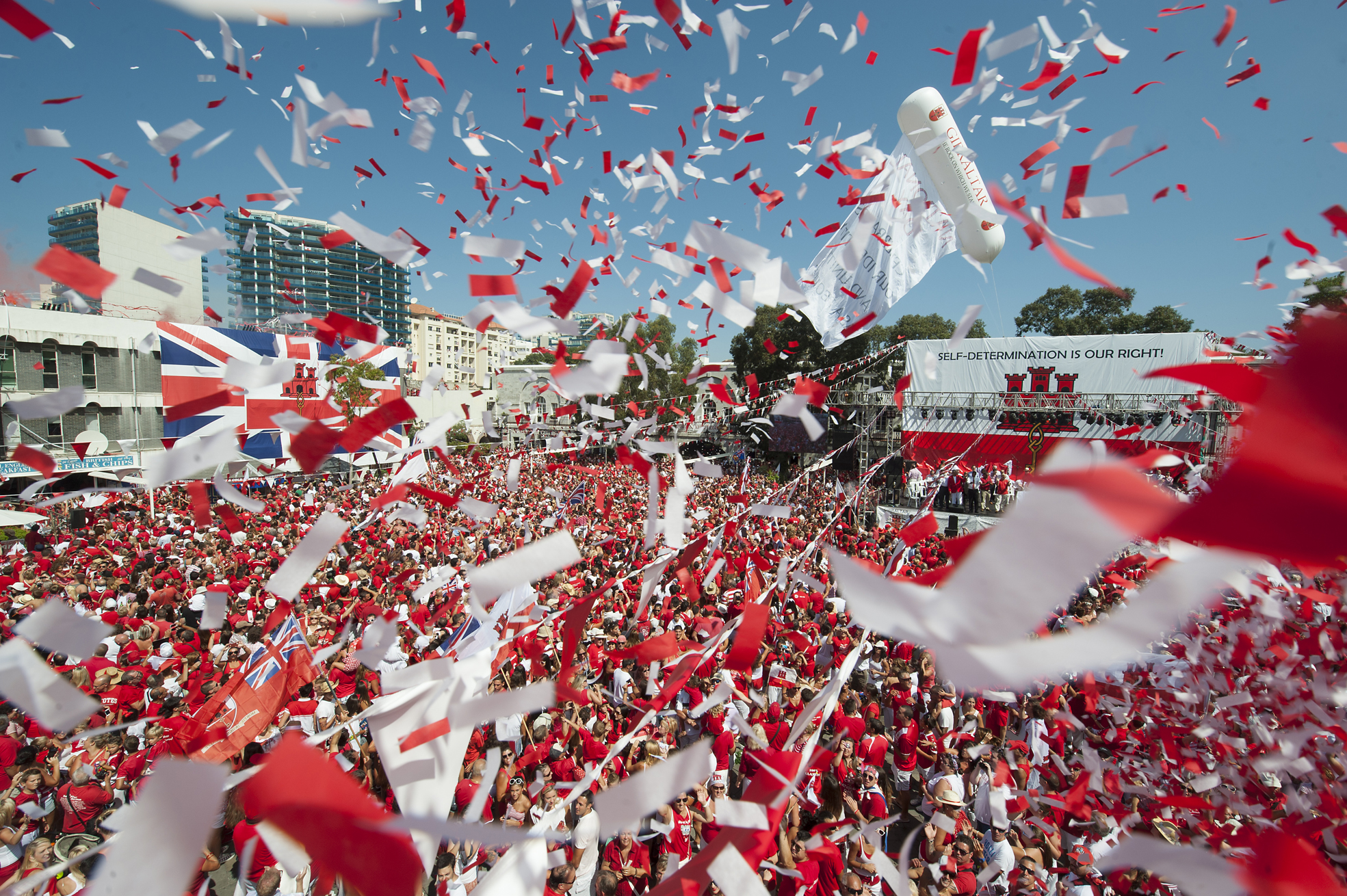
Thousands of Gibraltarians dress in their national colours of red and white and fill Grand Casemates Square during the 2013 Gibraltar National Day celebrations

Gibraltarians have historically been proud of their British heritage, and unlike the inhabitants of other territories, sought to strengthen, rather than loosen their ties with the UK and the British Crown, seeing themselves as "more British than the British". This sense of being British was particularly strong when the frontier with Spain was closed in 1969, and all communications links were severed. Until 16 December 2006, the only flights from Gibraltar Airport, were those to the UK. The fact that they are largely of Mediterranean appearance and speak an Andalusian Spanish variant, known as Llanito gives Gibraltarians a strong resemblance to Andalusian Spaniards, despite the Gibraltarian's distinct cultural heritage and identity.

=== Religion ===
Most Gibraltarians are Roman Catholic, with the Diocese of Gibraltar being directly responsible to the Vatican. The Rock also forms part of the Church of England diocese covering mainland Europe, with a "Bishop of Gibraltar in Europe". There is also a Methodist Church. The former St Andrew's Church (part of the Church of Scotland) closed in 2022.

There is a small (800 members) but very influential Jewish minority, active in business and politics, and five synagogues. Most Moroccans are Muslim, and there is a large mosque at Europa Point, the Ibrahim-al-Ibrahim Mosque, paid for by Saudi Arabia. Most Indians are Hindu, with their own local temple.

Additionally there are two very active congregations of Jehovah's Witnesses sharing the same Kingdom Hall; one has meetings in English and the other in Spanish.

=== Relations with Spain ===
Historically, cultural ties with Spain have been strong; a variant of Andalusian Spanish, "Llanito", being the vernacular language of the territory. Intermarriage between Gibraltarians and Spaniards resulted in many people having relatives on the other side of the frontier, known in Spanish as La Verja or 'the fence'. These people were badly affected by the closure of the frontier in 1969, which even saw telephone links severed, so that the only way that families could communicate was to shout across the border gates. Others took the more cumbersome and costly route of travelling first from Gibraltar to Tangiers by ferry and then taking another ferry to Algeciras, before taking a final coach to La Línea de la Concepción. A journey that would take half a day, when the end destination would have been within walking distance under normal circumstances.

Since the frontier with Spain was reopened, ties with the hinterland, known as the "Campo de Gibraltar", have increased, with many buying property in places like La Línea de la Concepción, where prices are considerably lower, Sotogrande and even further afield like the Costa del Sol. On the weekends, many flock across the frontier, with livelier nightclubs and bars than in Gibraltar. Younger Gibraltarians have considerable exposure to popular culture from Spain, and even vice versa, the pop group "Taxi" having found success on the Spanish charts, virtually all of its songs being in Spanish. In addition, Gibraltarians of all ages are often avid supporters of Spanish football teams like FC Barcelona and Real Madrid C.F. as well as English teams such as Manchester United F.C. and Arsenal F.C.

However, the Gibraltar Football Association's application for membership of UEFA, which would enable it to participate in the European Football Championships and the Football World Cup, has met with strong opposition from the Royal Spanish Football Federation. This is seen as yet another attempt to deny the existence of Gibraltar internationally.

While Gibraltarians have multiple identities, seeing themselves to varying degrees as Gibraltarian, British and European, they do not generally identify with the Spanish state. While some in Britain's Foreign Office would like to see this closening of ties result in an 'osmosis' between The Rock and the "Campo de Gibraltar", there is no prospect of Gibraltarians accepting absorption into Spain. A trip across the frontier, even to La Línea, is still described as "going to Spain".

=== Relations with Britain ===
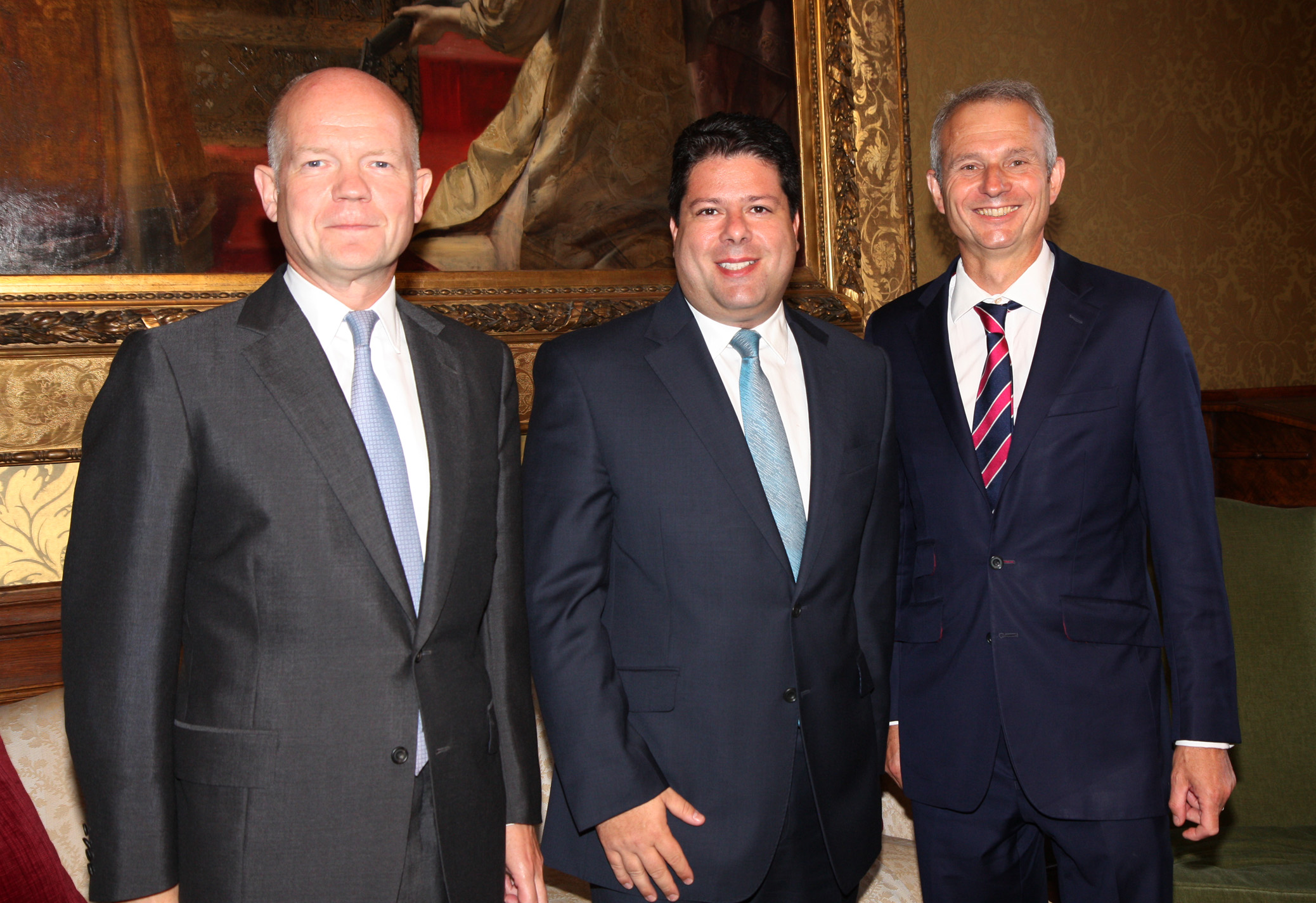
Foreign Secretary William Hague and Minister for Europe David Lidington with Chief Minister of Gibraltar Fabian Picardo at a meeting in London, 28 August 2013

British influence remains strong. Spanish may be widely spoken, but it is mainly used as a vernacular language, English being the only official language used in government, commerce, education and the media. Gibraltarians going on to higher education attend university in the UK and not in Spain. Many university graduates remain in the UK to pursue careers there. After the Second World War, most evacuees were repatriated, but some stayed on, while many also moved to the UK, thereby increasing family ties with the "mother country". While television from Spain is easily received and widely watched, the availability of British television via satellite, particularly Sky and the BBC, means that Gibraltarians are as familiar with British news and popular culture as people in the UK itself.

== Surnames ==
Many Gibraltarians have names that reflect their mixed British and Mediterranean heritage usually with British first names like Keith, Kyle, Nigel, James, John, Marie, Natalie, Samantha, etc. with surnames originating from all over the Mediterranean and beyond. Surnames in Gibraltar include those originating from:

(Italy) Genoa

E.g. Alecio, Bossano, Bottaro, Canessa, Cavilla, Culatto, Danino, Devincenzi, Felice, Ferrary, Ferro, Galliano, Imossi, Isola, Lavarello, Licudi, Massetti, Montegriffo, Olivero, Parody, Passano, Pitaluga, Pitto, Pizzarello, Povedano, Ramo, Risso, Sciacaluga, Stagnetto

India

E.g. Aswani, Budhrani, Karnani, Kumar, Mahtani

Malta

E.g. Agius, Attard, Azzopardi, Borg, Buhagiar, Buttigieg, Calleja, Canepa, Camilleri, Caruana, Debono, Farrugia, Mifsud, Robba, Sant, Spiteri, Teuma, Xerri, Zammit

Portugal

E.g. Britto, Coelho, Correia, Gonçalves, Mascarenhas, Netto, Oliveira, Tavares

Sephardic Jewish

E.g. Abudarham, Attias, Belilo, Benady, Benamor, Benyunes, Cohen, Federico, Gabay, Hassan, Levy, Serfaty, Serruya, Wahnon

Spain

E.g. Borrell, Garcia, Gomez, Gonzalez, Lopez, Linares, Mañasco, Martinez, Ocaña, Ramirez, Reyes, Rodriguez, Sanchez, Santos, Vallejo, Vinent, Perez, Hernandez, Moreno, Sevilla, Diaz, Romero, Navarro, Torres, Fernandez, Vasquez

United Kingdom

E.g. Corby, Crisp, Feetham, Finlayson, Francis, Hook, Holmes, Jones, Randall, Richardson, Tewkesbury, Neish, McKnight

(Republic of Ireland) Irish

E.g. FitzGerald, Byrne, McCarthy

== 'Gibraltarian' vs 'People of Gibraltar' ==
=== Gibraltarian British ===
While many outsiders use the terms 'Gibraltarians', 'people of Gibraltar' and 'residents of Gibraltar' interchangeably, strictly speaking, 'Gibraltarian' should be used only to describe those British citizens registered as having Gibraltarian status.

The UK originally regarded Gibraltarians as British Overseas Territories citizens (BOTC). In 1981 Gibraltarians successfully campaigned against this classification under the British Nationality Act, which would have deprived them of the right of abode in the UK, along with other colonial subjects. This was partly due to Gibraltar's status as part of the then European Community (now European Union). As a result, the Gibraltarians acquired the right to register as full British citizens.

British passports issued in Gibraltar differ from those issued in the UK, in that they feature on the cover the word "Gibraltar" underneath "United Kingdom of Great Britain and Northern Ireland". Whereas UK-issued passports state that "Her Britannic Majesty's Secretary of State requests and requires in the name of Her Majesty the Queen to allow the bearer to pass freely without let or hindrance", Gibraltar-issued passports state that it is the Governor of Gibraltar who requests and requires this.

In 2004 an electoral register taken for the purposes of elections for the European Parliament showed that there were only 95 persons with the status of BOTC. Spain opposed the enfranchisement of the Gibraltarians in EU elections on the basis of the misconception that Gibraltarians were not full British citizens, but Commonwealth citizens, despite Commonwealth citizens living in the UK having always been able to vote in European elections.

=== Other British ===
There is a sizeable British expatriate minority, classified as 'Other British' and sometimes referred to by the native Gibraltarians rather pejoratively as guiris. Historically, many came with the British military or as civil servants, with many marrying locals, and registering as Gibraltarians themselves, although any British citizen resident on The Rock for at least six months may vote. With the decline of the military presence, and the introduction of self-government, most from the UK instead come to work in the offshore finance sector. Many affluent people from the UK and elsewhere are classed as "High Net Worth Individuals", who receive tax concessions in return for buying property and residing locally for at least part of the year. More recently, many futures traders have come to the Rock, since the London International Financial Futures and Options Exchange (LIFFE) switched to electronic trading in 1999, thereby reducing the need to be in London. Some in Gibraltar have criticised the current government's policy, on the grounds that too much is being done to develop luxury properties for 'High Net Worth Individuals', and not enough to develop property for local people, a common complaint in many other small offshore jurisdictions. However, this should not be construed as hostility to British people or expatriates.

=== Moroccans ===
Following the closure of the frontier, Gibraltar could no longer rely on Spanish workers commuting from the Campo, resulting in a labour shortage. Gibraltar instead looked to Morocco, with many workers coming over by ferry and staying in government hostels. Although they paid income tax and social insurance, they were denied the right to either permanent residence or citizenship, only having renewable work permits. This policy has prompted criticism from human rights groups in the UK, who describe living and working conditions for Moroccans in Gibraltar as degrading.

=== Indians ===
Most Indians in Gibraltar are in business, many of the shops on the Rock's Main Street being Indian-owned. Initially not able to obtain citizenship, an increasing number have done so.

== Sport ==
The Ministry for Sport, headed by the Hon Edwin Reyes, Minister for Sport and Culture, is responsible for sports policy matters and the provision of support to educational establishments and the governing bodies of sport in Gibraltar. Under the chairmanship of the Minister, a Gibraltar Sports Advisory Council has been set up to advise the Government of Gibraltar on all matters relating to sport.

The Government recognises the benefits derived from participation in sports and recreational activities. Importance is given to the availability of suitable facilities for the practice of sport. There are a large number of Sports facilities in Gibraltar, of varying standards. These provide opportunities for residents and visitors alike to enjoy sport as a recreation and for the serious sports enthusiasts to improve standards and participate in local and International events.

There are, at the moment, eighteen Gibraltar Sports Associations that have gained official recognition from their respective International Governing Bodies. Others, including the Gibraltar National Olympic Committee, have submitted applications for recognition which are being considered.

In late 1999 a Sports Development Unit was set up to assist Gibraltar governing bodies of sport and Educational establishments to improve standards.

Gibraltar's resident population is active in sport and standards are, by and large, rather high, in relation to Gibraltar's population. Participation in officially recognised or other sports events, abroad or in Gibraltar, is welcomed by Gibraltar sports persons.

Gibraltar's sports facilities are also being used by foreign sports persons for 'warm-weather' training. This practice is being encouraged and more and better facilities are projected to improve the product for locals and visitors alike.

=== The Gibraltar Football Association ===
The GFA was formed as the Gibraltar Civilian Football Association in 1895, changing to its current name in later years. It is one of the oldest football associations in the world.

The GFA was formed as an increasing number of football clubs were coming into existence in Gibraltar, and the association was designed to bring some form of organisation to the game there. Between the association's formation and 1907 the only football competition in Gibraltar was the Merchant's Cup. However, in 1907 the GFA established a league to complement the existing cup competition.

By 1901, the GFA had established a representative "national" team, competing against military teams. This representative team continued to play down the years, their highlight probably being a draw against Real Madrid in 1949.

The GFA affiliated with The Football Association in 1909, but is currently trying to become a full member of UEFA so that its national team can compete in the European Football Championship and the Football World Cup.

=== Gibraltar Football League ===
The Gibraltar Football League was established by the Gibraltar Football Association (GFA) in 1905. It originally contained eight member clubs, but it has grown over the years.

In 1909 the league grew to two divisions, and it currently has three divisions which clubs can be promoted and relegated between at the end of each season.

=== The Gibraltar cricket team ===
Cricket has been played in Gibraltar by British servicemen since the late 18th century. A cricket ground is known to have existed north of the Rock of Gibraltar in 1800. Civilians were playing the game as well as servicemen by 1822.

The Gibraltar Cricket Club was formed in 1883, and formed the backbone of civilian cricket until well into the 20th Century.

In 1890, a ship carrying the Australian cricket team on the way to a tour of England, docked in Gibraltar Harbour after a collision with two other ships. The Australians played a game against a Gibraltar Garrison team. The local side were dismissed for just 25, and the Australians won the game, scoring 150/8.

Gibraltar first participated in the ICC Trophy in 1982, and have played every tournament since, with the exception of the 2005 tournament, for which they failed to qualify. They have also competed in the European Championship on every occasion since it began in 1996.

=== Rugby Union ===
Campo Gibraltar Rugby Union Football Club plays all its games in nearby Spain.

== Music ==
Gibraltar has a small but thriving music scene spanning several genres, from electronic music to singer-songwriters and reggaes. Its best-known bands internationally were Melon Diesel (1995–2003), who gained considerable fame in both Spain and Latin America, and Breed 77 (1996–2018), who gained traction in the UK and Europe.

== Cuisine ==
Gibraltarian cuisine has evolved over the past two centuries as a unique blend of various dishes, of which calentita is the most iconic.

== See also ==
- Sport in Gibraltar
