= Canepa =

Canepa or Cánepa is a surname. Notable people with the surname include:

- Adolfo Canepa (born 1940), Gibraltarian politician
- Alice Canepa (born 1978), Italian tennis player
- Antonio Canepa (1908–1945), Sicilian politician
- Bruce Canepa, American race car driver
- Carlos Cánepa (politician), Peruvian politician
- Carlos Canepa (swimmer), (born 1943), Peruvian swimmer
- Cesare Canepa, Swiss curler
- Diego Cánepa (canoeist) (born 1976), Belgian sprint canoeist
- Diego Cánepa (politician) (born 1972), Uruguayan lawyer and politician
- Francesca Canepa (born 1971), Italian snowboarder
- Graciela Cánepa (1948–2006), Uruguayan actress
- Mariano Cánepa (born 1987), Argentinian handball player
- Mark Canepa, American computer technology executive
- Matthew Canepa, American historian
- Niccolò Canepa (born 1988), Italian motorcycle road racer
- Santiago Cánepa (born 1991), Argentinian handball player
- Tito Canepa (1916–2014), Dominican painter

== See also ==
- Canepa, San Marino, a village
- HMCS Barrie, a naval ship later called ARA Capitán Cánepa
