= De Bono =

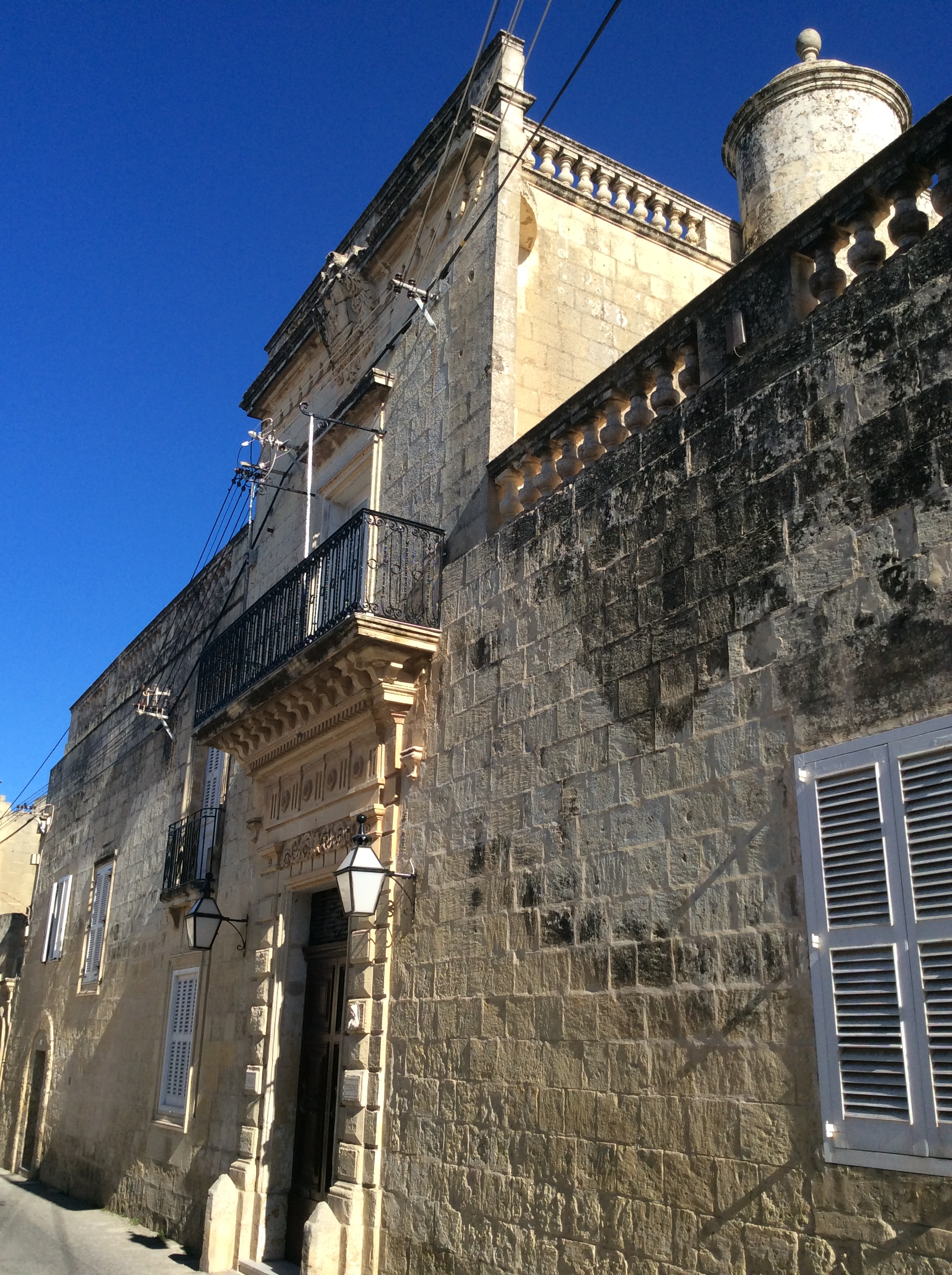
Villa Debono in Lija, Malta

De Bono is a surname of Italian origin, rooted from the Latin word "bonus" meaning "good". It originated in Northern Italy and its first known documentation appears in Parma in the thirteenth century, where it is recorded in deeds of property sale.

There are multiple variations of the surname, namely "Di Bono", "Del Bono", "Buono", "Buonomo", but all trace back to a common origin.

The abbreviation of De Bono from its original form into Debono (no spacing) is common in the Maltese islands. It could be found in its original form in Maltese records as early as 1420.

Notable people with the surname include:

- Andrea Debono (1821–1871), Maltese trader and explorer
- Charlton Debono (born 1984), Maltese long-distance runner
- Damaso Pio De Bono (1850–1927), Italian bishop
- Dan DeBono (born 1964), American writer and novelist
- Darren Debono (born 1974), Maltese footballer
- Edward de Bono (1933–2021), Maltese philosopher, physician, author, inventor and consultant
- Emilio De Bono (1866–1944), Italian general and fascist activist
- Franco Debono (born 1974), Maltese politician
- Gaspar de Bono (1530–1604), Spanish monk of the order of Minims, venerated as blessed
- Giovanna Debono (born 1956), Maltese politician
- Giovanni Pietro de Bono (d. 1546), Italian Catholic prelate
- Joseph E. Debono (1903–1974), Maltese physician and professor
- Josephine Burns de Bono (1908–1996), Maltese political activist and feminist
- Kristy Debono, Maltese politician
- Myriam Spiteri Debono (born 1952), Maltese politician
- Pietro de Bono (d. 1187), Italian Catholic cardinal
- Raphael Debono, 19th century Maltese minor philosopher
- S. Debono, 19th century Maltese scientist, linguist and minor philosopher
- Sarah De Bono (born 1992), Australian singer-songwriter and pianist

== See also ==
- Joe Debono Grech (born 1939), Maltese politician
- Pan de bono, a type of Colombian bread
