= Pizzarello =

Pizzarello is:

- an Italian traditional food from Puglia, a region in the southern part of Italy. It is called Pizzarello or "Pizzaridd" in the southern dialect;

- an Italian surname. Notable people with the surname include:

- Alberto Pizzarello, Gibraltarian poet
- Sandra Pizzarello (1933–2021), Italian biochemist

== See also ==
- Asteroid 7377 Pizzarello, named after Sandra Pizzarello
- Pizzarelli
