= Scerri =

Scerri is a surname of Maltese origin.

Notable people with the surname include:

- Charles Scerri (born 1964), Maltese footballer
- Chris Scerri (born 2006), Australian rules footballer
- Debbie Scerri (born 1969), Maltese television presenter and singer
- Eric Scerri (born 1953), American chemist, writer and philosopher
- Madeleine Scerri (born 1989), Maltese swimmer
- Mark Scerri (born 1990), Maltese footballer
- Pierre Scerri (fl. 1998), French telecommunications engineer and model builder
- Quinton Scerri (fl. 2003), Maltese politician and television personality
- Terence Scerri (born 1984), Maltese footballer

== See also ==
- Xerri (surname), list of people with the surname
