= Gaspar de Bono =

Blessed Gaspar de Bono, O.M.
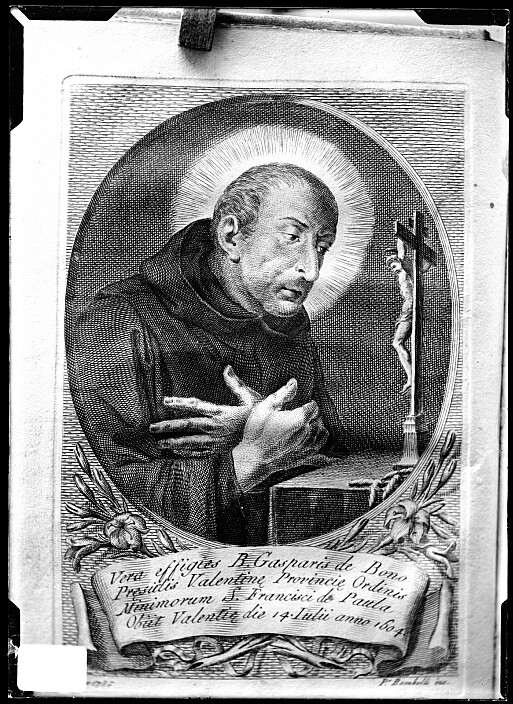
- 18th century engraving

Religious & priest
- Born: Gaspar de Bono i Manzón; 5 January 1530; Valencia, Kingdom of Valencia, Crown of Aragon
- Died: 14 July 1604; Valencia, Kingdom of Valencia, Crown of Aragon
- Venerated in: Catholic Church (Order of Minims & Archdiocese of Valencia)
- Beatified: 10 September 1786, Rome, Papal States, by Pope Pius VI
- Major shrine: Church of Sant Nicolau, Carrer dels Cavallers, 35, Valencia, Spain
- Feast: July 14
- Parent: Joan de Bonome

Gaspar de Bono i Montsó, O.M., (5 January 1530 – 14 July 1604) was a Valencian friar of the Order of Minims and Catholic priest. He is venerated as blessed by the Catholic Church.

== Life ==
De Bono was born on 5 January 1530 in Valencia, the second of the four children of Joan de Bonome (or Bonhóm), who had emigrated from Gascony, and his wife, Isabel Joana Montsó (or Monzó), originally from Villa de Cervera in the current Province of Lleida (Spanish: Lérida). Upon his birth, he was baptized at the nearby Church of San Nicolás. Having been born on the eve of the Feast of the Epiphany, he was named for one of the Biblical Magi.

Although Gaspar's parents were very pious, the family was poor. His father was a linen weaver by trade, but when his mother was blinded three years after his birth and became unable to help in the family trade, the father was forced to sell their home and his tools and took work as a grinder and reseller. As a child, he developed a noticeable stammer, a problem from which he suffered his whole life.

At the age of ten, De Bono began working with a silk merchant, but soon realized that his vocation was religious and began to study Latin while continuing to work to support his family. About 1545, he was admitted as a candidate to the Dominican Order, but, just as he was about to enter their novitiate, he was talked out of this by a brother-in-law, after which he returned home.

At age twenty, De Bono joined the army of the Emperor Charles V, in search of fortune. He served as a soldier for about ten years, but continued to try and live a devout and religious life, by praying, saying the rosary daily, donating to charity and frequenting places of worship. He fought in Lombardy where he was seriously wounded in the head. Left for dead, De Bono made a promise to enter the Minim friars, founded by Francis of Paola, if he survived.

De Bono did in fact recover, and soon entered the Minim Monastery of San Sebastián in Valencia, which was located a short distance from his family home, receiving the religious habit on 16 June 1560. He professed his religious vows as a member of the Order on 17 June of the following year and was ordained as a priest in 1562.

De Bono soon became known for his virtue and strict compliance with the Rule of Life of the Order. He was available to all the people of the neighborhood which he knew thoroughly. He was present to comfort his parents in their final hours, his mother dying on 29 April 1583, and his father a year later. He was soon named Master of novices for the Catalan Province of the Order, being responsible for the founding of a Minim monastery in Barcelona. He was elected to serve as Vicar Provincial. At the insistence of the Archbishop of Valencia, Juan de Ribera (now honored as a saint), in 1602 he was elected Corrector Provincial (regional superior) of Valencia. He is said to have remained humble and austere; retaining his devotions and customs, and continued to be noted for his prudence and charity throughout his life.

De Bono died in Valencia on 14 July 1604, at the age of 74. His remains were first entombed in the Church of San Sebastián, to which the monastery was attached. After the suppression of the monastery under the Napoleonic rule of Spain, the urn containing his bones was moved in 1835 to the Church of San Nicolás, where he had been baptized as a baby, and enshrined under the altar of the Chapel of St. Raphael.

== Veneration ==
De Bono was beatified by Pope Pius VI on 10 September 1786. His eulogy is written in the Roman Martyrology for 14 July: At Valencia in Spain, Blessed Gaspar de Bono, a priest of the Order of Minims, who left the arms of the prince of the world for the militia of Christ the King and for the sake of the house of ' Order in the Spanish province, who ruled with prudence and charity.

Each year, on the 14 July, small celebrations are held in De Bono's honor at the Impasse of Cañete in the Carmen neighborhood, the street where he was born.

== External sources ==
- Félix Puimayor y Budar. Compendio histórico de la vida del beato Gaspar de Bono, del Orden de Mínimos. Valencia: por Joseph Estevan, 1787.
