= Danino =

Name list

Danino is a surname. Notable people with the surname, along with its variants, include:

- Dan Danino (1911–1998), a British physician
- David Danino (1924–1990), an Israeli politician
- Jason Danino-Holt (born 1987), an Israeli theatre maker and former television presenter
- Jean Daninos (1906–2001), a Greek-French engineer and car builder
- Liran Danino (born 1991), an Israeli musician and actor
- Michel Danino, a Hindutva author
- Nina Danino (born 1955), a filmmaker and academic
- Omer Danino (born 1995), an Israeli football player
- Pierre Daninos (1913–2005), a French writer and humorist
- Roberto Dañino (born 1951), former Prime Minister of Peru (2001–2002)
- Shalom Danino (born 1956), an Israeli politician and businessman
- Tal Danino, a biologist and academic
- Yohanan Danino (born 1959), an Israeli police officer
