= Carlos Cánepa =

Carlos Cánepa may refer to:

- Carlos Cánepa (politician)
- Carlos Canepa (swimmer)
