= Canessa =

Canessa is a surname of Italian origin. Notable people with the name include:

- Alessio Canessa (born 1999), Italian football player
- Julio Canessa (1925–2015), Chilean military and political figure
- Julio Canessa (footballer) (born 1958), Uruguayan football player
- Marta Canessa (born 1936), Uruguayan historian, academic and writer, as well as former First Lady of Uruguay
- Pino Canessa (1907–2001), Italian sports sailor
- Roberto Canessa (born 1953), Uruguayan air crash survivor and political figure
- Stephen Canessa (born 1980), member of the Massachusetts House of Representatives
