= Parodi =

Parodi may refer to:

- Parodi's hemispingus, a species of bird endemic to Peru

== Places ==
- Parodi, Beed, a village in Ashti Taluka, Beed District, Maharashtra, India
- Parodi, Pune, a village in Shirur Taluka, Pune District, Maharashtra, India
- Parodi Ligure, a commune in northwest Italy
- Brigadier General Antonio Parodi, international airport in Esquel, Argentina

== People ==
- Alexandre Parodi (1901–1979), French diplomat and ambassador to the United Nations
- Armando J. Parodi (born 1942), Argentine glycobiologist
- Carlos Carrillo Parodi, Peruvian microbiologist
- Cristina Parodi (born 1964), Italian journalist and television host
- Delia Parodi (1913–1991), Argentine politician
- Filippo Parodi (1630–1702), Italian sculptor
- Franco Parodi (born 1989), Argentine football player
- Giovanni Battista Parodi (1674–1730), Italian painter
- Giulio Parodi (born 1997), Italian football player
- José Parodi (1932–2006), Paraguayan football coach and player
- Juan C. Parodi (born 1942), Argentine vascular surgeon and activist to alleviate poverty
- Juan Martín Parodi (born 1964), Uruguayan football player
- Les Parodi (born 1954), English football defender
- Lorenzo Raimundo Parodi (1895–1966), Argentine botanist and agronomist
- Lucas Parodi (born 1990), Argentine football player
- Mario Parodi (1917–1970), Italian classical guitarist
- Pasquale Parodi (born 1909), Italian football player and coach
- Simone Parodi (born 1986), Italian volleyball player
- Starr Parodi, American composer and musician
- Teresa Parodi (born 1947), Argentine singer-songwriter
- William Parodi (born 1973), Panamanian prosecutor

== See also ==
- Parody, a lampoon
- Parodi (film), Kannada film
- Gina Parody (born 1973), a Colombian lawyer and politician
- Dyson Parody (born 1984), a Gibraltarian darts player
