= Pizzarelli =

Pizzarelli is a surname. Notable people with the surname include:

- Alan Pizzarelli (born 1950), American poet, songwriter and musician
- Bucky Pizzarelli (1926–2020), American musician
- John Pizzarelli (born 1960), American musician
- Martin Pizzarelli (born 1963), American musician

== See also ==
- Pizzarello
