= GreenButton =

Defunct New Zealand-based software firm

- Company type: Subsidiary
- Industry: Cloud computing
- Founded: 2006 in Wellington, New Zealand
- Founder: Scott Houston
- Defunct: 2 May 2014
- Fate: Acquired by Microsoft
- Headquarters: Wellington, New Zealand
- Revenue: $1.5 million (2011)
- Parent: Microsoft
- Website: www.greenbutton.com

GreenButton was a software company based in Wellington, New Zealand. It was established in 2006 and it helped independent software vendors (ISVs) and enterprises transition to cloud computing. GreenButton operated additional offices in Palo Alto, California, and Seattle. On 2 May 2014, the company was acquired by Microsoft. Following the acquisition, GreenButton's technologies were incorporated into Microsoft's Azure cloud service.

== History ==
GreenButton was founded as InterGrid in 2006 in Wellington, New Zealand, to provide small-scale customers access to job processors. The company helped software vendors use cloud computing, offering a service called GreenButton in July 2010.

In 2011, the company was renamed GreenButton, and joined the Microsoft Partner Network. In 2011, GreenButton was declared as Microsoft Corp's Windows Azure ISV Partner of the Year. In May 2011, GreenButton allied with Microsoft. It included an investment reported at more than US$1 million, and adding Mark Canepa to its board of directors.

In December 2011, GreenButton opened two offices in the United States, the US headquarters in Palo Alto, California, and a sales office in Seattle.

GreenButton partnered with the Pixar Animation Studios and Microsoft's cloud computing platform Windows Azure, on a rendering service for RenderMan image-generating software announced in January 2012. The service enhances the RenderMan Interface Specification.

In June 2012, GreenButton announced a partnership with the GNS Science of New Zealand and American based Stillwater Group for cloud computing during seismic processing. In the same year, the company entered into a partnership with Numerix, an American firm that develops software for risk analysis of financial derivatives.

On 2 May 2014, GreenButton announced its acquisition by Microsoft with its technology integrated into Microsoft Azure. After its acquisition GreenButton operates under Microsoft Azure product line as Azure Batch.
