= William Parodi =

Panamanian lawyer

Prosecuting office of Panama circuit 14th.
- Incumbent
- Assumed office 2008

Personal details
- Born: 1973 (age 52–53) Panama City, Panamas
- Occupation: Lawyer

William Parodi studied law in Panama's National University and has a Master's degree on financial crimes from Spain.

Parodi is currently the prosecuting officer for circuit 14th, Panama city, Panama. His office is responsible for financial crimes and it is currently responsible for the David Murcia / D.M.G. Grupo Holding S.A. case.
