= Bottaro =

Bottaro is a surname. Notable people with the surname include:

- Amedeo Bottaro (born 1971), Italian politician
- Julián Bottaro (born 1992), Argentine footballer
- Luciano Bottaro (1931–2006), Italian comic book artist
- Viviana Bottaro (born 1987), Italian karateka
