= Julio Canessa (footballer) =

Uruguayan footballer (born 1958)

Personal information
- Full name: Julio César Canessa Zucco
- Date of birth: 23 March 1958 (age 68)
- Place of birth: Uruguay
- Position: Defender

Senior career*
Years	Team	Apps	(Gls)
1979–1981	Atlas F.C.		
1981–1982	Tecos		
1982–1983	Club Necaxa		
1983–1984	Club León		
1984–1985	Atlético Potosino		
1985	Peñarol		
1987–1988	Atlante		
- * Club domestic league appearances and goals

Julio César Canessa Zucco (born 23 March 1958 in Uruguay) is a Uruguayan former professional footballer who played as a defender.

== Career ==
Canessa moved to Mexico in 1979 joining Atlas F.C., after having been offered $4,000, a house and a car.

== Personal life ==
Canessa was married to Mexican singer Lupita D'Alessio from 1984 to 1985. He took up Mexican citizenship.
