= Shalom Danino =

Israeli businessman and politician

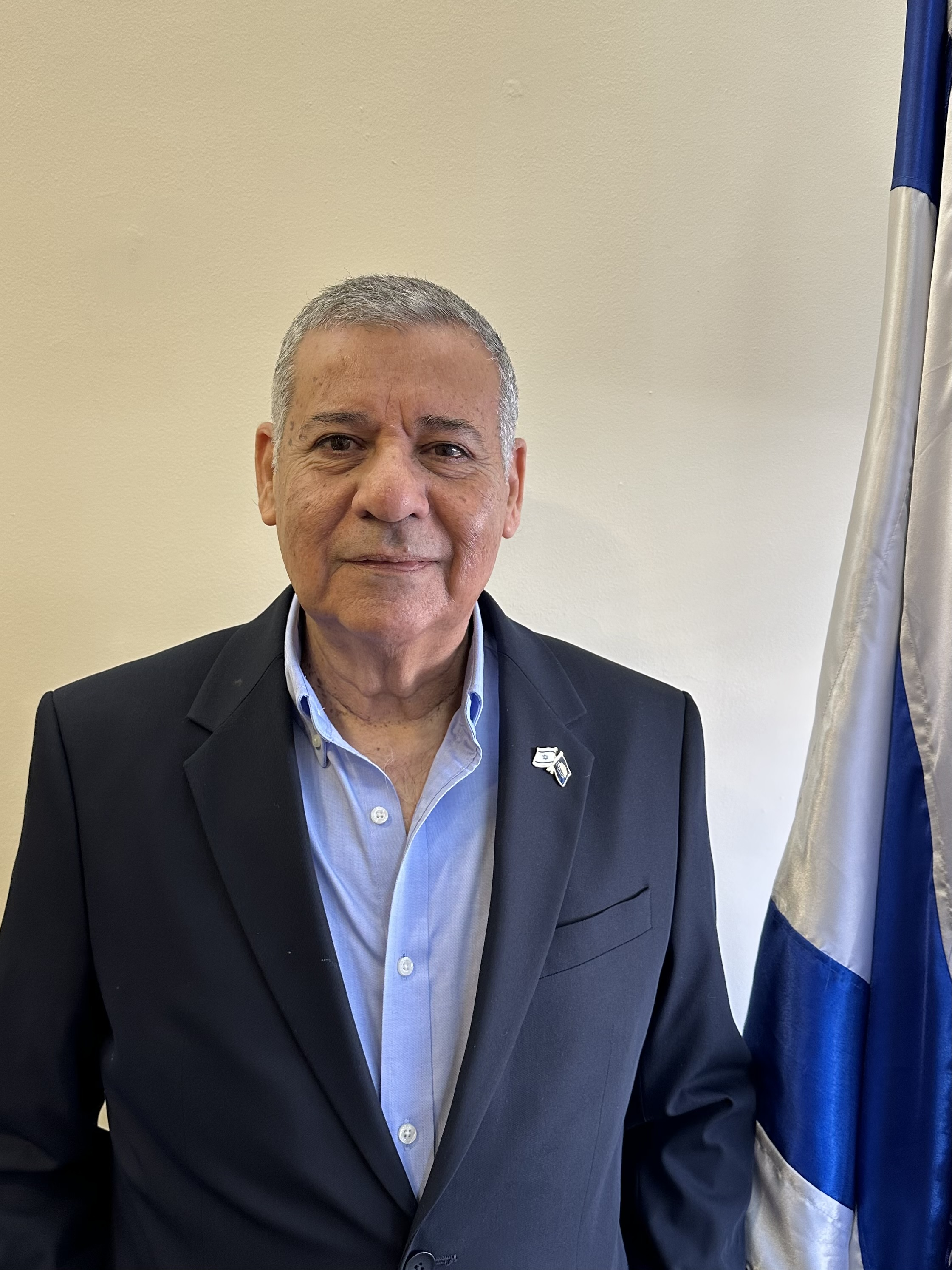
- Danino in 2022

Faction represented in the Knesset
- 2022–2026: Likud

Personal details
- Born: 30 April 1956 (age 70) Ofakim, Israel

Shalom Danino (Hebrew: שלום דנינו; born 30 April 1956) is an Israeli businessman and politician who served as a member of the Knesset for Likud from 2022 to 2026.

== Biography ==
Danino was born in Ofakim in 1956 into a family that had immigrated from Morocco. He served in the Israel Air Force for ten years, obtained a bachelor's degree from Ben-Gurion University of the Negev and a certificate of management from Bar-Ilan University. He owns a nursing home and real estate company.

Prior to the 2022 Knesset elections Danino was placed twenty-second on the Likud list, a slot reserved for candidates from the Negev. He was elected to the Knesset as the party won 32 seats.

In the 2026 Israeli legislative election Danino placed on the 50th place on the Likud least.

His brother Yitzhak is mayor of Ofakim.
