= Robba =

Donatist nun (383/4 – 434)

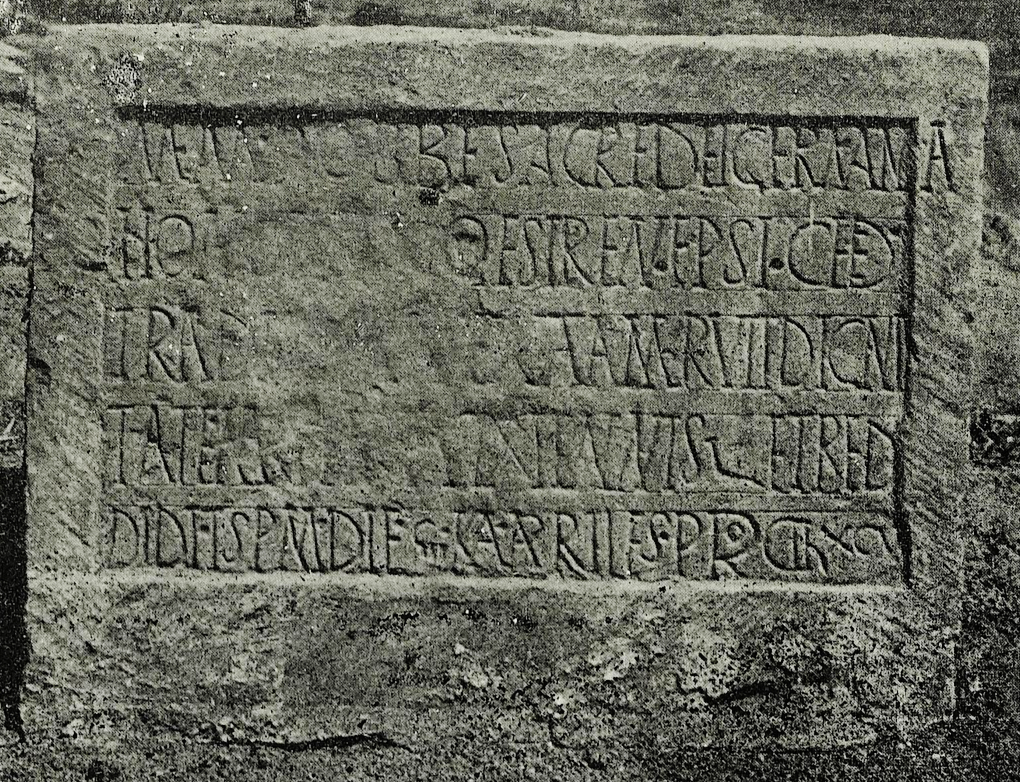
Epitaph of Robba, which reads: 'Memorial of Robba, consecrated servant of God, sister of Honoratus bishop of Aquae Sirensis; having succumbed to the mutiny of the traditores, she earned the dignity of a martyr; she was fifty years old and gave up the spirit on the eighth day of the calends of April in the year 395 of the province [434 CE]'

Robba (383/4 – 434) was a North African Donatist nun. A church was built in Ala Miliaria to commemorate her murder by traditors.

Robba was born in 383/4, the sister of Bishop Honoratus of Aquae Sirenses. She was a consecrated virgin of Donatism.

In 434, at the age of fifty, she was killed in an uprising of traditores (Catholic Christians who had given up their scriptures during Roman persecution).

Donatists either built or repurposed part of a military building in Ala Miliaria (modern-day Beniane, Algeria) into a substantial church, where Robba and several others are buried. Robba is commemorated there by an epitaph which calls her a martyr. The church was rediscovered by archaeologist Stéphane Gsell in 1899.

Robba's is the last known Donatist epitaph, and it demonstrates the public presence of Donatists in North Africa decades after the official suppression of Donatism at the Council of Carthage in 411.
