= Graciela Cánepa =

Graciela Cánepa (July 28, 1948 – October 7, 2006) was an Uruguayan actress and television presenter.

== Life ==
She was born on July 28, 1948 in Montevideo. She died from cardiopulmonary arrest in Asunción, Paraguay, on October 7, 2006, at the age 58.

== Filmography ==
- Los corruptores, 1987
- Miss Ameriguá, 1994
- El toque del oboe, 1998
- Arriba País, 1998–2000 (TV)
- El Trece Para Todos, 2000–2002 (TV)
- De Todo, Un Poco, 2002–2003 (TV)
- Cándida, 2004
- Shopping House TV, 2006 (TV)
- La Chuchi, 2006 (TV)
- La Hora de las compras (TV)
- Sombras en la Noche (TV)

== Theatre ==
- Auto de la compadecida
- Cuatro para Chejov
- El Burgués Gentilhombre
- El diario de Ana Frank
- El médico a palos
- Entre pitos y flautas
- Feliz día Papá
- La cenicienta
- La gotera
- La Piaf
- La vida que te di
- Los hermanos queridos
- Pluto
- Sueño de una noche de verano
- Caligula
- Todos en París conocen
