= Raphael Debono =

Maltese philosopher

- Born: Malta
- Occupation: Philosophy

Raphael Debono (19th century) was a Maltese minor philosopher. In philosophy he mostly specialised in logic. No portrait of him is known to exist.

== Life ==
Almost nothing is known about the personal life of Debono. He was probably one of the thousands of Maltese emigrants in Cairo, Egypt, around the end of the 19th century.

== Extant work ==
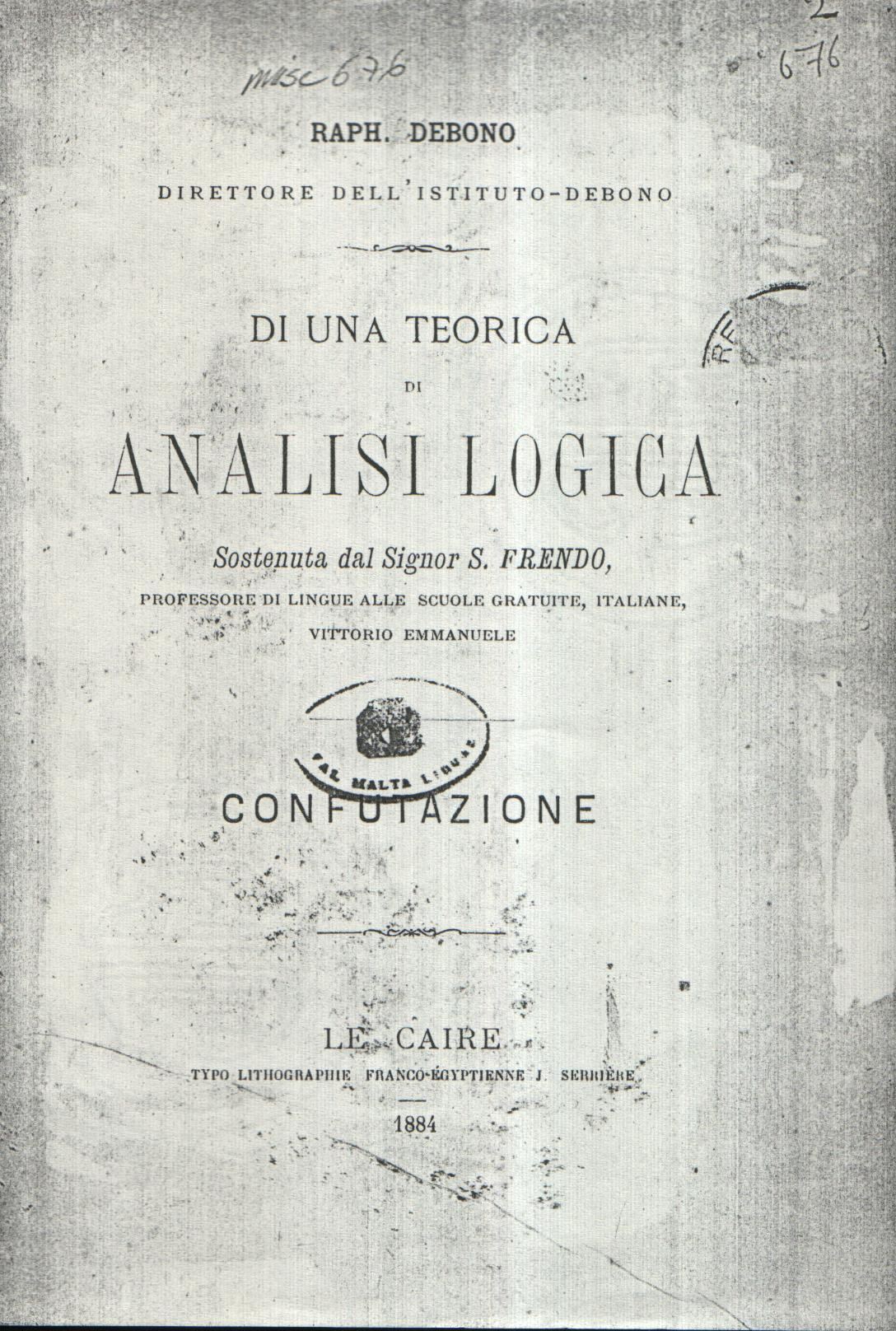
Di una Teorica di Analisi Logica (1884) of Raphael Debono

Just one composition of Debono survives as yet. It is a pamphlet in Italian published in Cairo in 1884 (Typo Lithographe Franco-Egyptienne J. Serrière) under the title Di una Teorica di Analisi Logica (An Investigation of Analytical Logic). The work is an interesting disputation on technical points of some aspects of symbolic logic, also called mathematical logic. The tone used is friendly. If the disputation ever took place (it might be supposed), it was between two friends in the professional spirit of academic collaboration and amity. Perhaps this is an inherent message which Debono also wanted to get through to his readers. Nevertheless, Debono mentions a certain S. Frendo as his interlocutor, who might have been a language professor at the Italian public schools of Cairo.

After an introduction, the work is divided into three parts, amongst which the first is the most substantial and important. The first part bears the name Pro Veritate (For Truth). Debono refutes certain positions of analytic logic held by his colleague. Debono seems to imply that the positions were exposed in an earlier publication by Frendo.

The other two parts of the work successively refer to a letter which Debono had written (perhaps in some newspaper), and to Frendo’s publication. Few other details are provided to get at the bottom of the story. Nevertheless, the style and argumentation of the work is intriguing. It is clear that Debono is of an Aristotelian frame of mind.

== Sources ==
- Mark Montebello, Il-Ktieb tal-Filosofija f’Malta (A Source Book of Philosophy in Malta), PIN Publications, Malta, 2001.

== See also ==
- Philosophy in Malta
