= D.M.G. Grupo Holding S.A. =

Colombian conglomerate and Ponzi scheme shut down in 2008

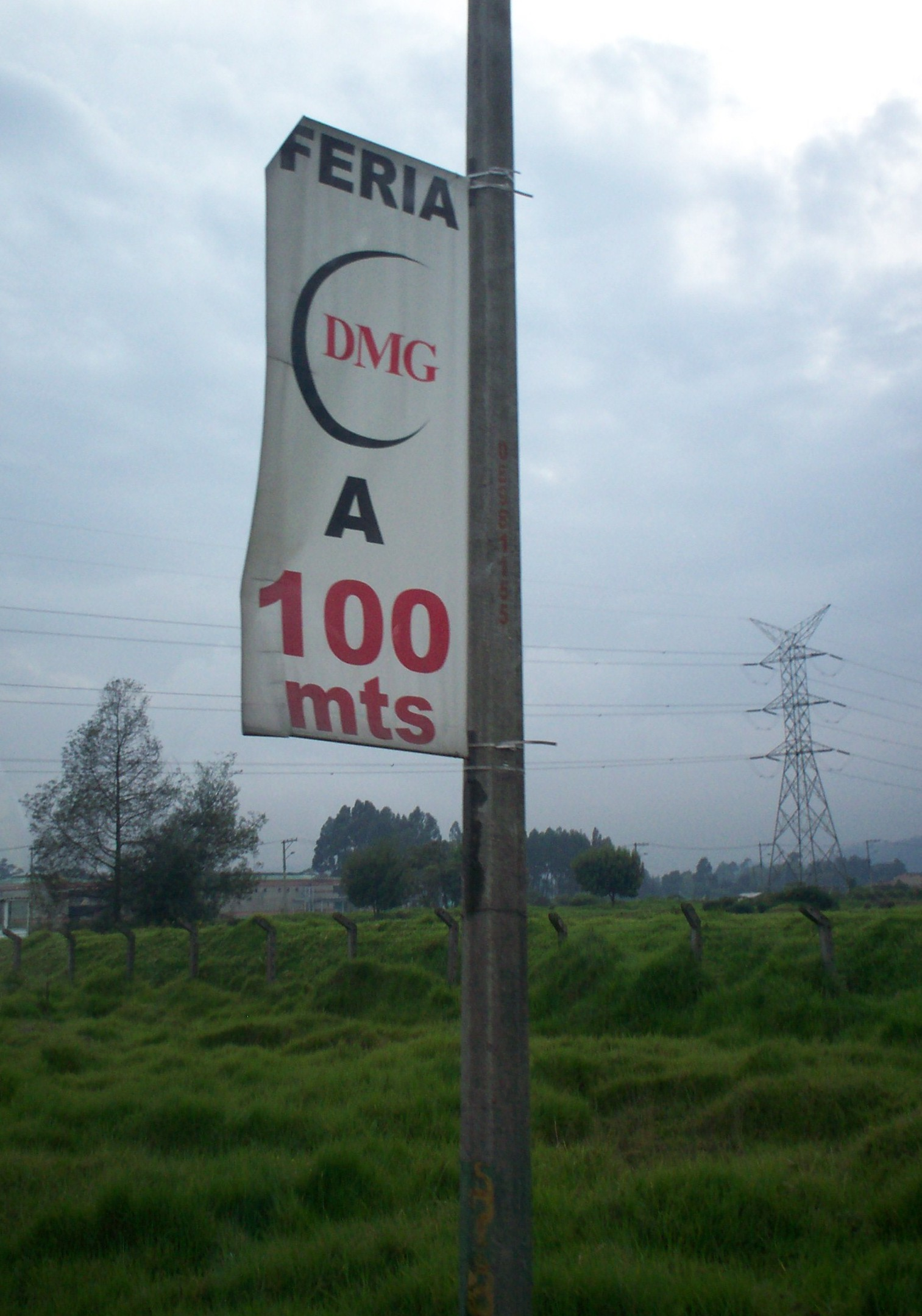
A DMG advertisement near Autopista Norte in Bogotá.

D.M.G. Grupo Holding S.A., commonly known as DMG, was a Colombian commercial conglomerate founded and controlled by David Murcia Guzmán. DMG sold prepaid cards that could be used to obtain goods and services from company stores and affiliated merchants. Purchasers were also offered later cash payments at rates far above those available through the regulated financial system. Colombian authorities determined that the arrangement involved the unauthorized mass collection of money from the public, and economic researchers have classified it as a Ponzi scheme.

The Colombian government intervened in DMG and shut down its operations on 17 November 2008 amid a wider national crisis involving pyramid schemes. Murcia was arrested in Panama and transferred to Colombia three days later. He was convicted in Colombia of aggravated money laundering and the unauthorized mass and habitual collection of money. His original sentence of 30 years and eight months was reduced by the Supreme Court of Justice of Colombia in 2016 to 22 years and ten months. In a separate United States prosecution, Murcia pleaded guilty to participating in a conspiracy that laundered illicit funds, including narcotics proceeds, through DMG. He was sentenced to nine years in federal prison.

By March 2023, the Colombian liquidation process had recognized 193,302 people affected by DMG's unauthorized collection of funds. Their accepted claims totaled more than 1.041 trillion Colombian pesos, of which approximately 96.97 billion pesos had been returned.

== History ==
=== Origins and expansion ===
Murcia began developing DMG in southern Colombia around 2003, initially presenting it as a multilevel marketing business. Grupo DMG S.A. was formally incorporated in April 2005 with capital of 100 million pesos. Murcia held a 51 percent interest in the company. In 2006, he and the same group of shareholders established D.M.G. Grupo Holding S.A.

The enterprise first became influential in Putumayo Department, including the municipalities of Puerto Asís, Mocoa, Orito and La Hormiga, before expanding elsewhere in Colombia. By 2008, DMG had a presence in 62 Colombian municipalities and had investments in Panama, Venezuela and Ecuador. United States prosecutors later estimated that DMG had approximately 400,000 customers by that year.

=== Business model ===
Customers gave DMG money in exchange for prepaid cards. The cards could be used to purchase electronics and other merchandise at DMG-operated stores, as well as goods and services supplied by affiliated businesses. These included supermarkets and sellers of furniture, appliances and vehicles.

DMG maintained that the cards distinguished its operation from an ordinary investment or deposit-taking business because customers received purchasing power in return for their money. The economically significant part of the arrangement, however, was DMG's later repayment of all or part of the amount paid for a card at rates substantially higher than those offered by conventional financial institutions. Transparencia por Colombia identified these repayments as the Ponzi component of the operation.

Early participants received substantial payments, which helped attract additional customers. Many later participants lost their money after the government closed the company; according to Reuters, some customers had mortgaged their homes in order to participate.

== Government intervention ==
In November 2008, the collapse of several unauthorized investment operations caused losses and public disorder in different parts of Colombia. The government declared a state of emergency and issued Decree 4334 of 2008, which established a procedure for taking possession of assets connected to unauthorized mass collection of public funds.

Authorities took control of DMG's property and businesses on 17 November and ordered its establishments closed. Thousands of DMG customers subsequently protested the intervention. The crisis particularly affected lower-income participants who had placed savings or borrowed money in the schemes.

Murcia was in Panama when Colombian authorities sought his arrest. Panamanian authorities detained him, and he was transferred to Colombia on 20 November 2008 to face charges including money laundering and financial crimes. The Superintendencia de Sociedades initially administered DMG through a possession-and-restitution proceeding and subsequently placed it in judicial liquidation.

== Criminal proceedings ==
=== Colombia ===
On 16 December 2009, a Bogotá court sentenced Murcia to 30 years and eight months in prison for aggravated money laundering and the unauthorized mass and habitual collection of public money. The court also imposed a fine equivalent to 50,000 monthly minimum wages.

In February 2016, the Supreme Court reduced the prison term to 22 years and ten months after finding an error in the calculation of the original sentence. Murcia was extradited to the United States in 2010. After completing his United States sentence, he was returned to Colombia in June 2019 to continue serving the Colombian sentence.

=== United States ===
United States prosecutors charged that Murcia and several DMG employees and affiliates used DMG companies to launder narcotics proceeds through the Black Market Peso Exchange. According to the prosecution, illicit dollars in the United States were exchanged for pesos collected through apparently legitimate DMG transactions in Colombia.

Murcia pleaded guilty to the money-laundering conspiracy. On 8 July 2011, the United States District Court for the Southern District of New York sentenced him to nine years in prison. He was also ordered to forfeit US$7 million and ten properties in Florida and California.

== Liquidation and restitution ==
The purpose of the Colombian intervention and liquidation proceedings was to locate DMG-related property and return available assets to people whose money had been collected without authorization. The proceedings included the seizure, valuation and attempted sale or distribution of cash, movable property and real estate.

As of March 2023, the court-appointed intervention agent had recognized 193,302 affected people with claims totaling 1,041,631,416,623 pesos. Authorities had recovered or placed under the liquidation process tens of billions of pesos in cash and other property. A total of 96,969,092,137 pesos had been returned: approximately 41.55 billion during the initial possession proceeding and 55.42 billion during the judicial liquidation.

== Economic and social impact ==
DMG was one of the two largest schemes involved in Colombia's 2008 pyramid crisis, together with DRFE. A study published in the Journal of Banking & Finance estimated that the two operations collectively received deposits from more than half a million customers equal to approximately 1.2 percent of Colombia's annual gross domestic product.

The study found that participants in DMG and DRFE obtained approximately 40 percent more formal-sector loans before the schemes were closed than otherwise comparable non-participants. Municipalities in which the schemes were more prevalent subsequently experienced lower bank deposits, while the proportion of non-performing loans among participants rose approximately 35 percent relative to non-participants. Participants' bank deposits had not fully recovered two years after the shutdowns.

== See also ==
- Ponzi scheme
- Pyramid scheme
- Money laundering
- Confidence trick
