= Damaso Pio De Bono =

Sicilian bishop in Italy (1850–1927)

- Titular Bishop of Troas
- Church: Catholic Church
- See: Troas
- In office: 17 December 1925 – 14 November 1927
- Predecessor: Antonio Bassani
- Successor: Ambrogio Onorato Luddi
- Previous post: Bishop of Caltagirone (1898-1925)

Orders
- Ordination: 4 April 1874
- Consecration: 11 December 1898 by Michelangelo Celesia

Personal details
- Born: 23 October 1850 Bivona, Province of Girgenti, Kingdom of the Two Sicilies
- Died: 14 November 1927 (aged 77) Bivona, Province of Girgenti/Agrigento, Kingdom of Italy

Damaso Pio De Bono (Bivona 23 October 1850 – Bivona 14 November 1927) was the eighth bishop of Caltagirone in Italy.

== Biography ==
Damaso studied in Bivona until middle school and in Palermo during high school. In 1869 he studied theology and entered the seminary of Agrigento. He was ordained a priest on April 4, 1874 in Palermo. Two years later (June 4, 1876), he was appointed archpriest of Bivona and lived there for the next 20 years. In 1897, he was appointed director of the College of Saints Augustine and Thomas of Agrigento and the rector of the local seminary. Pope Leo XIII appointed him bishop in August 1899 for the diocese of Caltagirone: he went to Rome to ask the Pope to lift the prohibition on Italian Catholics participating in national political life.

== Activity ==
During his bishopric matures and is carried through the happy season of the Christian Social People's Party whose experience will arise which cooperate the priest Don Luigi Sturzo.

Certainly without De Bono, Sturzo wouldn't to be able to become a politician and statesman who was, much less couldn't to be continuing to remain in the ministry. De Bono and Sturzo together with Mariano Rampolla were placed in the area of innovative and were an expression of the new course that was born with Pope Leo XIII and his encyclical teachings Rerum Novarum.

They were all three the great personalities of Sicily. De Bono argues Sturzo order to become mayor of Caltagirone, continue to give birth to the People's Party and guide him as leader and secretary. The office the mayor Luigi Sturzo is considered today among the most important political events in the history of Italy. Its relevance was also a moral and ethical, because of the corruption present in the municipal administration of then stimulated also by the central government. The Catholic's movement reached extraordinary dimensions and appearances, not only in doctrine and in projects, especially in the concrete achievements. It was about Sturzo - and then De Bono - the policy has been removed from the ford of the Vatican because of NOT EXPEDIT, preventing Catholics from politics and be elected to the Parliament, had come to support the corrupt men and finally supported the corrupt men of Giolitti. After the murder of Matteotti, Luigi Sturzo, as others opposers of Fascism, was forced first to resign as secretary of Italian Popular Party and then to abandon Italy. De Bono also suffers the same fate and April 2, 1925 was forced to resign as Bishop of Caltagirone, which were promptly accepted by the Vatican April 12, 1925 . City is therefore in his home where he died in 1927 and his remains rest in the new Mother Church, which he restored during the twenty years in which he was dean.
