= Pizzarello (food) =

Traditional food from Apulia, southern Italy

Pizzarello is a traditional Italian food from Apulia, a region in southern Italy. Its original name in the local dialect is Pizzaridd. The Pizzarello is a long salty baked bread, seasoned with tomatoes and sometimes also with olives. The baking makes it crunchy.

== Origins ==
Christians wake up early on Good Friday, in the week of Easter. As they had a long fasting day, during which they could not eat meat, stalls in the streets sold a typical sandwich filled with cheese, tomatoes and other vegetables.

The typical Pizzaridd, originally made only for Good Friday, became over time a food produced in some towns, such as Terlizzi, for eating on Fridays generally. The name seems close to "pizza", but the kneading is different.
