= Liran Danino =

Israeli musician (born 1991)

- לירן דנינו
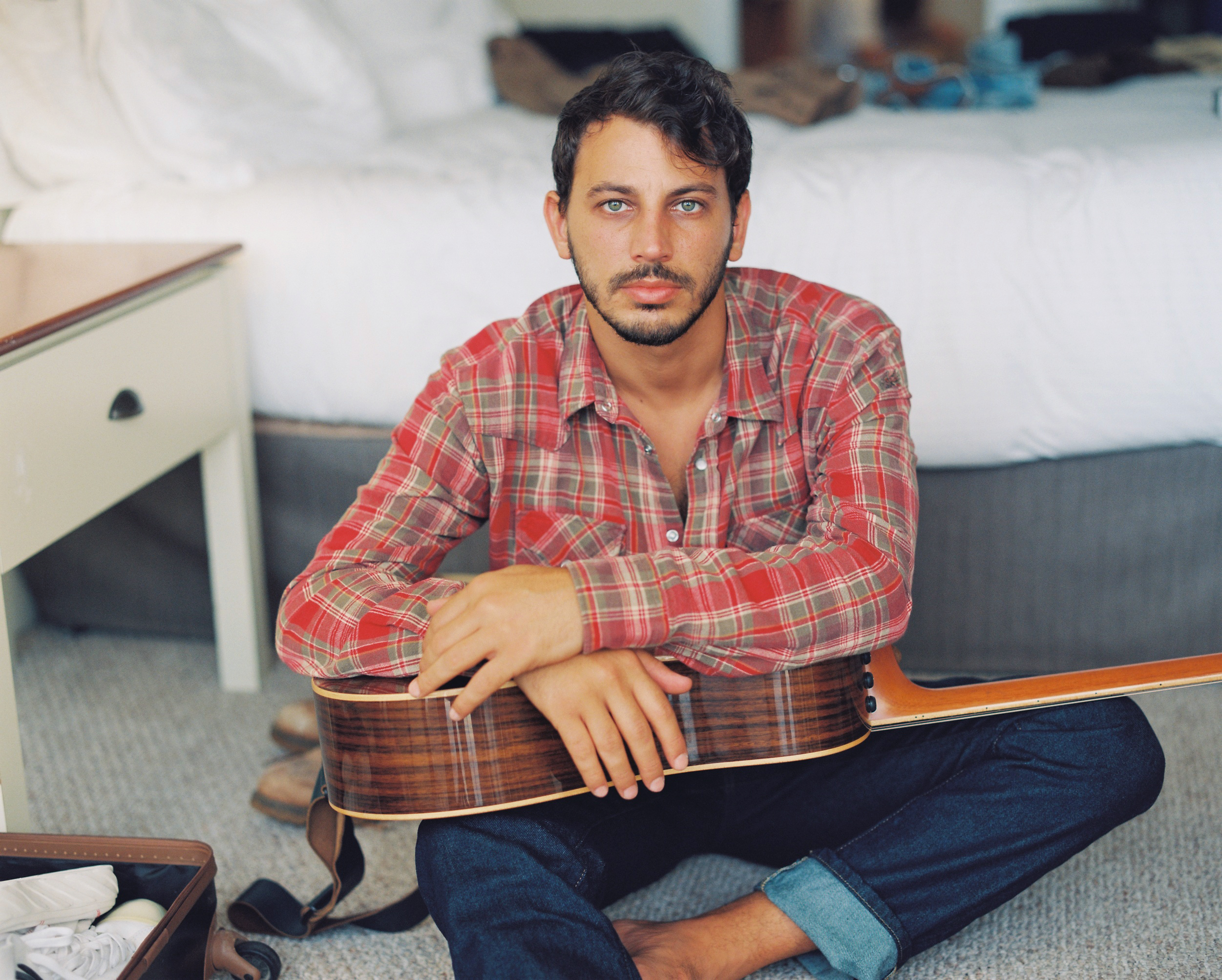
- Liran Danino in 2021
- Born: February 3, 1991 (age 35); Petah Tikva, Israel
- Occupations: Singer, actor, composer, songwriter, musician
- Years active: 2009–present
- Musical career
- Genres: Pop; music of Israel; soul
- Labels: Aromamusic; Hed Arzi Music

Liran Danino (born February 3, 1991) is an Israeli singer, actor, composer, songwriter, and musician.

== Early life and education ==
Liran Danino was born on February 3, 1991, in Petah Tikva, Israel. Danino grew up and studied in Petah Tikva. His father is the singer Avi Dan. His parents divorced when he was two years old. His mother remarried Meir Bouzaglo, and they had three more children. He majored in music at the Ben Shemen Youth Village Boarding High School.

In April 2010, he enlisted in the Israeli army, in the Intelligence Corps.

== Career ==
In January 2024, he released the single "אם מחר אני מת". On April 18 of the same year, Danino released a cover of Omer Adam's song "לילות וקללות". On May 26, Danino released "באך", the first single from a new album. The song was written and composed by טל קסטיאל and Gil Vaingarten. The melody of the song is based on Bach's Prelude, an important work by Johann Sebastian Bach.

== Personal life ==
In 2013, he was in a relationship with Neta Alchimister.

In 2019, he was in a relationship with Omer Nodelman.

In the years 2020–2023, he was in a relationship with Taylor Malkov.

== Discography ==
=== Studio albums ===
- לירן דנינו (2012)

=== Mini albums ===
- מי שאנחנו (2021)
