= San Nicolás, Valencia =

St. Nicholas' Church
- Church of Sant Nicolau de Bari and Sant Pere Màrtir
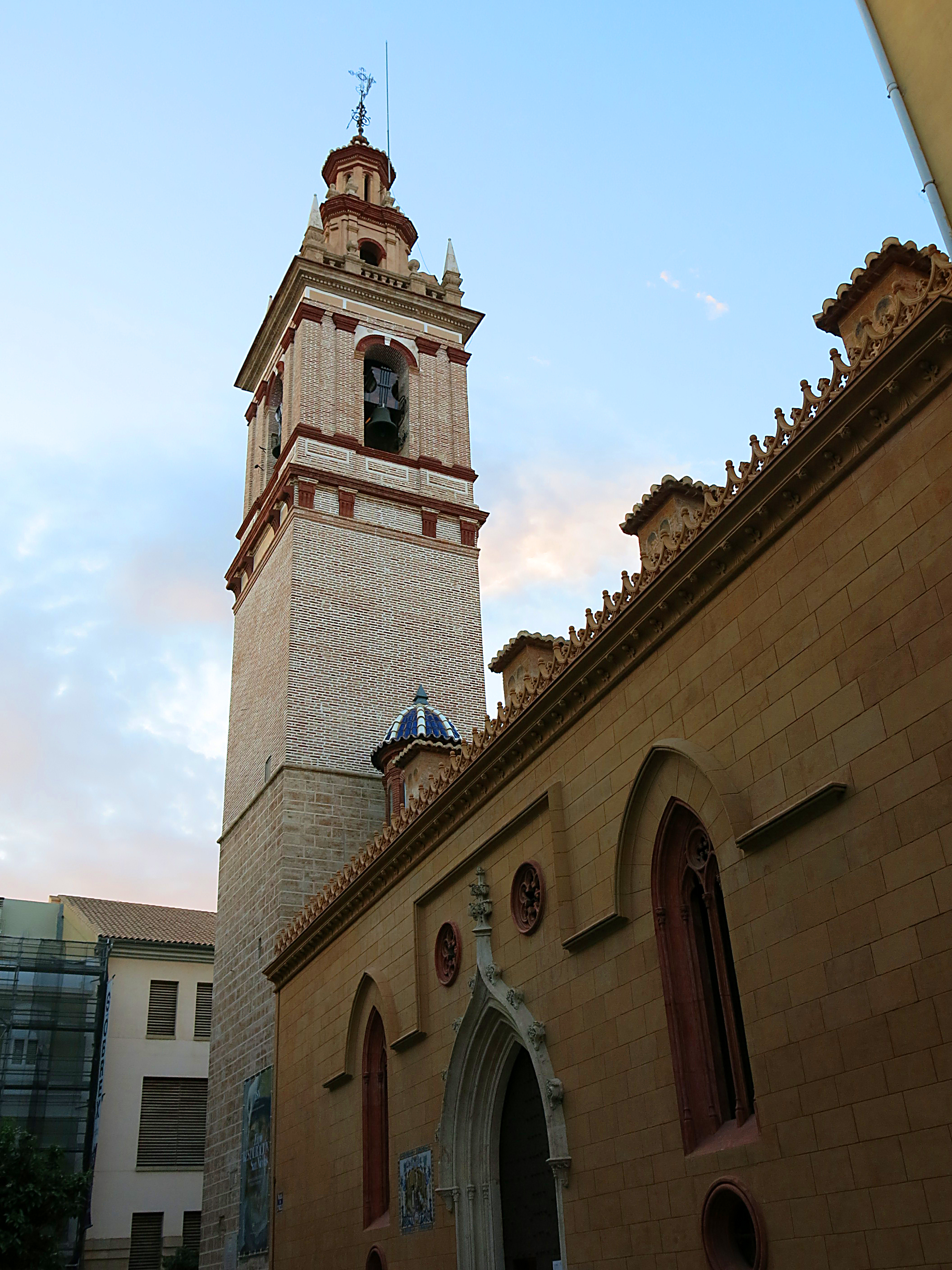
- South façade and bell tower
- St. Nicholas' Church
- 39°28′34.104″N 0°22′43.748″W
- Location: Valencia, Valencian Community
- Address: Calle Caballeros, 35
- Country: Spain
- Denomination: Catholic Church

History
- Founded: 13th century
- Dedication: Saint Nicholas; Peter of Verona

Architecture
- Style: Valencian Gothic

Administration
- Archdiocese: Valencia

The Church of Sant Nicolau de Bari and Sant Pere Màrtir is a Valencian Gothic style, Catholic parish church located in Valencia, Spain.

== History ==
The church was founded in the 13th century, with a layout that includes a single-nave with six chapels between the buttresses and polygonal apse. The church was refurbished in Gothic style in the 15th century, with a rose window alluding to a miracle of Saint Nicholas. A standalone chapel closed with a gate was built next to the church, which serves as the parish cemetery and, accordingly, it is known as the fossar ('cemetery'). The church portal, which overlooks the Square of San Nicolás, however, is a 19th-century neo-Gothic construction.

The interior of the church was completed between 1690 and 1693, and was decorated by Juan Pérez Castiel in Baroque fashion. It has frescoes, depicting the lives of Saint Nicholas and Peter of Verona, along with virtues and allegories, designed by Antonio Palomino and completed by Dionís Vidal. The chapel altarpieces include works by Juan de Juanes, Fernando Yáñez de la Almedina, Jerónimo Jacinto de Espinosa, and José Vergara Gimeno.

Pope Callixtus III, born Alfonso de Borgia, was a rector of the Church of San Nicolás before becoming pope. On the wall to the left of the portal is a ceramic plaque dedicated to him, commemorating the prediction of Saint Vincent Ferrer that Alfonso de Borgia would become pope and then would canonize Ferrer.

== Gallery ==
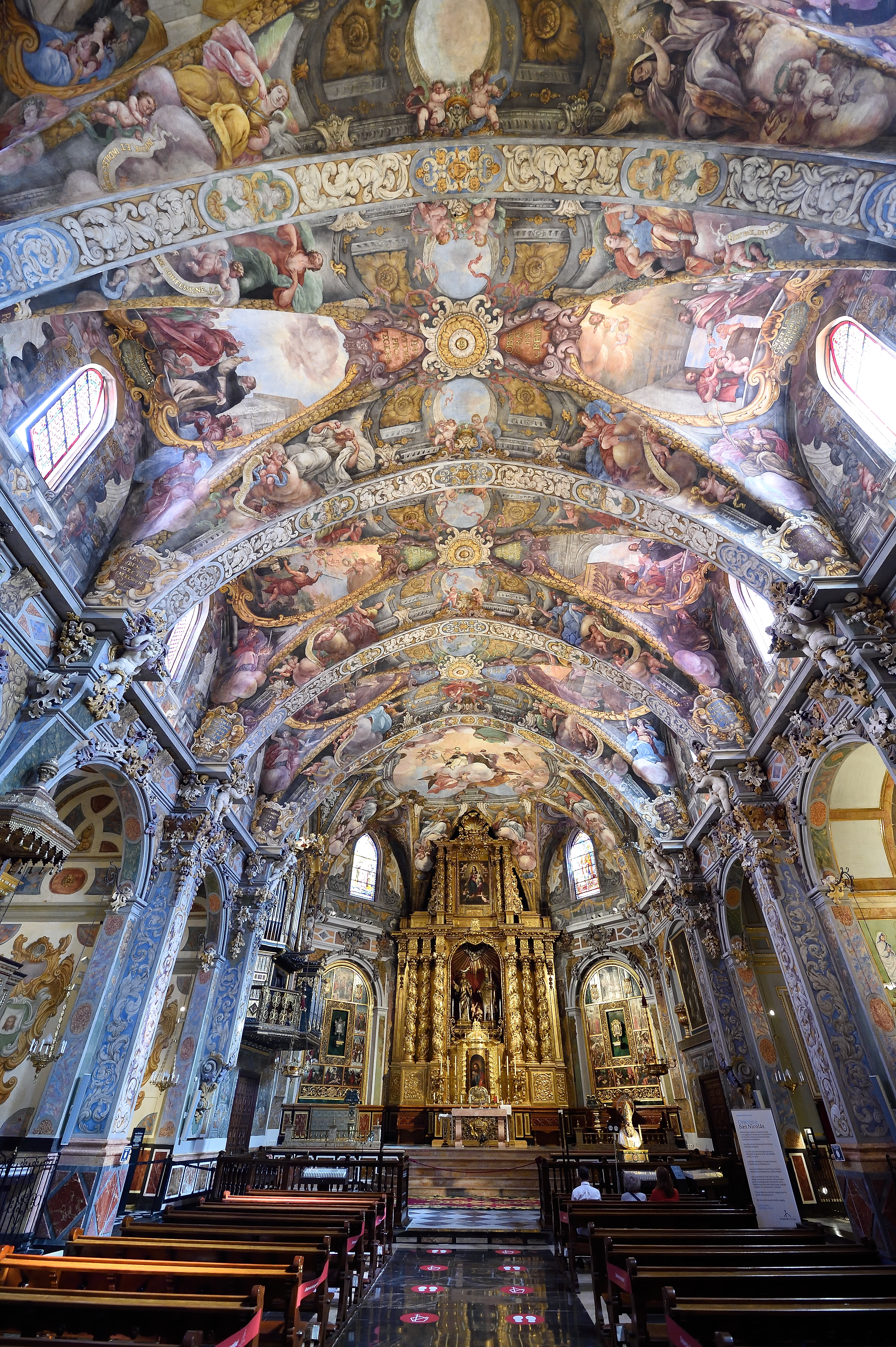
Interior

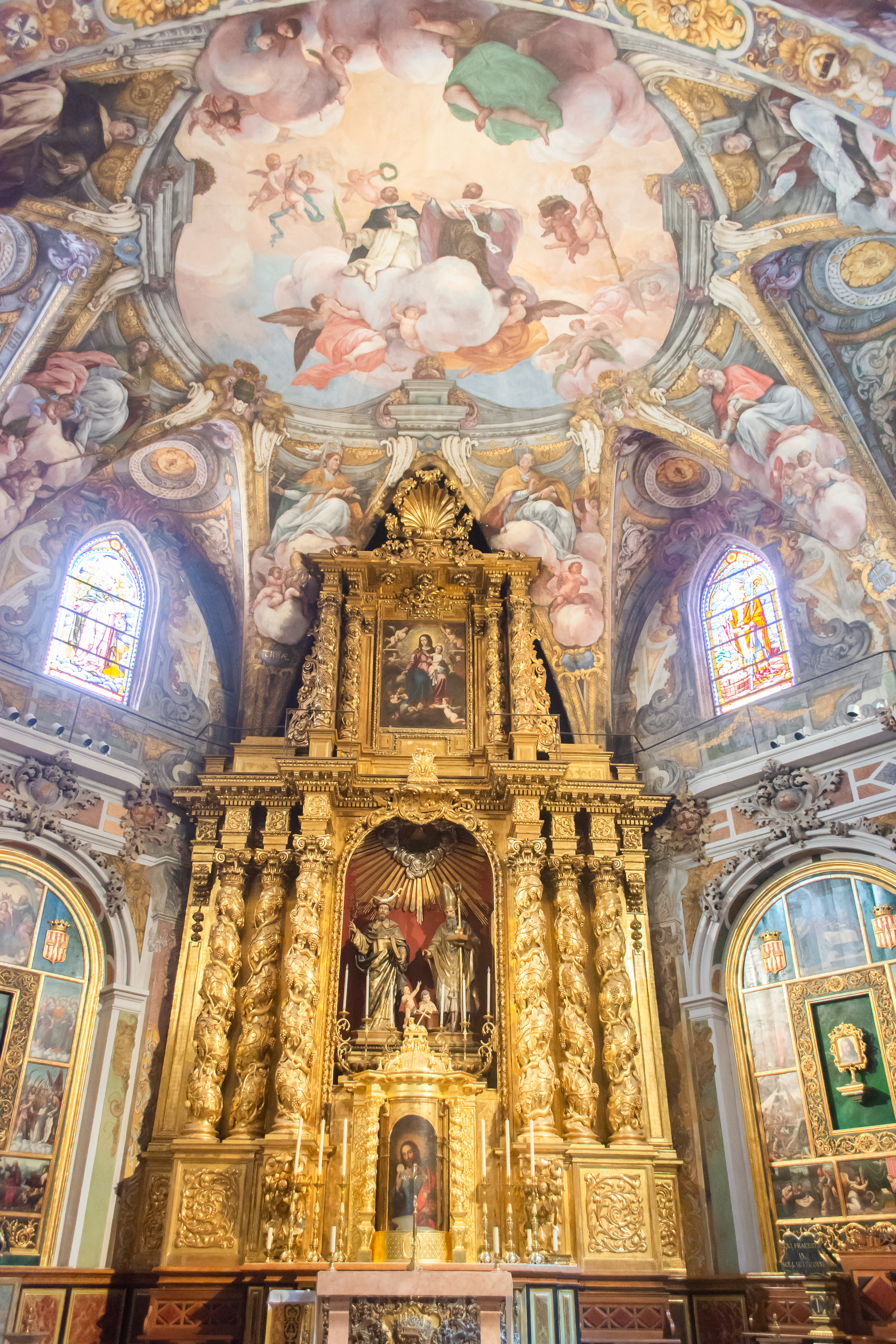
Main altar

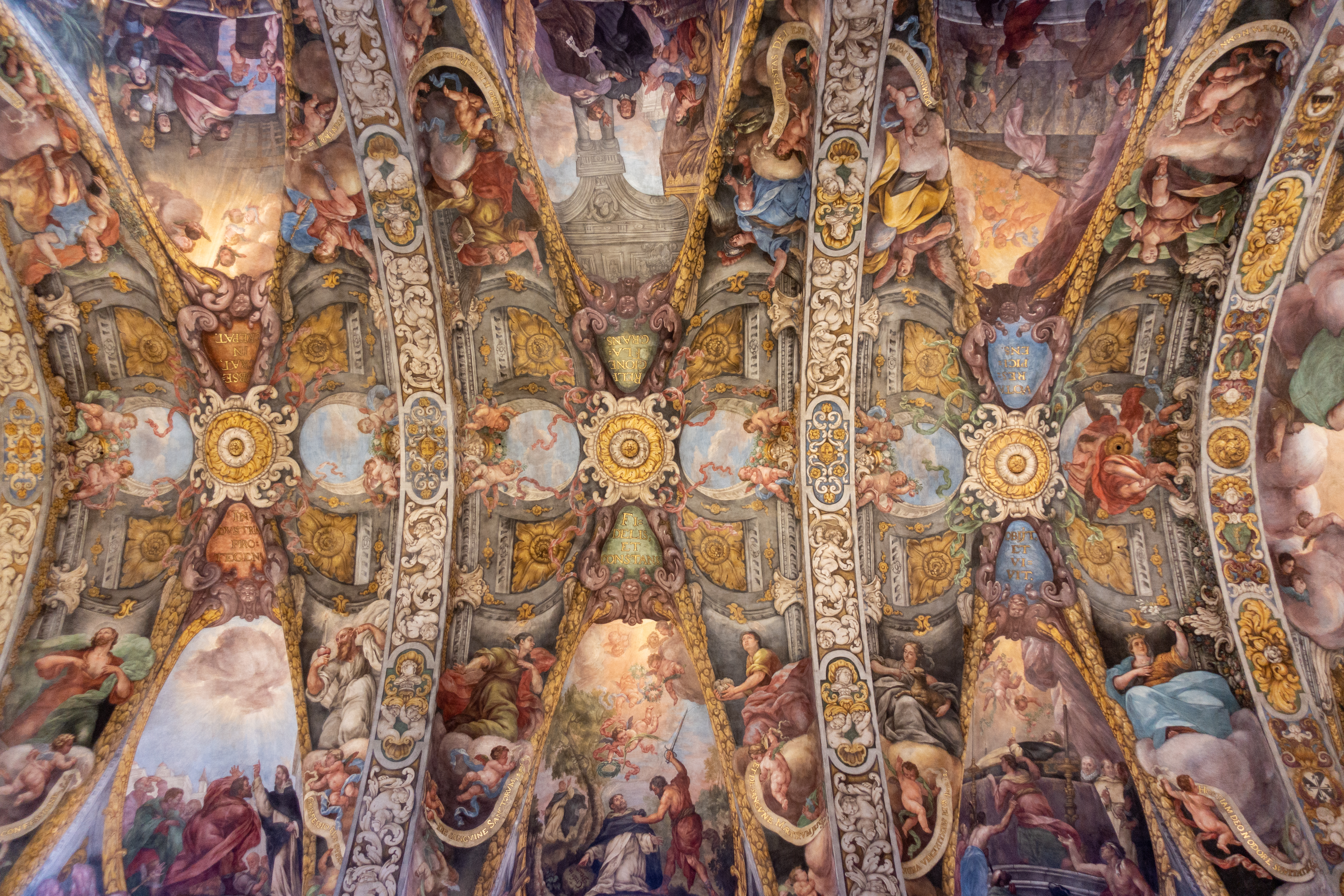
Ceiling fresco

== See also ==
- Catholic Church in Spain
- Route of the Borgias
