= St Andrew's Church, Gibraltar =

St Andrew's Church
- St Andrew's Church, Gibraltar
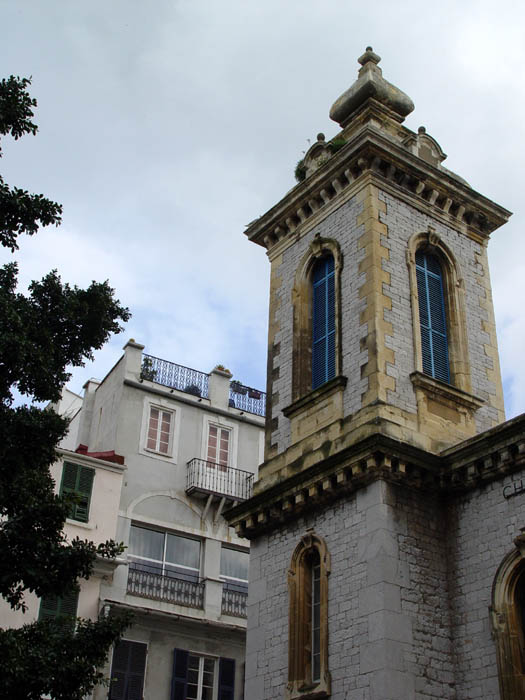
- View of the Church tower from Governor's Parade.
- St Andrew's Church
- 36.138576°N 5.352619°W
- Location: Governor's Parade
- Country: Gibraltar
- Denomination: Church of Scotland

History
- Founded: May 1854
- Dedicated: May 1854

Architecture
- Years built: 1853
- Closed: December 2022

Specifications
- Capacity: 340

Administration
- Diocese: Presbytery of Europe

St Andrew's Church was a congregation of the Church of Scotland in the British overseas territory of Gibraltar and was part of the Presbytery of Europe, until it closed in December 2022.

== The Building ==
The church had seating for 340, and was furnished with the original pews, pulpit and baptismal font. A pipe organ was added in 1905/06. On the south wall are three stained glass windows of considerable beauty. However, these date from 1953 as the previous ones were lost during the Bedenham explosion of 27th April 1951. The present memorable triptych stained glass window depicts images of St Andrew, Jesus Christ and St Columba.

The north wall of the kirk is adorned with several regimental plaques of battalions who had connections with the Church.

== History ==
In May 1852 a deputation headed by the Rev. Adam Cairns met the Secretary of State for War and the Colonies Sir John Pakington on the issue of celebrating Presbyterian marriages in Gibraltar. Subsequently, the foundation stone for St Andrew’s Church of Scotland was laid on 6 October 1852, before it opened for worship in May 1854.

The church was originally built as a garrison church for Scottish soldiers, who formed part of a number of Scottish regiments that were present in Gibraltar at the time, however it served the wider Presbyterian and Reformed Christian community of all nationalities.

The church was run by a Kirk Session of elders. Until its dissolution in 2002, the church shared its ministers with the Costa del Sol congregation in Fuengirola in Spain. As of June 2009, and until the Church's closure in December 2022, the church's minister was Rev. Ewen Maclean.

The church is located on Governor's Parade, a small square which they share with the Garrison Library, the O'Callaghan Eliott Hotel and the previous location of the Gibraltar Chronicle.

In December 2022 the building was closed as a Church of Scotland place of worship. A farewell service, attended by Sir David Steel, Governor of Gibraltar, took place on 20 November 2022.

The building was put up for sale by the Church of Scotland at an asking price of £1.3million in April 2003, and was sold for that amount to a Gibraltar registered company in the summer of 2023. The building remains under a protected status under Gibraltar’s Heritage and Antiquities Law, which will ensure that the listed building will continue to form an essential part of the territory's architectural heritage.

In November 2025, planning permission was approved for the Rock Sanctuary, a multi-faith community centre on the site of the former St Andrew’s Church.
