= Aswani =

Aswani is a name. Notable people with the name include:

- Aswani Kiran (born 1985), Indian volleyball player
- Aswani Rajbanshi, Indian cricketer
- Saloni Aswani, Indian actress
- C. Aswani Dutt (born 1950), Indian film producer
- Ibn Salim al-Aswani, Egyptian diplomat
