= Benady =

Benady is a Sephardic Jewish surname. Notable people with the surname include:

- Sam Benady (born 1937), Gibraltarian writer
- Tito Benady (1930–2026), Gibraltarian historian
