= Alberto Pizzarello =

Gibraltarian poet

Alberto Pizzarello was a Gibraltarian poet who wrote mainly in Spanish. He came from Catalan Bay and was affectionately known as "the poet-fisherman of the Rock" or "el poeta-pescador." His best known work is Mis poesías, an anthology of poems exploring his youth in Gibraltar and the years he spent in Madeira during the Second World War. The Spanish literary critic José Juan Yborra Aznar, writing for the Instiuto Cervantes, declared that Pizzarello "se perfila como un poeta autodidacta que se basa en la experiencia vivida, que, como la de muchos ciudadanos, estuvo marcada por la evacuación y el exilio forzoso, lo que llevó consigo la configuración de un espacio que termina poseyendo connotaciones muy peculiares en su localismo."(He emerges as a self-taught poet who is based on his lived experience, which, like that of many citizens, was marked by evacuation and forced exile, which led to the configuration of a space that ends up having very peculiar connotations in its localism.)
