= Pitto =

Pitto may refer to:

- Pitto (Game), a game also referred to as 'Seven Tiles'
- Alfredo Pitto, Italian footballer
