= Galliano (surname) =

Galliano is an Italian surname. Notable people with the surname include:

- Cecilia Galliano (born 1978), Argentine actress, model, and TV presenter
- Giuseppe Galliano (1846–1896), Italian army officer
- John Galliano (born 1960), British fashion designer
- Richard Galliano (born 1950), French accordion player
