= Mark Canepa =

American computer technology executive

Mark Canepa is an American computer technology executive.

== Biography ==
Canepa's educational background includes both a B.S. and M.S. in electrical engineering from Carnegie Mellon University, and he completed the University of Pennsylvania's advanced management program at the Wharton School.

Canepa held several manager positions in Hewlett-Packard from 1992 though 1996, including development and marketing. In 1995 he led HP's new workstation division in Chelmsford, Massachusetts formed after the acquisition of Apollo Computer.

He joined Compaq to lead its newly formed workstation division, in October 1996, but left after only a few weeks.

Canepa joined Sun Microsystems in October 1996. He served in multiple vice president and general manager roles, such as general manager of the workgroup server product group. He became executive vice president in April 2001 of a network storage products group, which became a data management group. His storage group leadership included the acquisition of Storage Technology Corporation (StorageTek) in 2005. He left Sun on May 15, 2006, and was replaced by David Yen, in a reorganization by Jonathan I. Schwartz. He joined Extreme Networks as CEO on August 30, 2006.

Canepa resigned as chief executive officer and as director of Extreme Networks on October 22, 2009. He joined the board of directors of GreenButton in September 2011. In 2013 he joined DataDirect Networks, including serving as a vice president.
