= Buhagiar =

Buhagiar is a surname concentrated mainly in Malta, which may be its originating country too. Notable people with the surname include:

- Antonio Maria Buhagiar (1846–1891), born Spiridion Buhagiar, Catholic bishop
- Francesco Buhagiar (1876–1934), Maltese politician
- Gio Nicola Buhagiar (1698–1752), Maltese painter
- Mario Buhagiar (1945–2026), Maltese author
- Richard Buhagiar (born 1972), Maltese-Australian professional footballer
- Tony Buhagiar (born 1955), Australian rules footballer
- Trent Buhagiar (born 1998), Australian professional footballer
- Valerie Buhagiar (born 1963), Maltese-Canadian actress, film director and television host
- Dragoș Buhagiar (born 1965), Romanian stage designer
