= Sevilla (surname) =

Sevilla is a Spanish surname that originates from the city of Seville, the capital of Andalusia, Spain.

== People with the surname ==
- Óscar Sevilla, Spanish-Colombian professional road bicycle racer
- Ernesto Sevilla, Spanish TV director, actor, comedian, screenwriter and TV presenter
- Carmen Sevilla, Spanish actress, singer, and dancer
- Gloria Sevilla, Filipina actress
- Bryan Matthew Sevilla, American pornographic actor who performs under the name James Deen
- Guillermo Sevilla Sacasa, Nicaraguan politician and diplomat
- Salva Sevilla (born 1984) Spanish footballer
- Soledad Sevilla (born 1944) Spanish painter
