= S. Debono =

Maltese scientist, linguist and philosopher

- Born: Malta
- Occupation: Philosophy

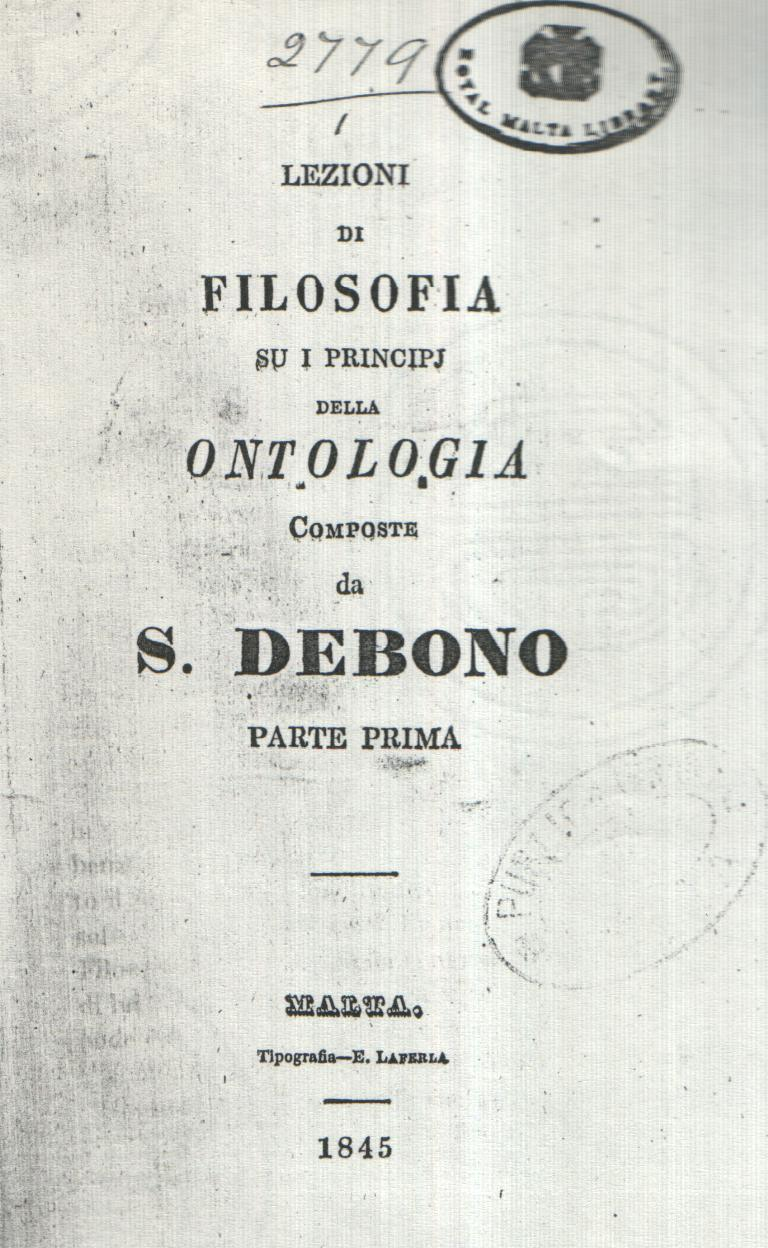
S. Debono's Lezioni di Filosofia (1845)

S. Debono (19th century) was a Maltese scientist, linguist and minor philosopher. In philosophy he mostly specialised in ontology. His exact Christian name is unknown. Neither do we possess as yet a portrait of him.

== Life ==
Details about Debono's personal life are still unidentified.

== Extant works ==
Only one philosophical work of Debono is known to exist: Lezioni di Filosofia su i Principi della Ontologia (1845). Another writing, insignificant to philosophy, is Note Grammaticali concernenti la Lingua Inglese (Grammatical Notes concerning the English Language; 1845).

Debono's Lezioni is a 415-page book in Italian published in Malta (at Tipografia E. Laferla). It is a great pity that this is just one of a multi-volume work, all of the rest have as yet not been discovered. The work opens with a preface and proceeds with 33 'lessons' (lezioni) organised in four sections, of which the first serves as a general introduction. The other sections deal successively with general metaphysics, special metaphysics, and moral philosophy

Debono insists on the central importance which concepts should have within the framework of 'erudite philosophy', and hence within the methods used to have understanding and acquire sure knowledge. In this context, Debono reveals his dislike of philosophical materialism, particularly that proposed by Spinoza, Schelling and Cousin.

In the preface, Debono expounds on the esteem which philosophy enjoys with regard to other sciences. This is derived from the nobility of its object, which Debono identifies with the human spirit. In the introduction (composed of eleven 'lessons') he explores the concepts on which philosophical teaching is based, and the objectives which such teaching tries to achieve. In the context, Debono deals with the concept of truth, the main principle of philosophy (the satisfaction of reason), the intellective method, syllogism, syllogistic argumentation, sophistry (two 'lessons'), the aim of rational thought, logical judgement, and the centrality of concepts to philosophy.

In the section dealing with general metaphysics (only four 'lessons'), Debono discusses the concepts of the structure (or organisation) of being and of truth as the correspondence to reality, causality, the inclinations of humans as contingent beings, and simple and composite being.

Next, in the part dealing with special metaphysics (eleven 'lessons'), Debono deals with the beginning and progress of philosophy, the world, destiny, natural and non-natural effects, humans, the non-elementary virtues of humans, the generation of the human spirit, the existence of God, and internal cult (as opposed to that external). One of these 'lessons' is dedicated entirely to Locke, in which Debono opposes him on all counts.

In the final section, that dealing with moral philosophy or ethics (in seven 'lessons'), Debono discusses religion, happiness as humans' highest end, the duties of scientists, on right behaviour (especially moderation), duties in general, genuine ethical mistakes, and the principal reason for acquiring knowledge and science.

== Sources ==
- Mark Montebello, Il-Ktieb tal-Filosofija f'Malta (A Source Book of Philosophy in Malta), PIN Publications, Malta, 2001.

== See also ==
- Philosophy in Malta
