= Carlos Cánepa (politician) =

Peruvian politician

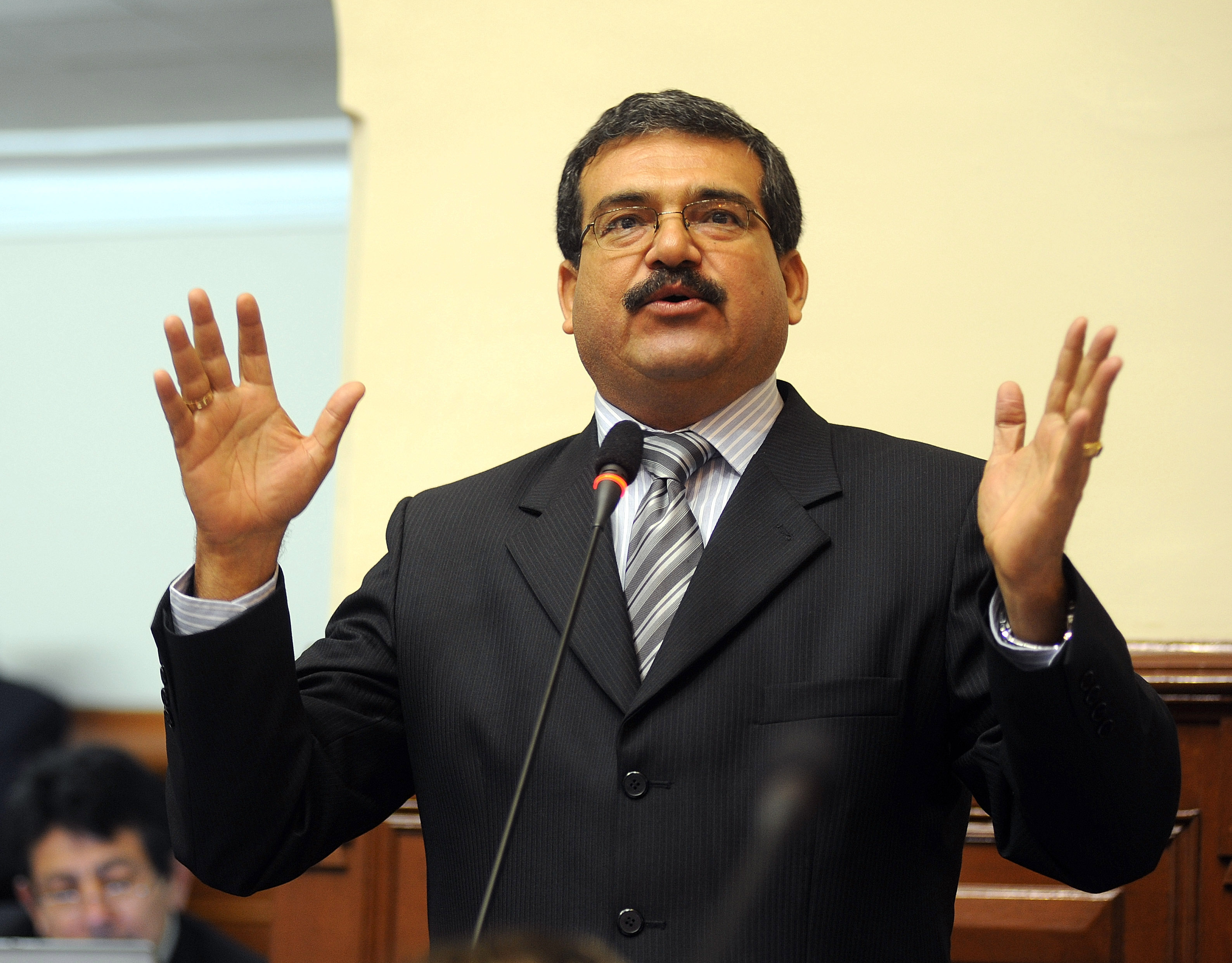

Member of Congress
- In office 26 July 2006 – 26 July 2011
- Constituency: Tumbes

Personal details
- Party: Union for Peru
- Occupation: Politician

Carlos Alberto Cánepa La Cotera is a Peruvian politician and a Congressman representing Tumbes for the 2006–2011 term. Canepa belongs to the Union for Peru.
