= Xerri =

Xerri is a surname of Maltese origin.

Notable people with the surname include:

- Bronson Xerri (born 2000), Australian rugby league footballer
- Dun Mikiel Xerri (1737–1799), Maltese patriot
- Joseph Xerri (18th century), Maltese theologian
- Tristan Xerri (born 1999), Australian rules footballer

== See also ==
- Xerri's Grotto, cave in Malta
- Scerri (surname), list of people with the name
