= Parties in the European Council during 2009 =

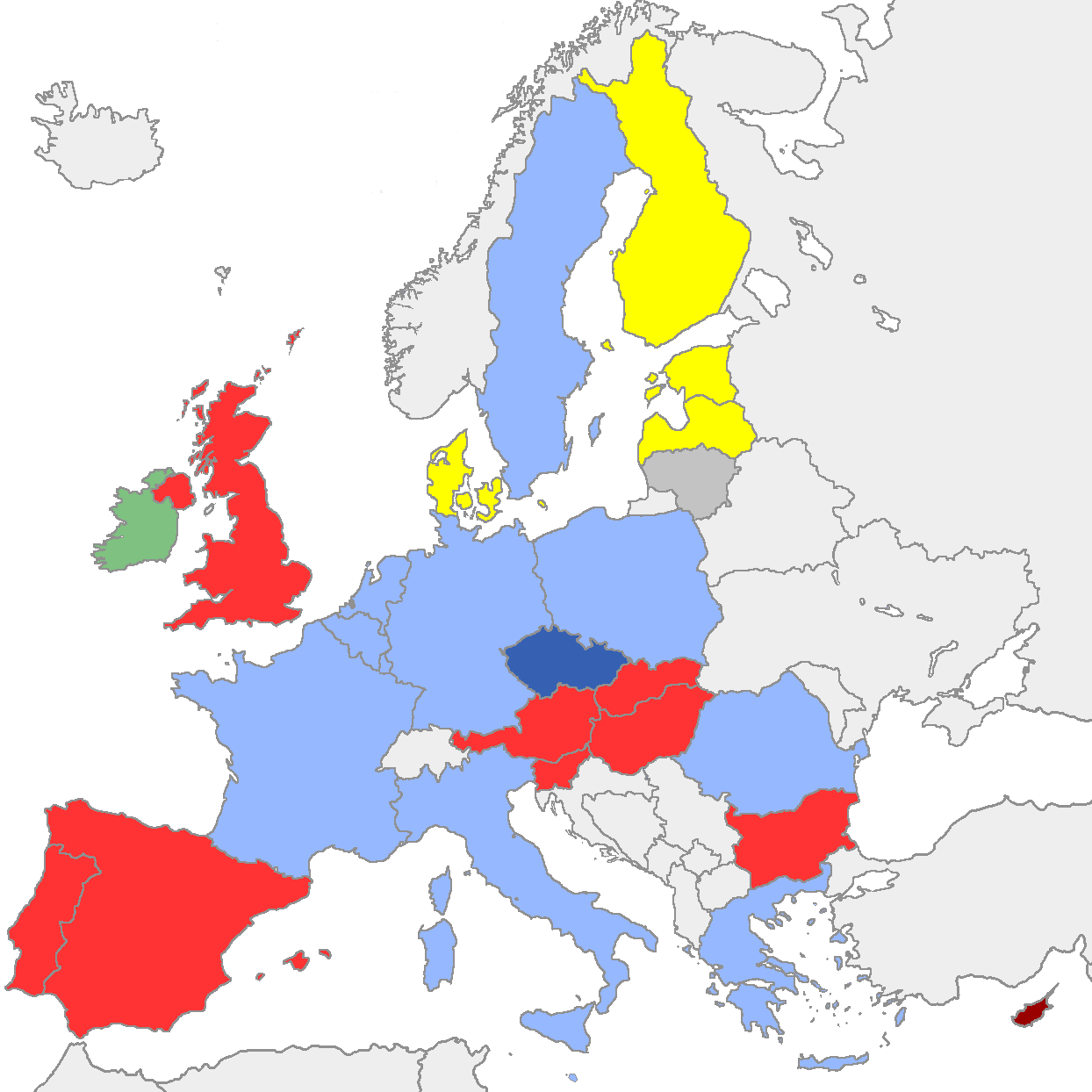
The member-states of the European Union by the European party affiliations of their leaders, as of 1 January 2009.

This article describes the party affiliations of leaders of each member-state represented in the European Council during the year 2009. The list below gives the political party that each head of government, or head of state, belongs to at the national level, as well as the European political alliance to which that national party belongs. The states are listed from most to least populous. More populous states have greater influence in the council, in accordance with the system of Qualified Majority Voting.

== Summary ==
Party	1 January 2009		12 March 2009		14 April 2009		16 April 2009		8 May 2009		27 July 2009		6 October 2009
Party	#	QMV	#	QMV	#	QMV	#	QMV	#	QMV	#	QMV	#	QMV
European People's Party	11	182	12	186	12	186	12	186	12	186	13	196	12	184
Party of European Socialists	8	111	8	111	7	99	7	99	7	99	6	89	7	101
European Liberal Democrat and Reform Party	4	22	3	18	3	18	4	25	4	25	4	25	4	25
Movement for European Reform	1	12	1	12	1	12	1	12	0	0	0	0	0	0
Independent	1	7	1	7	2	19	2	19	3	31	3	31	3	31
Alliance for Europe of the Nations	1	7	1	7	1	7	0	0	0	0	0	0	0	0
Party of the European Left	1	4	1	4	1	4	1	4	1	4	1	4	1	4

== List of leaders (1 January 2009) ==
Member-state	Votes	Leader	National party	European party
Germany	29	Angela Merkel	CDU	EPP
United Kingdom	29	Gordon Brown	Lab	PES
France	29	Nicolas Sarkozy	UMP	EPP
Italy	29	Silvio Berlusconi	FI	EPP
Spain	27	José Luis Rodríguez Zapatero	PSOE	PES
Poland	27	Donald Tusk	PO	EPP
Romania	14	Traian Băsescu	Independent	EPP
Netherlands	13	Jan Peter Balkenende	CDA	EPP
Greece	12	Kostas Karamanlis	ND	EPP
Czech Republic	12	Mirek Topolánek	ODS	MER
Belgium	12	Herman Van Rompuy	CD&V	EPP
Hungary	12	Ferenc Gyurcsány	MSZP	PES
Portugal	12	José Sócrates	PS	PES
Sweden	10	Fredrik Reinfeldt	M	EPP
Austria	10	Werner Faymann	SPÖ	PES
Bulgaria	10	Sergei Stanishev	BSP	PES
Slovakia	7	Robert Fico	SMER-SD	PES
Denmark	7	Anders Fogh Rasmussen	V	ELDR
Finland	7	Matti Vanhanen	Kesk.	ELDR
Ireland	7	Brian Cowen	FF	AEN
Lithuania	7	Valdas Adamkus	Independent
Latvia	4	Ivars Godmanis	LPP/LC	ELDR
Slovenia	4	Borut Pahor	SD	PES
Estonia	4	Andrus Ansip	RE	ELDR
Cyprus	4	Demetris Christofias	AKEL	PEL
Luxembourg	4	Jean-Claude Juncker	CSV	EPP
Malta	3	Lawrence Gonzi	PN	EPP

Supported by PD-L AKEL holds only observer status with the Party of the European Left.

== Changes ==
=== Affiliation ===
Date	Member-state	Leader	National party	European party
12 March	Latvia	Valdis Dombrovskis	JL	EPP
14 April	Hungary	Gordon Bajnai	Independent
16 April	Ireland	Brian Cowen	FF	ELDR
8 May	Czech Republic	Jan Fischer	Independent
27 July	Bulgaria	Boyko Borisov	GERB	EPP
6 October	Greece	George Papandreou	PA.SO.K.	PES

– Fianna Fáil, which held office under Brian Cowen, left the AEN and became an ELDR member.

=== Office-holder only ===
Date	Member-state	Leader	National party	European party
5 April	Denmark	Lars Løkke Rasmussen	V	ELDR
12 July	Lithuania	Dalia Grybauskaitė	Independent
25 November	Belgium	Yves Leterme	CD&V	EPP

=== National party changes ===
- On 27 March, Berlusconi's Forza Italia merged with other parties to form The People of Freedom. The successor party continued Forza Italia's EPP membership.

== See also ==
- Presidency of the Council of the European Union
