= Parties in the European Council during 2008 =

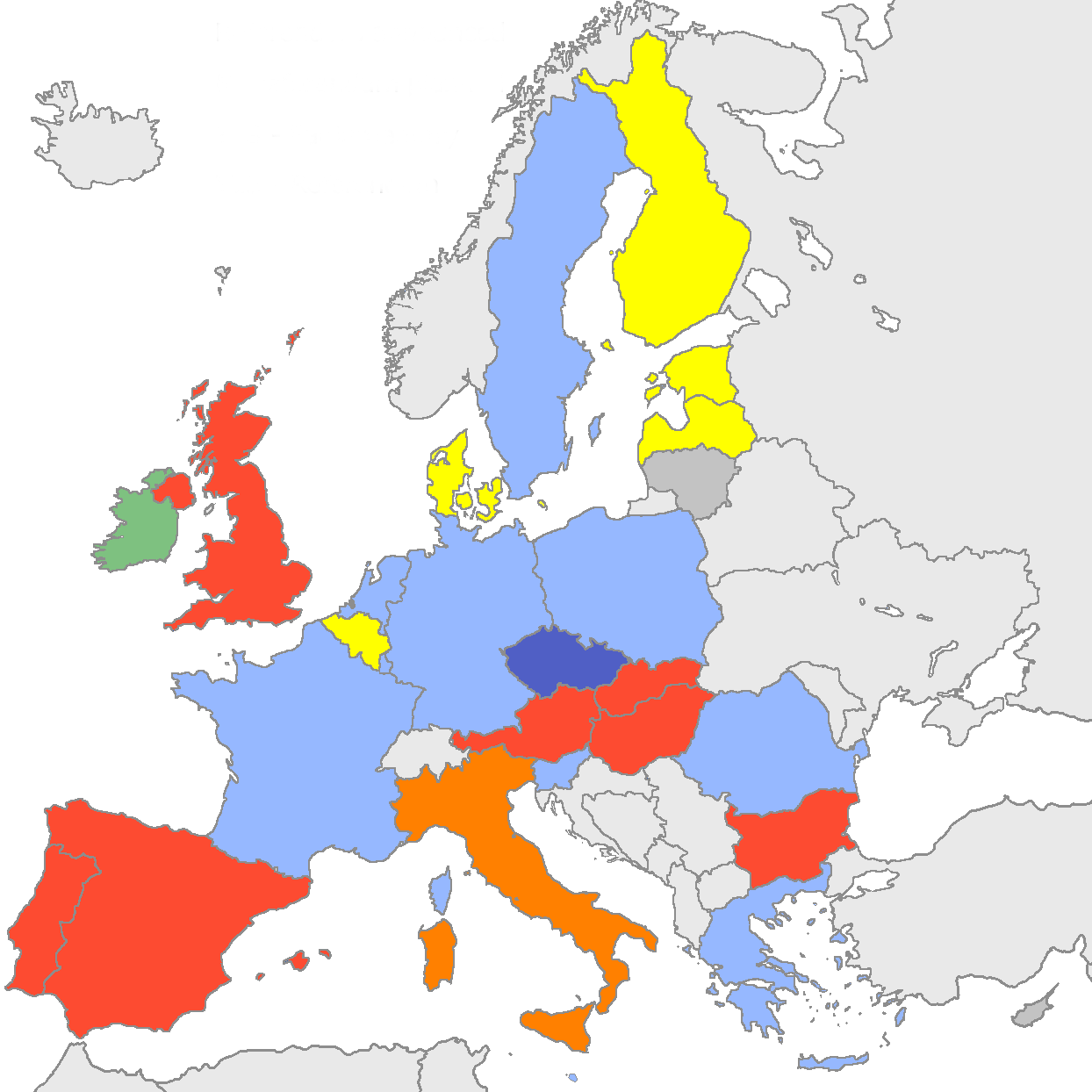
The member-states of the European Union by the European party affiliations of their leaders, as of 1 January 2008.

This article describes the party affiliations of leaders of each member-state represented in the European Council during the year 2008. The list below gives the political party that each head of government, or head of state, belongs to at the national level, as well as the European political alliance to which that national party belongs. The states are listed from most to least populous. More populous states have greater influence in the council, in accordance with the system of Qualified Majority Voting.

== Summary ==
Party	1 January 2008		28 February 2008		20 March 2008		8 May 2008		21 November 2008
Party	#	QMV	#	QMV	#	QMV	#	QMV	#	QMV
European People's Party	10	145	10	145	11	157	12	186	11	182
Party of European Socialists	7	107	7	107	7	107	7	107	8	111
European Liberal Democrat and Reform Party	5	34	5	34	4	22	4	22	4	22
European Democratic Party	1	29	1	29	1	29	0	0	0	0
Movement for European Reform	1	12	1	12	1	12	1	12	1	12
Independent	2	11	1	7	1	7	1	7	1	7
Alliance for Europe of the Nations	1	7	1	7	1	7	1	7	1	7
Party of the European Left	0	0	1	4	1	4	1	4	1	4

== List of leaders (1 January 2008) ==
Member-state	Votes	Leader	National party	European party
Germany	29	Angela Merkel	CDU	EPP
United Kingdom	29	Gordon Brown	Lab	PES
France	29	Nicolas Sarkozy	UMP	EPP
Italy	29	Romano Prodi	Independent	EDP
Spain	27	José Luis Rodríguez Zapatero	PSOE	PES
Poland	27	Donald Tusk	PO	EPP
Romania	14	Traian Băsescu	Independent	EPP
Netherlands	13	Jan Peter Balkenende	CDA	EPP
Greece	12	Kostas Karamanlis	ND	EPP
Czech Republic	12	Mirek Topolánek	ODS	MER
Belgium	12	Guy Verhofstadt	Open Vld	ELDR
Hungary	12	Ferenc Gyurcsány	MSZP	PES
Portugal	12	José Sócrates	PS	PES
Sweden	10	Fredrik Reinfeldt	M	EPP
Austria	10	Alfred Gusenbauer	SPÖ	PES
Bulgaria	10	Sergei Stanishev	BSP	PES
Slovakia	7	Robert Fico	SMER-SD	PES
Denmark	7	Anders Fogh Rasmussen	V	ELDR
Finland	7	Matti Vanhanen	Kesk.	ELDR
Ireland	7	Bertie Ahern	FF	AEN
Lithuania	7	Valdas Adamkus	Independent
Latvia	4	Ivars Godmanis	LPP/LC	ELDR
Slovenia	4	Janez Janša	SDS	EPP
Estonia	4	Andrus Ansip	RE	ELDR
Cyprus	4	Tassos Papadopoulos	DIKO	Independent
Luxembourg	4	Jean-Claude Juncker	CSV	EPP
Malta	3	Lawrence Gonzi	PN	EPP

Prodi's Democratic Party had yet to determine which European party it would belong to. Prodi's political background was on the Democracy is Freedom – The Daisy side of the PD's ancestry, and he personally was honorary president of Daisy's European parent, the EDP. Supported by PD-L DIKO's MEP is a member of the Alliance of Liberals and Democrats for Europe group in the European Parliament, but the party is not formally attached to any pan-European organization.

== Changes ==
=== Affiliation ===
Date	Member-state	Leader	National party	European party
28 February	Cyprus	Demetris Christofias	AKEL	PEL
20 March	Belgium	Yves Leterme	CD&V	EPP
8 May	Italy	Silvio Berlusconi	FI	EPP
21 November	Slovenia	Borut Pahor	SD	PES

AKEL holds only observer status with the Party of the European Left.

=== Office-holder only ===
Date	Member-state	New Leader	National party	European party
7 May	Ireland	Brian Cowen	FF	AEN
2 December	Austria	Werner Faymann	SPÖ	PES
30 December	Belgium	Herman Van Rompuy	CD&V	EPP

== See also ==
- Presidency of the Council of the European Union
