= Parties in the European Council during 2006 =

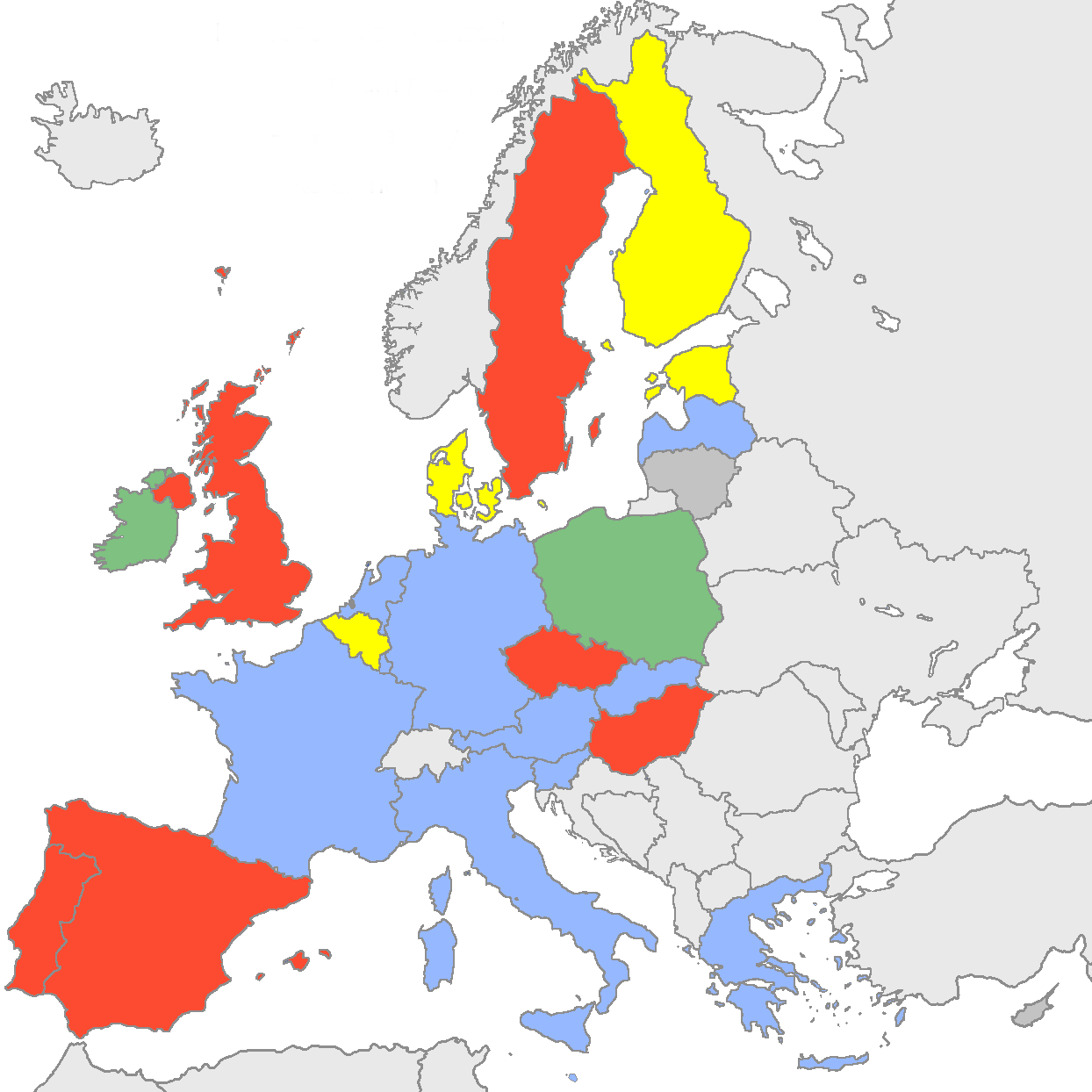
The member-states of the European Union by the European parliamentary affiliations of their leaders, as of 1 January 2006.

This article describes the party affiliations of the leaders of each member-state represented in the European Council during the year 2006. The list below gives the political party that each head of government, or head of state, belongs to at the national level, as well as the European political alliance to which that national party belongs. The states are listed from most to least populous. More populous states have greater influence in the council, in accordance with the system of Qualified Majority Voting.

== Summary ==
Party	1 January 2006		17 May 2006		4 July 2006		4 September 2006		6 October 2006
Party	#	QMV	#	QMV	#	QMV	#	QMV	#	QMV
European People's Party	11	144	10	115	9	108	9	108	10	118
Party of European Socialists	6	102	6	102	7	109	6	97	5	87
Alliance for Europe of the Nations	2	34	2	34	2	34	2	34	2	34
European Liberal Democrat and Reform Party	4	30	4	30	4	30	4	30	4	30
Independent	2	11	2	11	2	11	2	11	2	11
European Democratic Party	0	0	1	29	1	29	1	29	1	29
Movement for European Reform	0	0	0	0	0	0	1	12	1	12

== List of leaders (1 January 2006) ==
Member-state	Votes	Leader	National party	European party
Germany	29	Angela Merkel	CDU	EPP
United Kingdom	29	Tony Blair	Lab	PES
France	29	Jacques Chirac	UMP	EPP
Italy	29	Silvio Berlusconi	FI	EPP
Spain	27	José Luis Rodríguez Zapatero	PSOE	PES
Poland	27	Kazimierz Marcinkiewicz	PiS	AEN
Netherlands	13	Jan Peter Balkenende	CDA	EPP
Greece	12	Kostas Karamanlis	ND	EPP
Czech Republic	12	Jiří Paroubek	ČSSD	PES
Belgium	12	Guy Verhofstadt	VLD	ELDR
Hungary	12	Ferenc Gyurcsány	MSZP	PES
Portugal	12	José Sócrates	PS	PES
Sweden	10	Göran Persson	SAP	PES
Austria	10	Wolfgang Schüssel	ÖVP	EPP
Slovakia	7	Mikuláš Dzurinda	SDKÚ	EPP
Denmark	7	Anders Fogh Rasmussen	V	ELDR
Finland	7	Matti Vanhanen	Kesk.	ELDR
Ireland	7	Bertie Ahern	FF	AEN
Lithuania	7	Valdas Adamkus	Independent
Latvia	4	Aigars Kalvītis	TP	EPP
Slovenia	4	Janez Janša	SDS	EPP
Estonia	4	Andrus Ansip	RE	ELDR
Cyprus	4	Tassos Papadopoulos	DIKO	Independent
Luxembourg	4	Jean-Claude Juncker	CSV	EPP
Malta	3	Lawrence Gonzi	PN	EPP

DIKO's MEP is a member of the Alliance of Liberals and Democrats for Europe group in the European Parliament, but the party is not formally attached to any pan-European organization.

== Changes during the year ==
=== Affiliation ===
Date	Member-state	Leader	National party	European party
17 May	Italy	Romano Prodi	Independent	EDP
4 July	Slovakia	Robert Fico	SMER-SD	PES
4 September	Czech Republic	Mirek Topolánek	ODS	MER
6 October	Sweden	Fredrik Reinfeldt	M	EPP

Prodi officially aligns himself only with his The Olive Tree coalition rather than any member-party, but he was previously a member of Democracy is Freedom – The Daisy's ancestor-party and is honorary president of its European parent, the EDP.

=== Office-holder only ===
Date	Member-state	Leader	National party	European party
14 July	Poland	Jarosław Kaczyński	PiS	AEN

== See also ==
- Presidency of the Council of the European Union
