= Parties in the European Council during 2007 =

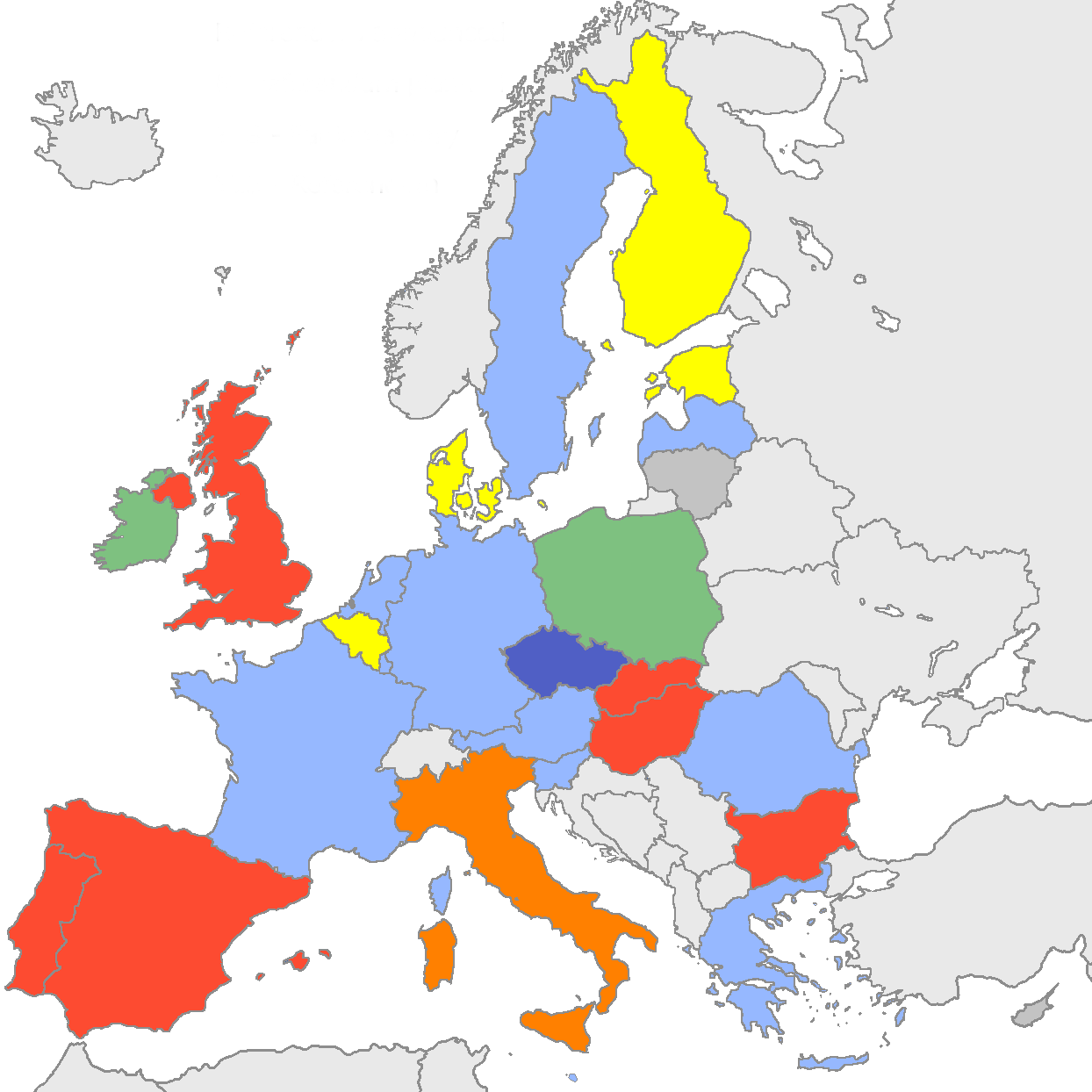
The member-states of the European Union by the European party affiliations of their leaders, as of 1 January 2007.

This article describes the party affiliations of leaders of each member-state represented in the European Council during the year 2007. The list below gives the political party that each head of government, or head of state, belongs to at the national level, as well as the European political alliance to which that national party belongs. The states are listed from most to least populous. More populous states have greater influence in the council, in accordance with the system of Qualified Majority Voting.

== Summary ==
Party	1 January 2007		11 January 2007		20 April 2007		23 May 2007		16 November 2007		20 December 2007
Party	#	QMV	#	QMV	#	QMV	#	QMV	#	QMV	#	QMV
European People's Party	11	132	10	122	9	108	10	122	11	149	10	145
Party of European Socialists	6	97	7	107	8	121	7	107	7	107	7	107
Alliance for Europe of the Nations	2	34	2	34	2	34	2	34	1	7	1	7
European Liberal Democrat and Reform Party	4	30	4	30	4	30	4	30	4	30	5	34
European Democratic Party	1	29	1	29	1	29	1	29	1	29	1	29
Movement for European Reform	1	12	1	12	1	12	1	12	1	12	1	12
Independent	2	11	2	11	2	11	2	11	2	11	2	11

== List of leaders (1 January 2007) ==
Member-state	Votes	Leader	National party	European party
Germany	29	Angela Merkel	CDU	EPP
United Kingdom	29	Tony Blair	Lab	PES
France	29	Jacques Chirac	UMP	EPP
Italy	29	Romano Prodi	Independent	EDP
Spain	27	José Luis Rodríguez Zapatero	PSOE	PES
Poland	27	Jarosław Kaczyński	PiS	AEN
Romania	14	Traian Băsescu	Independent	EPP
Netherlands	13	Jan Peter Balkenende	CDA	EPP
Greece	12	Kostas Karamanlis	ND	EPP
Czech Republic	12	Mirek Topolánek	ODS	MER
Belgium	12	Guy Verhofstadt	VLD	ELDR
Hungary	12	Ferenc Gyurcsány	MSZP	PES
Portugal	12	José Sócrates	PS	PES
Sweden	10	Fredrik Reinfeldt	M	EPP
Austria	10	Wolfgang Schüssel	ÖVP	EPP
Bulgaria	10	Sergei Stanishev	BSP	PES
Slovakia	7	Robert Fico	SMER-SD	PES
Denmark	7	Anders Fogh Rasmussen	V	ELDR
Finland	7	Matti Vanhanen	Kesk.	ELDR
Ireland	7	Bertie Ahern	FF	AEN
Lithuania	7	Valdas Adamkus	Independent
Latvia	4	Aigars Kalvītis	TP	EPP
Slovenia	4	Janez Janša	SDS	EPP
Estonia	4	Andrus Ansip	RE	ELDR
Cyprus	4	Tassos Papadopoulos	DIKO	Independent
Luxembourg	4	Jean-Claude Juncker	CSV	EPP
Malta	3	Lawrence Gonzi	PN	EPP

Supported by PD
Prior to 14 October, Prodi had officially aligned himself only with his The Olive Tree coalition rather than any member-party, but he had previously been a member of Democracy is Freedom – The Daisy's ancestor-party and was honorary president of its European parent, the EDP.
DIKO's MEP is a member of the Alliance of Liberals and Democrats for Europe group in the European Parliament, but the party is not formally attached to any pan-European organization.

== Changes ==
=== Affiliation ===
Date	Member-state	Leader	National party	European party
11 January	Austria	Alfred Gusenbauer	SPÖ	PES
20 April	Romania	Nicolae Văcăroiu	PSD	PES
23 May	Romania	Traian Băsescu	Independent	EPP
16 November	Poland	Donald Tusk	PO	EPP
20 December	Latvia	Ivars Godmanis	LPP/LC	ELDR

Supported by PD

=== Office-holder only ===
Date	Member-state	New Leader	National party	European party
16 May	France	Nicolas Sarkozy	UMP	EPP
27 June	United Kingdom	Gordon Brown	Labour	PES

=== National party changes ===
- On 14 October, Prodi's governing The Olive Tree coalition of parties merged into a single Democratic Party. The successor party had yet to determine whether it would continue Daisy's EDP membership; Prodi remained aligned on an individual basis with the EDP.

== See also ==
- Presidency of the Council of the European Union
