= Parties in the European Council during 2002 =

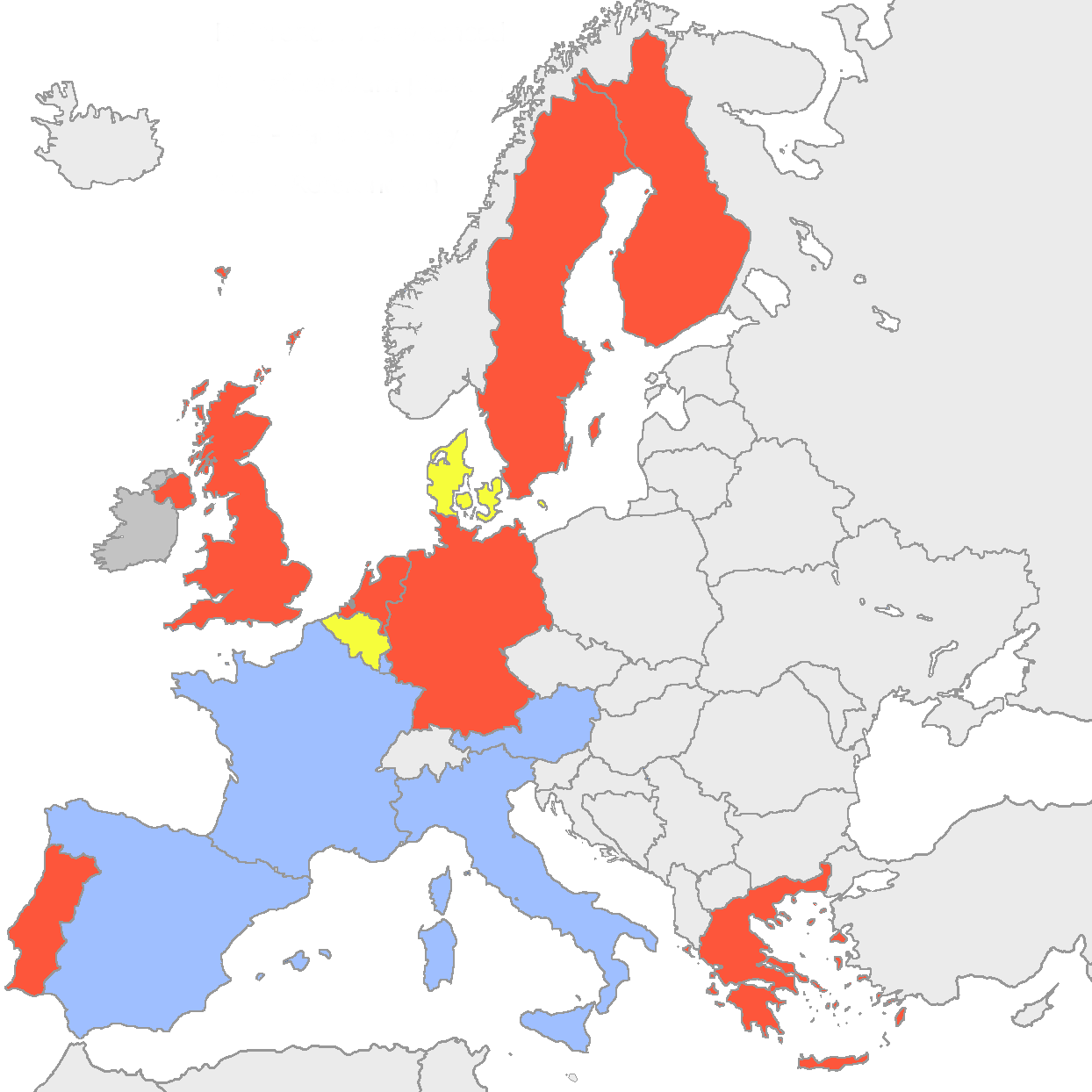
The member-states of the European Union by the European party affiliations of their leaders, as of 1 January 2002.

This article describes the party affiliations of the leaders of each member-state represented in the European Council during the year 2002. The list below gives the political party that each head of government, or head of state, belonged to at the national level, as well as the European political alliance to which that national party belonged. The states are listed from most to least populous. More populous states have greater influence in the council, in accordance with the system of Qualified Majority Voting.

During the period in question there were changes of the governing party in Portugal and the Netherlands, with PES parties in both getting replaced by EPP parties. This prompted a reversal of which party held a plurality of seats on the council; the EPP maintained that plurality until 11 January 2007, when the government change in Austria returned the plurality to PES.

== Summary ==
Party	1 January 2002		6 April 2002		25 June 2002		22 July 2002
Party	#	QMV	#	QMV	#	QMV	#	QMV
Party of European Socialists	7	42	6	38	6	38	5	32
European People's Party	5	34	6	39	6	39	7	44
European Liberal Democrat and Reform Party	2	8	2	8	2	8	2	8
Independent	1	3	1	3	0	0	0	0
Alliance for Europe of the Nations	—	—	—	—	1	3	1	3

== List of leaders (1 January 2002) ==
Member-state	Votes	Leader	National party	European party
Germany	10	Gerhard Schröder	SPD	PES
France	10	Jacques Chirac	RPR	EPP
United Kingdom	10	Tony Blair	Lab	PES
Italy	10	Silvio Berlusconi	FI	EPP
Spain	8	José María Aznar	PP	EPP
Netherlands	5	Wim Kok	PvdA	PES
Greece	5	Costas Simitis	PA.SO.K.	PES
Belgium	5	Guy Verhofstadt	VLD	ELDR
Portugal	5	António Guterres	PS	PES
Sweden	4	Göran Persson	SAP	PES
Austria	4	Wolfgang Schüssel	ÖVP	EPP
Denmark	3	Anders Fogh Rasmussen	V	ELDR
Finland	3	Paavo Lipponen	SDP	PES
Ireland	3	Bertie Ahern	FF	Independent
Luxembourg	2	Jean-Claude Juncker	CSV	EPP

== Changes ==
=== Affiliation ===
Date	Member-state	Leader	National party	European party
6 April	Portugal	José Manuel Barroso	PPD/PSD	EPP
25 June	Ireland	Bertie Ahern	FF	AEN
22 July	Netherlands	Jan Peter Balkenende	CDA	EPP

– The AEN is founded, with its membership including Ireland's Fianna Fáil, which held office under Bertie Ahern.

=== National party changes ===
- On 17 November, the governing French RPR merged with other right-wing parties to form the UMP. The successor party continued the RPR's EPP membership.

== See also ==
- Presidency of the Council of the European Union
