= Alliance for an Open Europe =

Eurosceptic and free market European political alliance

The Alliance for an Open Europe is a Eurosceptic and free market European political alliance, that includes representatives from political parties and think tanks.

== Founding ==
It was initiated by British Conservative Member of the European Parliament (MEP) Daniel Hannan, and its birth came in the midst of renewed questioning of the linkage between the centre-right European People's Party and the further-right eurosceptic European Democrats in the European Parliament. Hannan reportedly launched the Alliance with the intention of promoting national sovereignty, free trade and "maximum devolution of power".

Some have suggested that the organisation could become the nucleus of a new European political party or that its name be adopted by a newly independent EP group. The Alliance appears to have never received any official sanction from the respective party leadership of its participants, however. In December 2005, future Prime Minister of the United Kingdom, David Cameron (then new party leader of the British Conservatives) pledged to pull his party out of the European People's party in favor of the Alliance for an Open Europe. This move was criticized by former UK Conservative minister Anthony Nelson who argued that the leader of the Tory party "should occupy the centre ground and be inclusive not exclusive."

Delegates to its inaugural meeting on 5 December 2005 included representatives from the UK Conservatives, the Czech Civic Democratic Party, the Polish Law and Justice party and the French Rally For France.

== Uncertain future ==
In July 2006, the Movement for European Reform was announced, a broadly similar body, though with a formal mandate from the leadership of the British Conservatives and Czech Civic Democrats. In February/March 2007 the Bulgarian Union of Democratic Forces also joined the organisation.

== See also ==
- Movement for European Reform
- European Democrats
