= Parties in the European Council during 2003 =

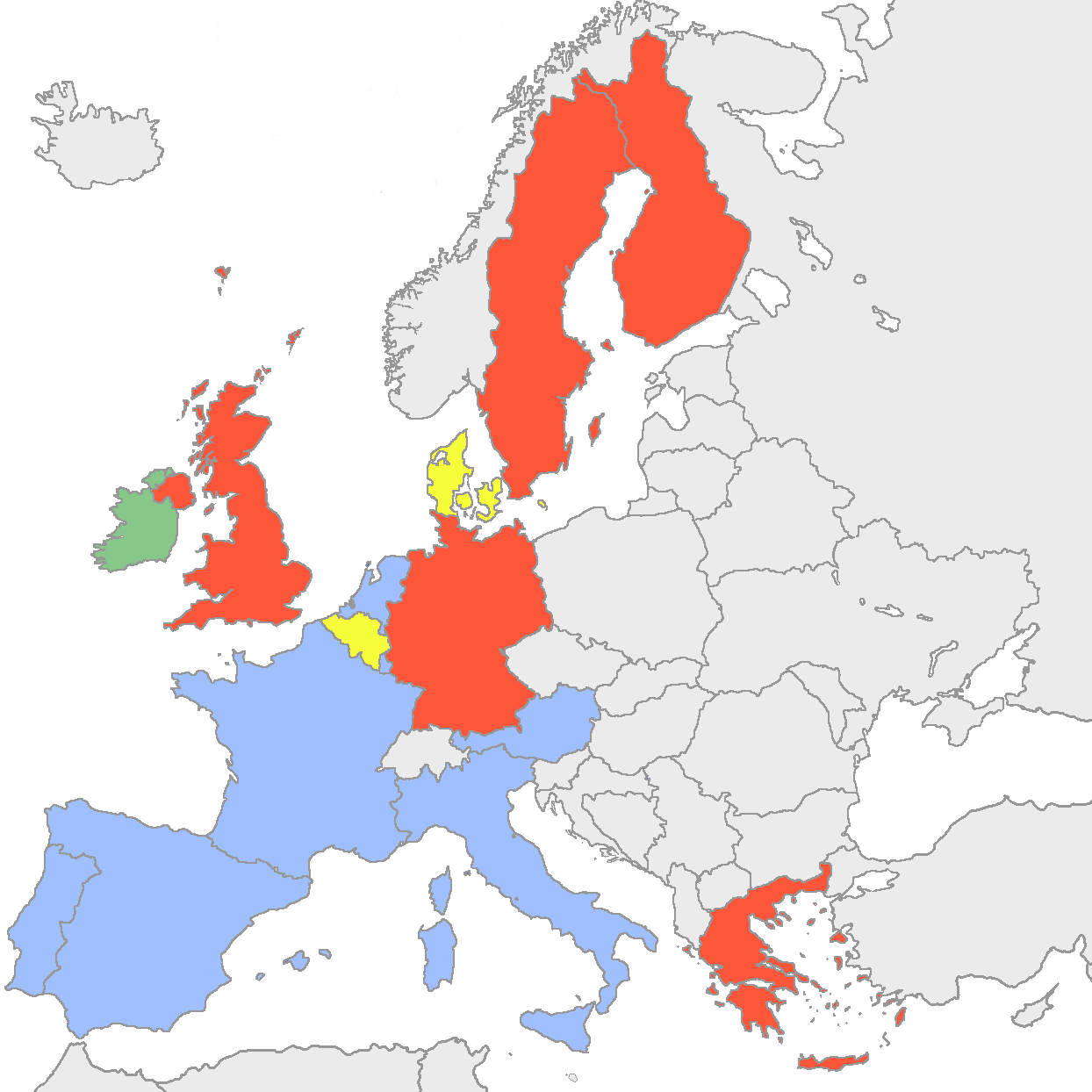
The member-states of the European Union by the European party affiliations of their leaders, as of 1 January 2003.

This article describes the party affiliations of the leaders of each member-state represented in the European Council during the year 2003. The list below gives the political party that each head of government, or head of state, belonged to at the national level, as well as the European political alliance to which that national party belonged. The states are listed from most to least populous. More populous states have greater influence in the council, in accordance with the system of Qualified Majority Voting.

During the period in question there was a change of the governing party only in Finland. In April Anneli Jäätteenmäki of the Centre Party succeeded Paavo Lipponen of the Social Democrats as State Minister (prime minister of Finland). She remained in office only until June when she resigned in a corruption scandal. She was succeeded by Matti Vanhanen from her own party.

== Summary ==
Party	1 January 2003		17 April 2003
Party	#	QMV	#	QMV
European People's Party	7	44	7	44
Party of European Socialists	5	32	4	29
European Liberal Democrat and Reform Party	2	8	3	11
Alliance for Europe of the Nations	1	3	1	3

== List of leaders (1 January 2003) ==
Member-state	Votes	Leader	National party	European party
Germany	10	Gerhard Schröder	SPD	PES
France	10	Jacques Chirac	UMP	EPP
United Kingdom	10	Tony Blair	Lab	PES
Italy	10	Silvio Berlusconi	FI	EPP
Spain	8	José María Aznar	PP	EPP
Netherlands	5	Jan Peter Balkenende	CDA	EPP
Greece	5	Costas Simitis	PA.SO.K.	PES
Belgium	5	Guy Verhofstadt	VLD	ELDR
Portugal	5	José Manuel Barroso	PPD/PSD	EPP
Sweden	4	Göran Persson	SAP	PES
Austria	4	Wolfgang Schüssel	ÖVP	EPP
Denmark	3	Anders Fogh Rasmussen	V	ELDR
Finland	3	Paavo Lipponen	SDP	PES
Ireland	3	Bertie Ahern	FF	AEN
Luxembourg	2	Jean-Claude Juncker	CSV	EPP

== Changes ==
=== Affiliation ===
Date	Member-state	Leader	National party	European group
17 April	Finland	Anneli Jäätteenmäki	Kesk.	ELDR

=== Office-holder only ===
Date	Member-state	Leader	National party	European group
24 June	Finland	Matti Vanhanen	Kesk.	ELDR

== See also ==
- Presidency of the Council of the European Union
