= 2009 European Parliament election =

- 4–7 June 2009

All 736 seats to the European Parliament and 18 observers 369 seats needed for a majority
- Turnout: 43.24% ▼2.4 pp
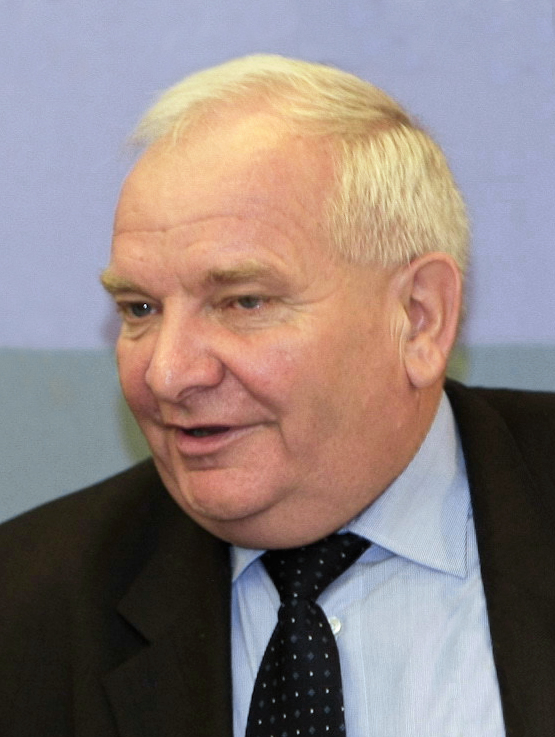

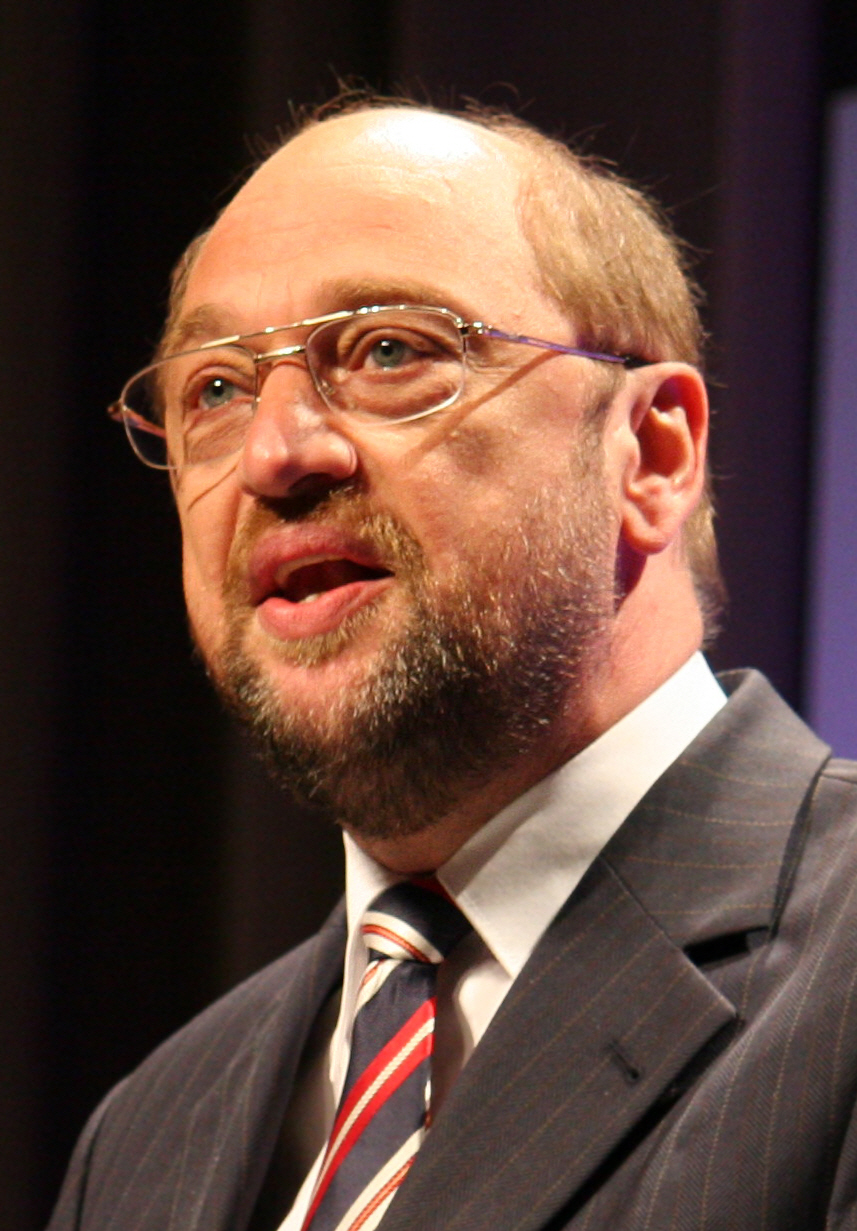

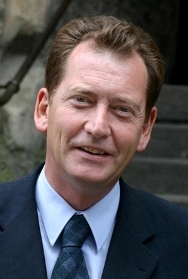

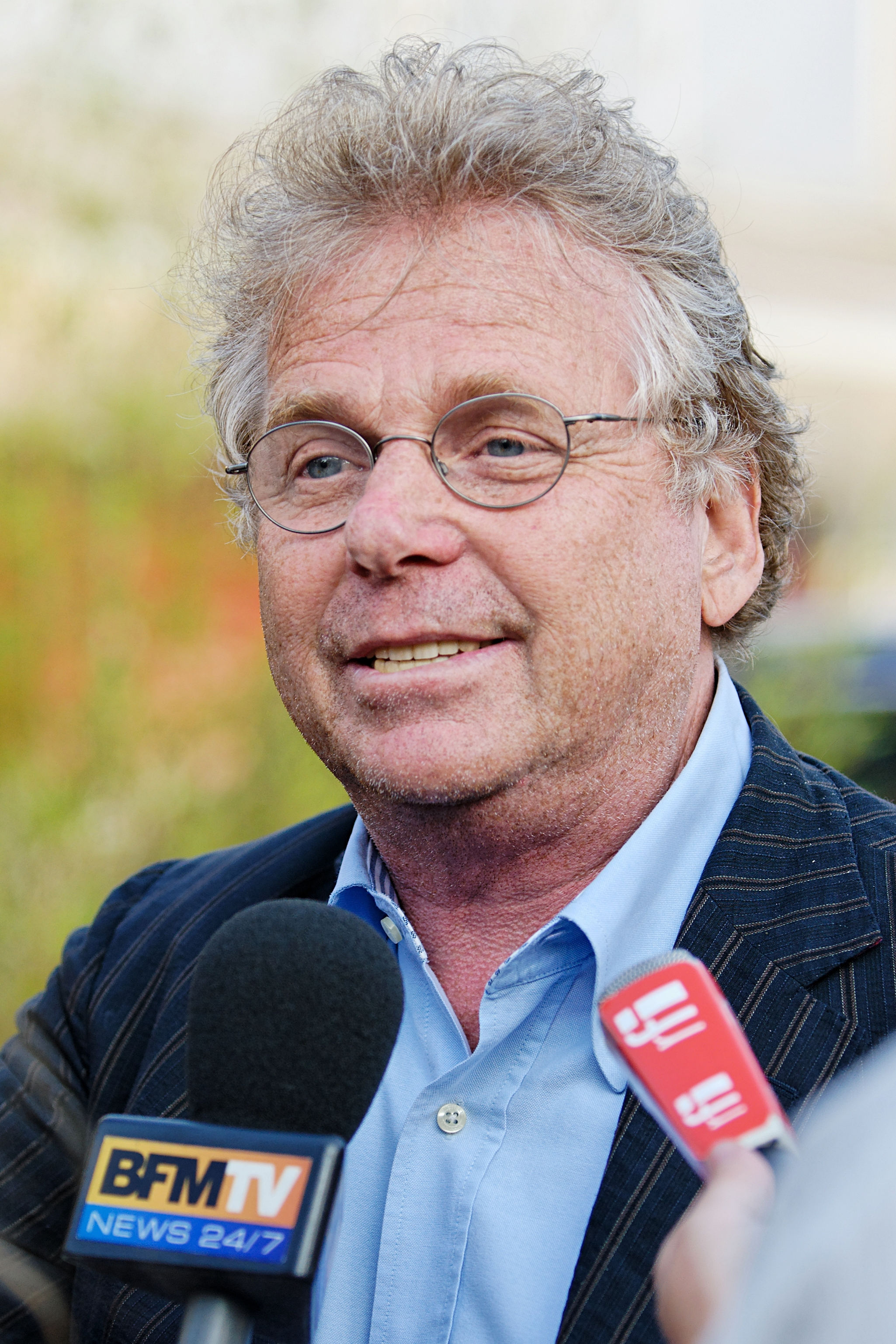

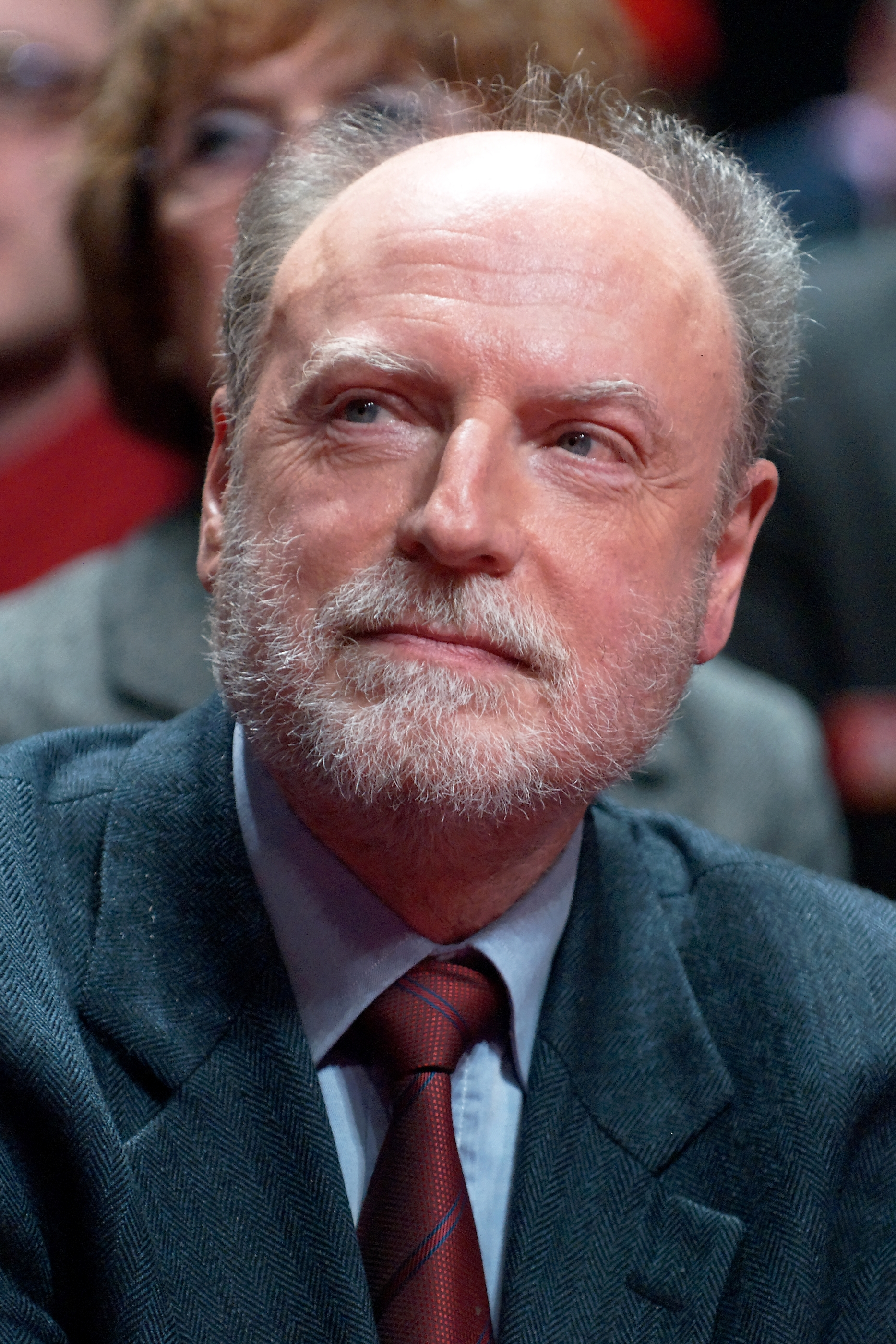

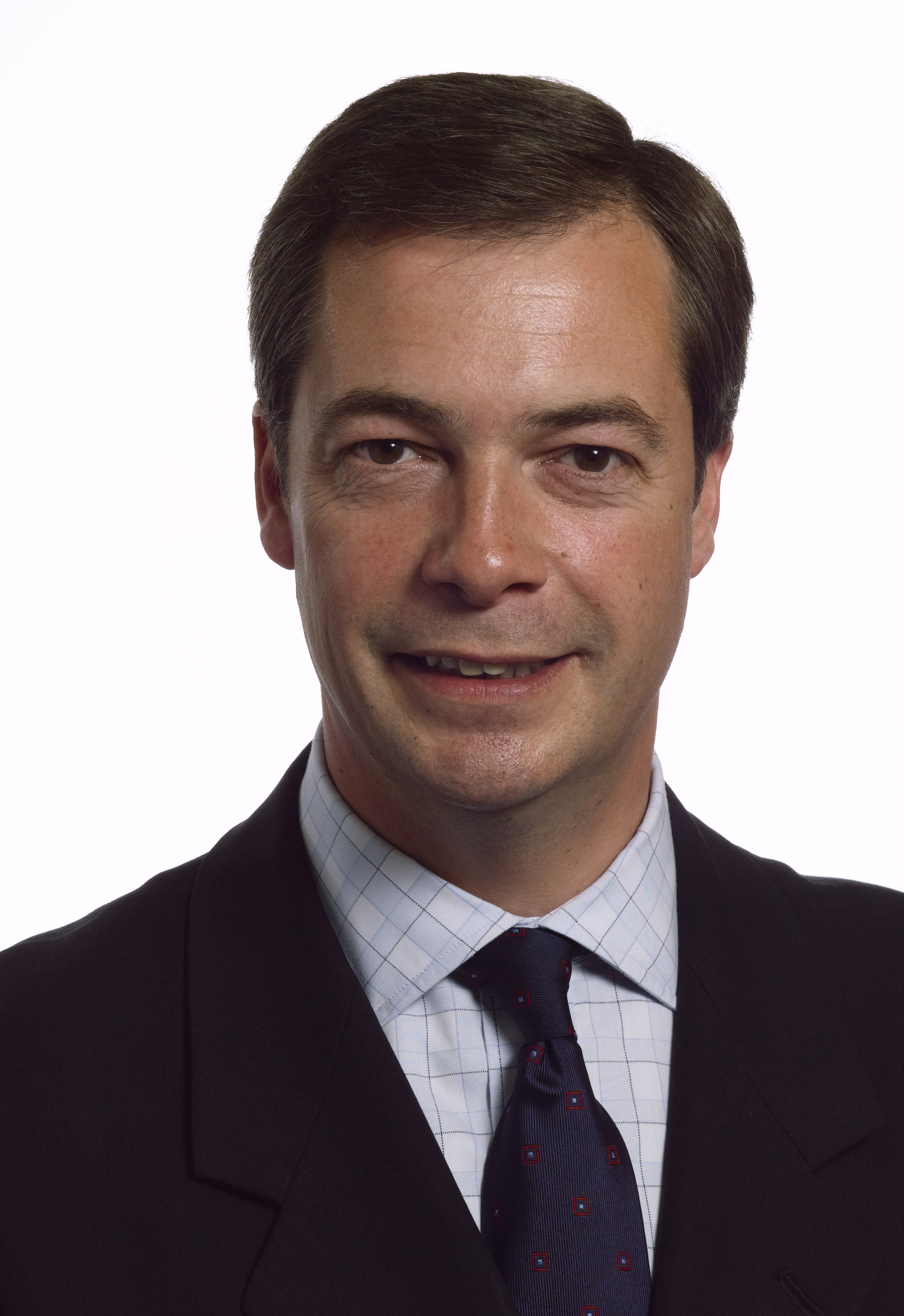
	First party	Second party	Third party
Leader	Joseph Daul	Martin Schulz	Graham Watson
Party	EPP	PES	ELDR
Alliance	EPP	S&D	ALDE
Leader's seat	East France	Germany	South West England
Last election	277 seats, 36.4%	218 seats, 27.2%	106 seats, 12.0%
Seats before	288	217	104
Seats won	265 (Note: 8 observers)	183 (Note: 5 observers)	84
Seat change	▼23*	▼34*	▼20*
Percentage	36%	25%	11.4%
Swing	▼0.7%	▼2.8%	▼1.8%
	Fourth party	Fifth party	Sixth party
		ECR
Leader	Daniel Cohn-Bendit	None	Francis Wurtz
Party	European Greens	MER	European Left
Alliance	Greens/EFA	ECR	GUE/NGL
Leader's seat	Germany	N/A	Île-de-France
Last election	42 seats, 5.7%	New group	41 seats, 5.6%
Seats before	42	N/A	35
Seats won	55 (Note: 2 observers)	54 (Note: 1 observer)	35
Seat change	▲13*	N/A	▼6*
Percentage	7.5%	7.3%	4.8%
Swing	▲2.1%	N/A	▼0.5%
	Seventh party
Leader	Nigel Farage
Party	UKIP
Alliance	EFD
Leader's seat	South East England
Last election	New group
Seats before	N/A
Seats won	32
Seat change	N/A
Percentage	4.3%
Swing	N/A
- Post-election composition of each member state's delegation * The number of seats was decreased from 785 to 736 – so this is a nominal figure
President of the European Parliament before election
Hans-Gert Pöttering
EPP–ED
President of the
European Parliament after election
Jerzy Buzek
EPP

The 2009 European Parliament election was held in the 27 member states of the European Union (EU) between 4 and 7 June 2009. A total of 736 Members of the European Parliament (MEPs) were elected to represent some 500 million Europeans, making these the biggest trans-national elections in history. An additional 18 observers ("virtual MEPs") were (supposed to be) pre-elected.

The majority of MEPs were elected on Sunday 7 June, but because of traditional polling days varying from country to country according to local custom, some countries held their elections in the three preceding days:

- Thursday 4 June: United Kingdom (including Gibraltar), Netherlands (including Aruba and the Netherlands Antilles)
- Friday 5 June: Ireland, Czech Republic (day 1)
- Saturday 6 June: Cyprus, France (for part of Outre-mer), Italy (day 1), Latvia, Malta, Slovakia, Czech Republic (day 2)
- Sunday 7 June: Austria, Belgium, Bulgaria, Germany, Denmark, Spain, Estonia, Finland, France, Greece, Hungary, Italy (day 2), Lithuania, Luxembourg, Poland, Portugal, Romania, Slovenia, Sweden

In seven EU member states, other votes occurred alongside the elections to the European Parliament: a general election in Luxembourg; local government elections in Latvia, part of the United Kingdom, parts of Germany, Italy, Malta, and Ireland (as well as two by-elections in Ireland, in Dublin Central and Dublin South); regional elections in Belgium; and a referendum on reforming the monarchical rules of succession in Denmark that would give women the same rights through equal primogeniture.

This was the first European Parliament election in which Bulgaria and Romania participated at the same time as the other member states. When those countries joined the EU in 2007, they held elections for MEPs outside the normal electoral calendar.

== Opinion polls ==
Voter turnout in the European Parliament election 2009

A poll sampling nineteen national polls predicted the following results: EPP 265 seats, PES 195, ALDE 95, GUE–NGL 40, Greens-EFA 35, UEN 35. The remaining 70 MEPs were not predicted, but about 20 were expected to be gained by far-right or Libertas candidates. IND/DEM was predicted to fade away due to Libertas' expected success.

A prediction by political scientists Simon Hix (London School of Economics), Michael Marsh (Trinity College Dublin) and Nick Vivyan (London School of Economics) foresaw little change in the distribution of seats, predicting 249 seats for the EPP, 209 for the PES, 87 for ALDE, 58 for UEN or the European Conservatives, 48 for GUE–NGL, 39 for Greens–EFA, 17 for IND/DEM (resulting in its dissolution) and 29 NI; Libertas was not expected to win any seats. A later prediction saw 262 seats for the EPP, 194 for the PES, 85 for ALDE, 53 for UEN or the European Conservatives, 40 for GUE–NGL, 50 for Greens–EFA, 23 for IND/DEM (resulting in its dissolution) and 29 NI.

== Apportionment of seats ==
At the previous election member states were granted a fixed allocation of seats for election as determined under the provisions of the Treaty of Nice (current allocation is in the 2007 column below). The admission of Bulgaria and Romania midway through the previous Parliament's term had increased the overall size of the assembly to 785, and under the terms of the Treaty of Nice it was mandated that the seat allocations be modified for this election, dropping 49 seats to keep the overall size of the Parliament down.

It had been the stated desire of the member-state governments to ratify the Treaty of Lisbon before the election so that its articles governing the European Parliament could enter force as of this election. However, this was blocked by the Irish rejection of the treaty in a referendum. Under Lisbon, there would be a somewhat different allocation of seats, with fewer seats eliminated, leading to a slightly different distribution totalling 751 MEPs. Were the Lisbon Treaty to be subsequently ratified, it was planned to give in advance, prior to the next elections, the additional seats to the countries that were to see an increase in representation under the provisions of Lisbon; this would bring the number of MEPs to 754 for a transitional period until 2014.

To have the additional MEPs ready at hand, 18 "phantom MEPs" were supposed to be elected at the election (which, however, did not happen in France). These were expected to get observer status in the European Parliament and full payment from the day the Lisbon Treaty entered into force (which did not happen either), but only to become full members of parliament if an additional protocol were ratified. The latter was to require a decision by the European Council.

Member state	2007	2009	Change
Germany	99	99	±0
Czech Republic	24	22	−2
Slovakia	14	13	−1
France	78	72	−6
Greece	24	22	−2
Ireland	13	12	−1
Italy	78	72	−6
Hungary	24	22	−2
Lithuania	13	12	−1
United Kingdom^{†}	78	72	−6
Portugal	24	22	−2
Latvia	9	8	−1
Spain	54	50	−4
Sweden	19	18	−1
Slovenia	7	7	±0
Poland	54	50	−4
Austria	18	17	−1
Cyprus	6	6	±0
Romania	35	33	−2
Bulgaria	18	17	−1
Estonia	6	6	±0
Netherlands	27	25	−2
Finland	14	13	−1
Luxembourg	6	6	±0
Belgium	24	22	−2
Denmark	14	13	−1
Malta	5	5	±0
Total:	785	736	−49

† – Includes Gibraltar, but not any of the other overseas territories or Crown dependencies.
Italicised countries are divided into sub-national constituencies.

Sources: Institutions: EP, Const. changes, Protocol 34.

== Campaign ==
Logo used by the European institutions

Many of the national parties running in the election are affiliated to European political parties. These pan-European parties included the EPP, PES, ELDR, EFA, European Greens, AEN, PEL, EDP and EUD. The question of which was the first to campaign transnationally is the subject of some debate, with the European Greens stating that they were the first in 2004. New parties that aspired to pan-European status during the 2009 elections include Newropeans, Europe United, Europe – Democracy – Esperanto and Libertas Party Limited. The role for pan-European political parties has been expanded by changes enacted by the European Commission in 2007 under the direction of Margot Wallström.

Four incumbent European Commissioners were to run as candidates in the election: Viviane Reding (Luxembourg, information society & media, Christian Social People's Party/EPP), Louis Michel (Belgium, development & humanitarian aid, Reformist Movement/ELDR), Danuta Hübner (Poland, regional policy, Civic Platform/EPP), Meglena Kuneva (Bulgaria, consumer protection, National Movement for Stability and Progress/ELDR). Ján Figeľ (Slovakia, education, training & culture, Christian Democratic Movement/EPP) was tipped to run but ultimately did not, instead seeking to become the new chairman of his party.

Kuneva later decided not to take up her seat in the European Parliament.

=== Issue-based campaigns ===
These divide into EU-wide and nationally based campaigns, often by non-governmental organisations focussed on specific policy areas. They are designed to influence MEP candidates, those with a strong interest in the issue, and voters in general. Examples of nationally based campaigns include those of the Royal College of Nursing and British Overseas NGOs for Development.

=== Media coverage ===
The European Parliament, National broadcasters, the EBU, with the cooperation of the Communication Commissioner, Margot Wallström, are jointly working to make the 2009 election more interesting to the public and increase turnout. Previously, diverse news media in the European Union, and the fact that the election takes place over several days, have made it hard to attract viewers. The media consortium is hoping to focus the 2009 election more towards the EU level and the European Parliament itself, hoping to make the election more interesting and cosmetically appealing for television viewers.

From 1 April Parliament started putting up election posters, internet banners and billboards encouraging people to vote, with messages such as "How much should we tame financial markets?" to demonstrate the role of Parliament. The same 10 posters, designed by Berlin-based advertising company Scholz & Friends Group, were translated into all 23 languages and have been deployed across the whole of the EU. However, some posters are put up more in countries where the issues they present are of more significance and the most posters will be put up in those countries which had the lowest turnout in 2004. The end slogan is "Use your vote in the European Parliament Elections" with the date of the election in that country. The entire campaign costs 18 million euros, or 0.05 euros per eligible voter, with Germany, Spain and Italy donating some advertising space free of charge.

== Role of the Treaty of Lisbon ==
It had initially been foreseen that the Treaty of Lisbon would have entered into force by the time of these elections, making them the first to be held under its provisions. However, primarily because of the No vote in the referendum in Ireland, the framework established by the Treaty of Nice was again used. The number of MEPs returned under the Nice rules was 736; this number would have increased to 751 if the Lisbon rules were in force.

A further change that Lisbon would have introduced was an increase in the powers of the Parliament, including powers over the appointment of the President of the European Commission. It had been suggested by some that political parties could run with candidates for the Commission President; with leaders now linking the post to elections and that convention having been enshrined in the Constitution, further encouraging the possibility.

In 2007, it emerged that the then-Commission President José Manuel Barroso would likely seek a second term, which he confirmed on 19 July 2008, and subsequently received the backing of French President Nicolas Sarkozy. In beginning to formalise the emerging party-political nature of the office, the centre-right People's Party backed Barroso as their candidate in early 2009. The centre-left socialists opposed the endorsement, but did not put forward their own formal candidate.

== Results ==
The national results as of 8 June 2009 are as follows. (based on predictions, to be confirmed)

=== Full members ===
736 members with full voting rights (the groups used are the groups they had been associated with directly prior to the elections):

Political group Country	EPP	PES	ALDE	Greens-EFA	EUL-NGL	UEN	ID	Other (incl. NI)	MEPs	Turnout	Cite
Austria	6 (ÖVP)	4 (SPÖ)		2 (Grüne)				3 (Martin); 2 (FPÖ)	17	45.97%	
Belgium	3 (CD&V); 1 (N-VA); 1 (CDH); 1 (CSP-EVP)	3 (PS); 2 (SP.A)	3 (OpenVLD); 2 (MR)	1 (Groen!); 2 (Ecolo)				2 (VB); 1 (LDD)	22	91%	
Bulgaria	5 (GERB); 1 (SDS); 1 (DSB)	4 (BSP)	3 (DPS); 2 (NDSV)					2 (Attack)	18	37.49%	
Cyprus	2 (DISY)	1 (EDEK)			2 (AKEL)			1 (DIKO)	6	58.88%	
Czech Republic	2 (KDU–ČSL)	7 (ČSSD)			4 (KSČM)			9 (ODS)	22	28.22%	
Denmark	1 (C)	4 (A)	3 (V)	2 (F)	1 (N)	2 (O)			13	59.5%	
Estonia	1 (IRL)	1 (SDE)	1 (RE); 2 (KE)					1 (Tarand)	6	43.9%	
Finland	3 (Kok.); 1 (KD)	2 (SDP)	3 (Kesk.); 1 (SFP)	2 (Vihr.)				1 (PS)	13	40.3%	
France	24 (UMP); 3 (NC); 2 (LGM)	14 (PS)	6 (MoDem)	14 (E-É)	5 (FG)		1 (Libertas)	3 (FN)	72	40.48%	
Germany	34 (CDU); 8 (CSU)	23 (SPD)	12 (FDP)	14 (Grüne)	8 (Linke)				99	43.3%	
Greece	8 (ND)	8 (PASOK)		1 (Greens)	2 (KKE); 1 (SYRIZA)		2 (LAOS)		22	52.63%	
Hungary	14 (Fidesz-MPP)	4 (MSZP)						3 (Jobbik); 1 (MDF)	22	36.28%	
Ireland	4 (FG)	3 (Lab)	3 (FF); 1 (Harkin)		1 (SP)				12	57.6%	
Italy	29 (PdL); 5 (UDC); 1 (SVP)	21 (PD)	7 (IdV)			9 (LN)			72	65.05%	
Latvia	1 (JL); 2 (PS)		1 (LPP/LC)	1 (PCTVL)		1 (TB/LNNK)		2 (SC)	8	52.57%	
Lithuania	4 (TS-LKD)	3 (LSDP)	1 (DP); 1 (LRLS)			2 (TT)		1 (LLRA)	12	20.54%	
Luxembourg	3 (CSV)	1 (LSAP)	1 (DP)	1 (Gréng)					6	91%	
Malta	2 (PN)	3 (PL)							5	78.8%	
Netherlands	5 (CDA)	3 (PvdA)	3 (VVD); 3 (D66)	3 (GL)	2 (SP)		2 (CU-SGP)	4 (PVV)	25	36.9%	
Poland	25 (PO); 3 (PSL)	7 (SLD-UP)						15 (PiS)	50	24.53%	
Portugal	8 (PSD); 2 (CDS–PP)	7 (PS)			2 (CDU); 3 (BE)				22	36.77%	
Romania	10 (PD-L); 2 (UDMR); 1 (Băsescu); 1 (Tőkés)	11 (PSD-PC)	5 (PNL)					3 (PRM)	33	27.67%	
Slovakia	2 (SDKÚ-DS); 2 (KDH); 2 (SMK)	5 (Smer)						1 (SNS); 1 (LS-HZDS)	13	19.63%	
Slovenia	2 (SDS); 1 (NSi)	2 (SD)	1 (LDS); 1 (Zares)						7	28.02%	
Spain	23 (PP)	21 (PSOE)	1 (CDC); 1 (EAJ-PNV)	1 (ERC); 1 (ICV)	1 (IU)			1 (UPyD)	50	46.0%	
Sweden	4 (M); 1 (KD)	5 (S)	3 (FP); 1 (C)	2 (MP)	1 (V)			1 (PP)	18	45.53%	
United Kingdom		13 (LAB)	11 (LD)	2 (GPEW); 2 (SNP); 1 (PC)	1 (SF)		13 (UKIP)	26 (CON/UCUNF); 2 (BNP); 1 (DUP)	72	34.48%	
Total	264	161	83	53	34	14	18	110	736	43.24%	
Political group	EPP	PES	ALDE	Greens-EFA	EUL-NGL	UEN	ID	Other (incl. NI)	MEPs	Turnout	Cite
Previous total (unadjusted)	288 (−24)	217 (−56)	100 (−17)	43 (+10)	41 (−8)	44 (−30)	22 (−4)	30 (+80)	785 (−49)		
Previous total (adjusted)	244 (+20)	196 (−35)	88 (−5)	40 (+13)	38 (−5)	24 (−10)	21 (−3)	85 (+25)	736 (±0)		

NB: "Adjusted" figures restate group numbers to proportionately reflect the reduction of the Parliament's size by 49, and to reflect the following political group movements announced prior to the election: DIKO (CY) from ALDE to Other; ODS (CZ) from EPP to Other; FF (IE) from UEN to ALDE; AN (IT) from UEN to EPP; PD (IT) from PES and ALDE to Other; PiS (PL) from UEN to Other; and Conservatives/UCUNF (UK) from EPP to Other.
Note:Postal votes missing from Slovenia. Complete results were supposed to be announced on 15 June

=== Observers ===
18 additional seats were designated to be filled by "observers" when the Lisbon treaty goes into force, to account for new seat distribution with the Lisbon Treaty. On 23 June an intergovernmental conference (IGC) of EU member states amended a protocol attached to the Lisbon treaty on transitional arrangements. Those transitional arrangements were originally envisaged as taking the total number of MEPs from 785 to 751 for the 2009 elections. The amended text says that the protocol "shall enter into force if possible on 1 December 2010". Germany was allowed to retain its three additional MEPs until the next elections in 2014.

The member states entitled to observer seats were supposed to make provisions before the 2009 elections for who would get the additional seats in the European Parliament. However, this was not done by France. This created a limbo for the observers elected from other countries, since all observers are supposed to start their work at the same time. In December 2011, they took their seats.

The following is a list of all observer seats

Country	National Party	Political Group
Austria	SPÖ	S&D
Austria	BZÖ	NI
Bulgaria	DSB (SK)	EPP
France	EÉLV	Greens-EFA
France	UMP	EPP
Italy	UDC	EPP
Latvia	PS	EPP
Malta	PL	S&D
Netherlands	PVV	NI
Poland	PSL	EPP
Slovenia	SDS	EPP
Spain	PP	EPP
Spain	UDC (CpE)	EPP
Spain	PSOE	S&D
Spain	PSOE	S&D
Sweden	S	S&D
Sweden	PP	Greens-EFA
United Kingdom	Conservatives	ECR

Note that this table already includes the grouping changes announced by the parties and reflected in the section below.

== Group changes ==
Traditionally, realignment between the different political groups and European political parties occurs in the runup to the election and in the time between the election and the first sitting of the European Parliament, when the political groups are constituted; the first sitting of the EP elected in 2009 is set for 14 July 2009.

New rules regarding the minimum number of members needed for a political group will come into effect following the 2009 election. The PES and EPP–ED had initially proposed to raise the limit for groups in the EP from 20 MEPs and one fifth of member states to 30 MEPs and a quarter of member states, which would effectively close down UEN (only MEPs from six countries) and I/D (only 22 MEPs). All five smaller groups (UEN and I/D plus ALDE, Greens–EFA and GUE–NGL) protested against these proposed changes. The proposal was voted down 15 to 14 in committee, and in an eventual compromise, new rules were approved in plenary on 9 July 2008 which require 25 MEPs from at least a quarter of the member states (i.e. seven member states). Although UEN and I/D still fail to meet the basic requirements of the new rules, the adopted compromise also included a provision allowing the continued existence of a group which had fallen below the threshold, but only if it still had members from at least a fifth of the member states and only if it had been founded at least a year before dropping below the threshold; if there is "sufficient evidence" of the abuse of this provision, it need not be applied.

=== Union for Europe of the Nations ===
The Union for Europe of the Nations (UEN) was a parliamentary group which traced its ancestry back to its origins as a Gaullist ideological alignment. It was not reconstituted following this election. The associated Alliance for Europe of the Nations (AEN) party lost MEPs to other groupings.

The largest single contributor of MEPs to the UEN group, the Italian National Alliance, merged with Silvio Berlusconi's Forza Italia party to form the People of Freedom (PdL) on 29 March 2009. The combined party belonged to the EPP and the MEPs elected in 2009 sat in that parliamentary grouping. This move came after a series of attempts by National Alliance to abandon more staunchly national conservatism and Eurosceptic parties and move towards the moderate European centre-right, including a previous application for EPP membership.

Ireland's Fianna Fáil joined the European Liberal Democrat and Reform Party (ELDR) on 16 April 2009. Fianna Fáil has long been a proponent of European integration and was openly uncomfortable about its European affiliation, with former leader Bertie Ahern often distancing his party from the right-wing positions of his groupmates and describing UEN as purely a "technical arrangement". Fianna Fáil very nearly joined ALDE during the group reshuffle after the 2004 European elections, and had also previously explored seeking membership in ELDR.

Other significant sources of the group's MEPs were Poland's Self-Defence of the Republic of Poland party and Latvia's For Fatherland and Freedom party subsequently joined the European Conservatives and Reformists group.

=== European Democrats ===
The European Democrats group, which had previously sat with the European People's Party's parliament group was dissolved after the election. The group's three political parties: the United Kingdom's Conservatives and Ulster Unionists and the Czech Civic Democrats, left to found the Alliance of European Conservatives and Reformists. The group's only other MEP, an Italian from the Pensioners' Party, failed to win reelection.

=== Socialist Party ===
The Italian Democratic Party was founded in 2007 from two parties in the Olive coalition decided to merge: Democrats of the Left and Democracy is Freedom – The Daisy a socialist and a liberal party respectively. The merged resulted in disagreements over which European political party the Democratic Party would belong to, with many former members of the Daisy party objection to member of the Party of European Socialists (PES). Eventually it was agreed that the party would sit with the PES in the European Parliament but not join the party. The new parliamentary grouping was originally going to be called the "Alliance of Socialists and Democrats for Europe", but this name was too similar to the name of the liberal group, the Alliance of Liberals and Democrats for Europe, so the name was changed to Progressive Alliance of Socialists and Democrats (S&D).

The Democratic Party (DIKO) of Cyprus, which had previously sat with Alliance of Liberals and Democrats for Europe joined the S&D after the 2009 elections, but remained outside of a European political party.

== Parliamentary groups 2009 ==
EPP (265) S&D (184) ALDE (84) Greens – EFA (55) ECR (54) EUL-NGL (35) EFD (32) Non-Inscrits (27)

The following changes occurred, which makes the make-up of the groups as follows:

- ALDE, Greens-EFA and EUL-NGL continue to exist.
- ECR is constituted
- PES becomes S&D.
- EPP-ED becomes EPP again
- I/D is replaced by EFD
- UEN is disbanded.

Political group Country	EPP	S&D	ALDE	Greens-EFA	ECR	EUL-NGL	EFD	NI	MEPs
Austria	6 (ÖVP)	4 (SPÖ)		2 (Grüne)				3 (Martin); 2 (FPÖ)	17
Belgium	3 (CD&V); 1 (CDH); 1 (CSP-EVP)	3 (PS); 2 (SP.A)	3 (OpenVLD); 2 (MR)	1 (Green!); 2 (Ecolo); 1 (N-VA)	1 (LDD)			2 (VB)	22
Bulgaria	5 (GERB); 1 (SDS); 1 (DSB)	4 (BSP)	3 (DPS); 2 (NDSV)					2 (Attack)	18
Cyprus	2 (DISY)	1 (EDEK); 1 (DIKO)				2 (AKEL)			6
Czech Republic	2 (KDU–ČSL)	7 (ČSSD)			9 (ODS)	4 (KSČM)			22
Denmark	1 (C)	4 (A)	3 (V)	2 (F)		1 (N)	2 (O)		13
Estonia	1 (IRL)	1 (SDE)	1 (RE); 2 (KE)	1 (Tarand)					6
Finland	3 (Kok.); 1 (KD)	2 (SDP)	3 (Kesk.); 1 (SFP)	2 (Vihr.)			1 (PS)		13
France	29 (UMP)	14 (PS)	6 (MoDem)	14 (E-É)		5 (FG)	1 (Libertas)	3 (FN)	72
Germany	34 (CDU); 8 (CSU)	23 (SPD)	12 (FDP)	14 (Grüne)		8 (Linke)			99
Greece	8 (ND)	8 (PASOK)		1 (Greens)		2 (KKE); 1 (SYRIZA)	2 (LAOS)		22
Hungary	14 (Fidesz-MPP)	4 (MSZP)			1 (MDF)			3 (Jobbik)	22
Ireland	4 (FG)	3 (Lab)	3 (FF); 1 (Harkin)			1 (SP)			12
Italy	29 (PdL); 5 (UDC); 1 (SVP)	21 (PD)	7 (IdV)				9 (LN)		72
Latvia	2 (PS); 1 (JL)	1 (TSP)	1 (LPP/LC)	1 (PCTVL)	1 (TB/LNKK)	1 (LSP)			8
Lithuania	4 (TS-LKD)	3 (LSDP)	1 (DP); 1 (LRLS)		1 (LLRA)		2 (TT)		12
Luxembourg	3 (CSV)	1 (LSAP)	1 (DP)	1 (Déi Gréng)					6
Malta	2 (PN)	3 (PL)							5
Netherlands	5 (CDA)	3 (PvdA)	3 (VVD); 3 (D66)	3 (GL)	1 (CU)	2 (SP)	1 (SGP)	4 (PVV)	25
Poland	25 (PO); 3 (PSL)	6 (SLD); 1 (UP)			15 (PiS)				50
Portugal	8 (PSD); 2 (CDS)	7 (PS)				2 (CDU); 3 (BE)			22
Romania	10 (PD-L); 3 (UDMR); 1 (Băsescu)	11 (PSD-PC)	5 (PNL)					3 (PRM)	33
Slovakia	2 (SDKÚ-DS); 2 (KDH); 2 (SMK)	5 (Smer)	1 (LS-HZDS)				1 (SNS)		13
Slovenia	2 (SDS); 1 (NSi)	2 (SD)	1 (LDS); 1 (Zares)						7
Spain	23 (PP)	21 (PSOE)	1 (CDC); 1 (EAJ-PNV)	1 (ERC); 1 (ICV)		1 (IU)		1 (UPyD)	50
Sweden	4 (M); 1 (KD)	5 (S)	3 (FP); 1 (C)	2 (MP); 1 (PP)		1 (V)			18
United Kingdom		13 (Lab)	11 (LD)	2 (GPEW); 2 (SNP); 1 (PC)	24 (Con); 1 (UCUNF)	1 (SF)	13 (UKIP)	2 (BNP); 1 (DUP); 1 (Con)	72
Total	265	184	84	55	54	35	32	27	736

Seats summary
EPP	36.01%
S&D	25.00%
ALDE	11.41%
G–EFA	7.47%
ECR	7.34%
GUE/NGL	4.76%
EFD	4.35%
NI	3.67%

== Parliament president ==
In the first vote of the new Parliament Jerzy Buzek (EPP, Poland) was elected Parliament President, winning with 555 to 89 votes over his opponent Eva-Britt Svensson (EUL-NGL, Sweden).

The two candidates were:

- For the right of centre European People's Party, former Polish PM Jerzy Buzek was nominated by his group EPP-ED and supported by the PES and ALDE groups.
- On the left, Swedish MEP Eva Britt Svensson was nominated by her group EUL-NGL.

MEPs voted in a secret ballot on Tuesday morning 14 July 2009.

The two largest groups in Parliament, the EPP-ED and PES, agreed to share the post of President of the European Parliament as they have done for all but two terms of Parliament. The first half of the term was taken by Jerzy Buzek MEP of the EPP, who was the first MEP from Eastern Europe to hold the post. He passed it over to Martin Schulz MEP, the current leader of PES. The deal got support form The ALDE group (their candidate Graham Watson dropped out from the race).

The other official candidate was Eva-Britt Svensson, nominated from EUL-NGL. She campaigned with the slogan "a different voice". She was the first MEP from Sweden to candidate to the position.
