= European Democrats =

Former conservative political group of the European Parliament

- European Parliament group
- Name: European Democrats
- English abbr.: ED
- French abbr.: DE
- Formal name: European Democratic Group
- Ideology: Conservatism; Economic liberalism Euroscepticism
- Political position: Centre-right to right-wing
- From: 17 July 1979
- To: 1 May 1992
- Preceded by: European Conservative Group
- Succeeded by: European People's Party–European Democrats
- Chaired by: James Scott-Hopkins, Henry Plumb, Christopher Prout
- MEP(s): 63 (17 July 1979); 50 (23 July 1984); 34 (25 July 1989)

The European Democratic Group, more commonly known as European Democrats, was a conservative political group that operated in the European Parliament between 1979 and 1992. At its height in July 1979, it had 63 MEPs.

Ideologically, ED was more Eurosceptic and right-wing than its centre-right rival European People's Party (EPP). Its members included parties such as the UK Conservative Party of Margaret Thatcher, Danish Conservative People's Party, and Spanish People's Alliance. In 1992, ED became a subgroup of EPP, now the European People's Party–European Democrats. ED split from EPP in 2009 to re-create the group as the Alliance of European Conservatives and Reformists.

== European Democrats in the European Parliament ==
=== 1979–1992 ===
The European Democratic Group (ED) was formed on 17 July 1979 by British Conservative Party, Danish Conservative People's Party and other MEPs after their success in the 1979 elections. It supplanted the earlier European Conservative Group.

In the late seventies and early eighties, the ED was the third-largest political group in the European Parliament.

However, the group saw its membership fall sharply in the late 1980s, as many centre-right members moved to the rival European People's Party (EPP), dominated by the Christian Democratic Union of Germany (CDU), Italian Christian Democrats and the ideology of Christian democracy in general. The ED had been somewhat further from the political centre and less pro-European than the EPP. Largely isolated, even hardline eurosceptics like Margaret Thatcher conceded that the British Conservatives could not be effectively heard from such a peripheral group.

=== 1992–1999 ===
On 1 May 1992, the ED (now largely composed of UK Conservative Party members) dissolved, and its remaining members were accorded "associated party" status in the European People's Party Group (EPP Group); that is, being part of the parliamentary group without retaining actual membership in the European People's Party (EPP) itself. This was considered essential for the Conservatives, as the EPP was generally seen as quite favourable to European integration, a stance at odds with their core ideology. The Conservatives' relationship to the EPP would become a sore point in the following years, particularly for the eurosceptic general membership in Britain. Then-leader of the British Conservative Party William Hague hoped to put the issue to rest by negotiating a new arrangement in 1999 by which the EPP's parliamentary group would rebrand itself as the European People's Party–European Democrats (EPP-ED), with the "European Democrat" nomenclature returning after a seven-year hiatus. This was intended to nominally underscore the Conservatives' status apart from the rest of EPP, and it was hoped that with the coming enlargement of the European Union numerous newly involved right-wing parties, averse to the EPP proper for its perceived European federalism, would be willing to instead enter the ED subgroup, growing the overall alignment.

=== 1999–2009 ===
The arrangement proved to do little to appease opposition. Hague's successor, Iain Duncan Smith, made a concerted drive at one point to resurrect the European Democratic Group, but backed off when it became clear that Conservative MEPs would not move voluntarily. The hope that multiple Central and European parties would join ED also proved to be dubious, as only the Czech Civic Democratic Party took up the offer, with the remainder joining EPP proper or other groups such as Union for Europe of the Nations (UEN) or Independence and Democracy (IND/DEM). Meanwhile, the ED remained a more eurosceptic subgroup within the broader EPP-ED bloc that contributed slightly more than 10% of its total MEPs. It resisted the trend of incorporating as a European political party.

During the 2005 Conservative leadership contest, eventual winner David Cameron pledged to withdraw the Conservatives from the EPP-ED group, while opponent David Davis argued in a letter to the editor of The Daily Telegraph that the current ED arrangement allowed the Conservatives to maintain suitable distance from EPP while still having influence in the largest parliamentary grouping. Conservative/EPP-ED MEP Martin Callanan responded in that paper the following day:

SIR - David Davis (Letter, November 10) is sadly misinformed about our Conservative MEPs' relationship with the European People's Party (EPP) in the European Parliament. He claims that "Conservatives are members of the European Democrat group, which forms an alliance with the EPP". In reality, though, the ED does not exist. It has no staff or money and is, in effect, a discussion group within the EPP. […] Far from being a symbolic step, as Mr Davis suggests, leaving the EPP is the one hard, bankable commitment to have come out of this leadership campaign.

The Czech Civic Democratic Party (ODS), the Law and Justice (PiS) of Poland and the Rally For France party were among the first to discuss forming a breakaway group under the Movement for European Reform. Sir Reg Empey, Leader of the Ulster Unionist Party (UUP) has committed his party thereunto Its position would be that the European Union should exist, but as a looser supranational organisation than at present, making the group less eurosceptic than the UEN and IND/DEM groups. Some members from the above parties founded a new organisation, the Alliance for an Open Europe, in the midst of this debate, with broadly similar objectives.

Cameron initially intended to form the new group in 2006, though this aspiration had to be cancelled due to their main prospective partners, the ODS and PiS, being unable or unwilling to break away from their then-groupings; the new grouping was put on hiatus until the 2009 European elections. By then, new factors—including the collapse of the UEN group—made conditions for forming a new political grouping much more favourable. On 22 June 2009, the founder members of the European Conservatives and Reformists Group (ECR Group), all signatories of the Prague Declaration announced that they were to leave the EPP-ED, and in virtue of that fact, the European Democrats movement. This announcement ended the 30-year existence of the European Democrats in the European Parliament.

=== Members ===
The following political parties were associated with the European Democrats at some point:

Country	Name		Ideology	Membership
United Kingdom	Conservative Party	Conservatives	Conservatism; Euroscepticism	17 July 1979–22 June 2009
United Kingdom	Ulster Unionist Party	UUP	Conservatism; British unionism	20 July 1999–22 June 2009
Denmark	Conservative People's Party	DKF	Liberal conservatism Social conservatism	17 July 1979–22 June 2009
Spain	People's Alliance	AP	Liberal conservatism National conservatism	10 June 1987–25 July 1989
Italy	Pensioners' Party	PP	Conservatism; Soft Euroscepticism	20 July 1999–22 June 2009
Czech Republic	Civic Democratic Party	ODS	National conservatism Soft Euroscepticism	14 July 2004–22 June 2009
Portugal	CDS – People's Party	CDS–PP	Christian democracy National conservatism	14 July 2004–22 June 2009

== European Democrats in PACE (Parliamentary Assembly of the Council of Europe) ==
The European Democrat Group in the Parliamentary Assembly of the Council of Europe was founded as the Group of Independent Representatives in 1970 by British and Scandinavian members of PACE, having about 35–40 members from the UK, Ireland, Norway, Denmark, Turkey, Sweden and Switzerland. It adopted the European Democrats Group name in September 1980, later becoming the European Conservatives Group in 2014.

== Sources ==
- Political Groups of the European Parliament
- Development of Political Groups in the European Parliament
- Europe Politique
- European Parliament MEP Archives
- Democracy in the European Parliament

== See also ==
- Alliance for an Open Europe
- Movement for European Reform
- European People's Party–European Democrats
