= European Conservatives =

Former conservative political group of the European Parliament

- European Parliament group
- Name: European Conservatives
- English abbr.: C
- Formal name: European Conservative Group
- Ideology: Conservatism
- Political position: Centre-right
- From: 16 January 1973
- To: 17 July 1979
- Succeeded by: European Democratic Group
- Chaired by: Kent S. Kirk, Geoffrey Rippon
- MEP(s): 63 (7 July 1979)

The European Conservative Group was a conservative political group that operated in the European Parliament between 1973 and 1979. At its height in July 1979, it had 63 MEPs.

== History ==
On 1 January 1973 the Community enlarged for the first time to include Denmark, Republic of Ireland and the United Kingdom. The British Conservative Party and Danish Conservative People's Party formed their own group called the European Conservative Group on 16 January 1973.

In the ensuing years, the group collected additional centre-right members, and on 17 July 1979 it changed its name to the "European Democratic Group".

In March 2009 it was reported that the European Conservatives could be re-created as a group in the European Parliament, led by the British Conservative Party if they withdraw from the European People's Party–European Democrats (EPP-ED) group and succeed in meeting the minimum requirements for a political group in the Parliament.

On 22 June 2009, the British Conservative Party with their colleagues launched the European Conservatives and Reformists (ECR) group.

== Members ==
Country	Name		Ideology
United Kingdom	Conservative Party	Conservatives	One-nation conservatism Liberal conservatism
Denmark	Conservative People's Party	DKF	Liberal conservatism Social conservatism
