= Eva-Britt Svensson =

Swedish politician

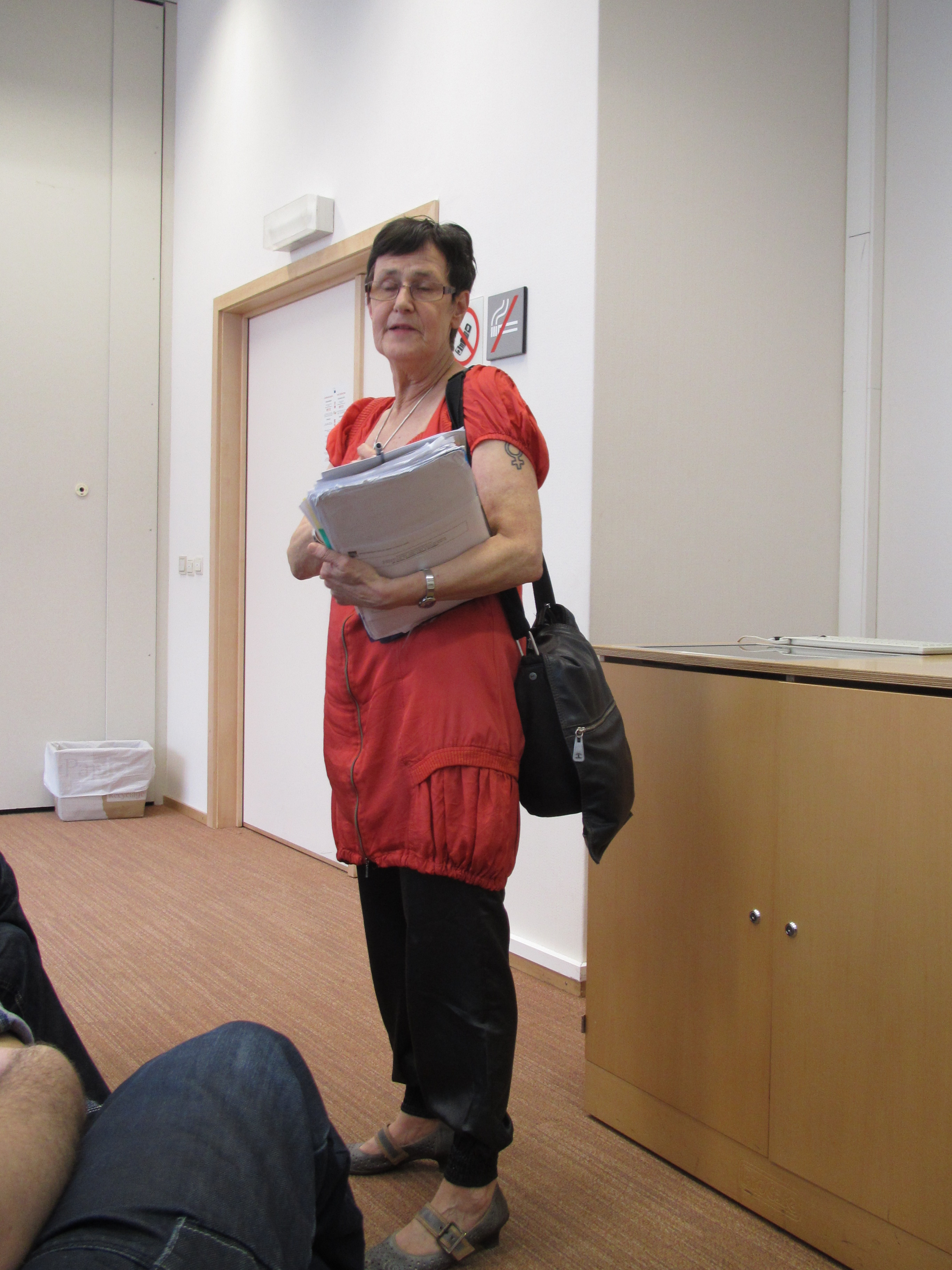
- Eva-Britt Svensson describing her work to visiting students of Kvarnby folkhögskola.

Member of the European Parliament for Sweden
- In office 2004–2011
- Succeeded by: Mikael Gustafsson

Personal details
- Born: 5 December 1946 (age 79) Värnamo, Sweden
- Party: Left Party

Eva-Britt Svensson (born 5 December 1946 in Värnamo) is a Swedish politician and former Member of the European Parliament. She is a member of the Left Party.Svensson has been vice-chair of the GUE/NGL group, and chair of the European Parliament's Committee on Women's Rights and Gender Equality. She was also a member of the Committee on the Internal Market and Consumer Protection, a substitute for the Committee on Employment and Social Affairs, a member of the delegation for relations with Israel, and a substitute for the delegation to the EU–Ukraine Parliamentary Cooperation Committee.

Svensson is known for opposing Europe-wide restrictions on freedom of speech and to prevent perceived gender stereotyping.

She left the Parliament in September 2011.

== Career ==
Career is as follows:

- Political secretary of the Left Party (Vänsterpartiet) (1995–2004)
- Member of County Council for the Left Party (1995–2004)
- Member of the Left Party's Executive (since 2000)
- Member of executive committee
- Tenants' association Sweden (since 2000)
- Chair of the People's Movement No to the EU, Sweden (1992–2001)
- Vice-chair of the People's Movement No to the EU, Sweden (since 2001)
