= European Conservatives and Reformists Group =

Right-wing political group of the European Parliament

- European Parliament group
- English abbr.: ECR Group; ECR
- French abbr.: CRE
- Ideology: National conservatism; Soft Euroscepticism; Atlanticism; Right-wing populism
- Political position: Right-wing to far-right
- European parties: European Conservatives and Reformists Party; European Free Alliance (N-VA); European Christian Political Party (SGP, PNCR)
- Associated organisations: New Direction
- From: 22 June 2009
- Preceded by: Movement for European Reform
- Chaired by: Nicola Procaccini; Patryk Jaki
- MEP(s): 84 / 720 (12%)
- Website: ecrgroup.eu

The European Conservatives and Reformists Group (ECR Group or simply ECR) is a national conservative, soft eurosceptic, and anti-federalist political group of the European Parliament. The ECR is the parliamentary group of the European Conservatives and Reformists Party (ECR Party) European political party, but also includes MEPs from other European parties and MEPs without European party affiliation.

Ideologically, the group is broadly eurosceptic, anti-federalist, and right-wing, with far-right factions. The stated objective of the ECR is to oppose unchecked European integration, enlargement and potential evolution of the European Union (EU) into a federal European superstate on the basis of eurorealism, and to ensure the EU does not heavily encroach on matters of state and domestic and regional decision making within EU member countries. It also advocates for stricter controls on immigration. The ECR contains factions of socially conservative, right-wing populist, liberal conservative, Christian democratic, far-right, and national conservative parties who all subscribe to an anti-federalist and a eurorealist or euro-critical stance.

The ECR promotes soft euroscepticism, as opposed to a total rejection of the existence of the EU characterised by anti-EU-ism or hard euroscepticism, by calling for democratic reform of the EU, more transparency, changes to the Eurozone and EU migration/asylum policies, and the curbing some of the EU's powers and bureaucracy whilst maintaining unrestricted free trade and cooperation between nations. Other parties and individual MEPs within the group support complete withdrawal from the block, referendums on EU membership and opposition to the Eurozone.

The ECR was founded around the Movement for European Reform following the 2009 European Parliament elections in the United Kingdom at the behest of the British Conservative Party leader David Cameron. During the tenth European Parliament, the largest party in the group by number of MEPs is Brothers of Italy (FdI), followed by Polish Law and Justice (PiS).

== History ==
=== Origins (2005–2006) ===
In 2005, the British Conservative Party held a leadership contest. During the sixth term of the European Parliament, Conservative Party MEPs sat in the European Democrats (ED), a subgroup of the European People's Party–European Democrats (EPP-ED) group, which is dominated by the European People's Party (EPP). Leadership contender David Cameron argued for withdrawal of the Conservatives from EPP-ED and the formation of a new group. Upon taking office as Conservative leader in December 2005, Cameron indicated that the launch of a new group would be undertaken immediately. The motives for forming this group was the EPP-ED was too federalist, while the Conservatives opposed stronger European integration. In June 2006, Cameron ordered Shadow Foreign Secretary William Hague to ensure the new group was created by 13 July 2006. When that date arrived, it was announced that the launch of the new European Parliament group was delayed until after the 2009 elections.

=== Movement for European Reform ===
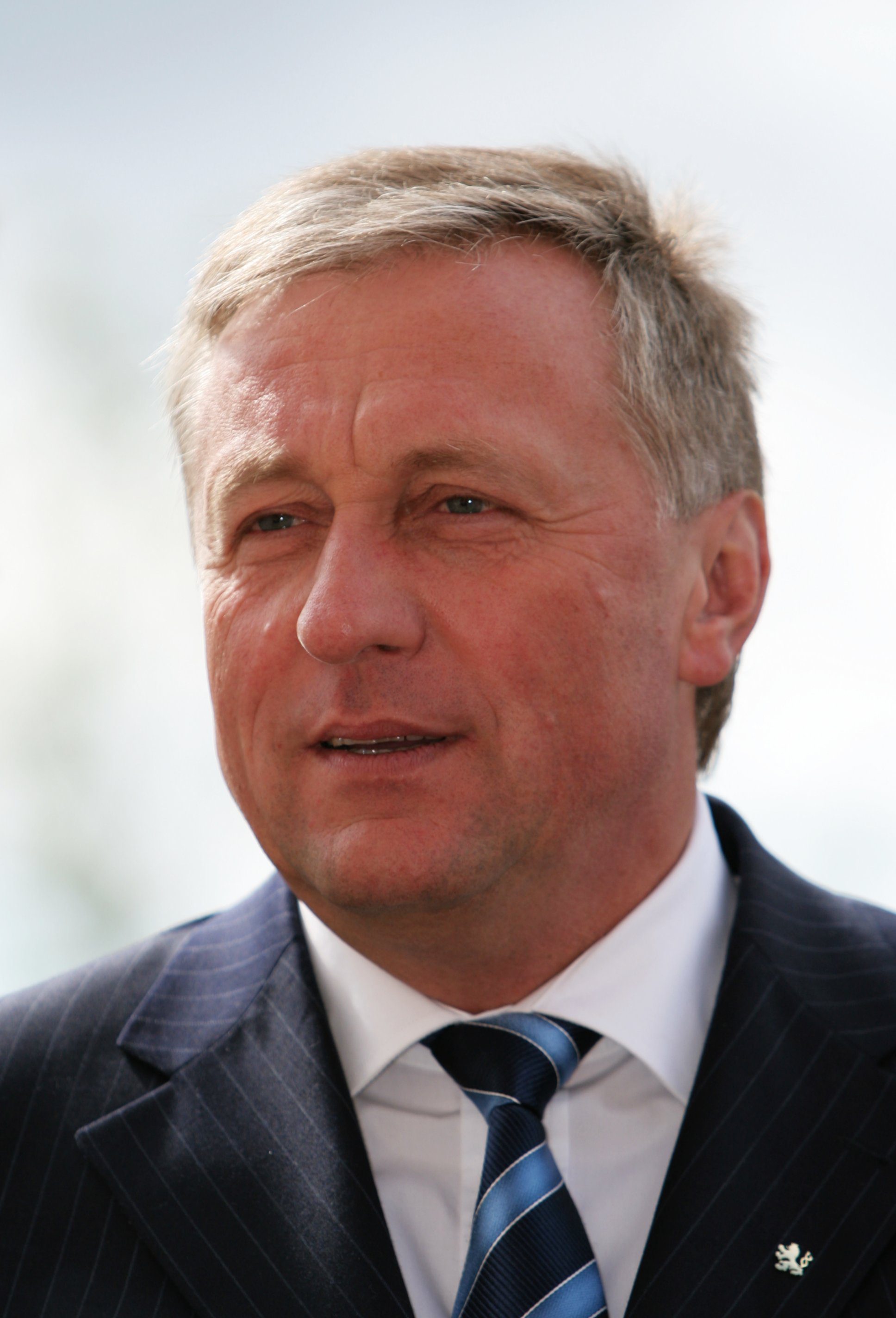
Mirek Topolánek

In the interim, a pan-European alliance, called the Movement for European Reform (MER), was founded and functioned outside of the European Parliament. The same day, the Law and Justice and Civic Platform parties of Poland were identified as potential members of the new group: However, Civic Platform stated that it would not leave the EPP, and the Law and Justice stated that it planned to stay aligned to UEN. The next day, Sir Reg Empey, the leader of the Ulster Unionist Party (UUP), suggested that the UUP could join the new group after the 2009 election.

In the event of the election, the UUP ran under the banner of the Ulster Conservatives and Unionists, an electoral alliance between the Conservative Party and the Ulster Unionists. The Czech Civic Democratic Party (ODS) was part of MER but its leader, Mirek Topolánek, did not rule out staying in EPP-ED. Topolánek then attended the EPP Summit (a meeting of heads of state and government of the European People's Party) of 21 June 2007, adding speculation about the fragility of the new group. Later in 2007, the relations between the EPP and the Conservative Party further deteriorated when the EPP voiced its opposition to the UK holding a referendum of the Treaty of Lisbon, something the Conservatives had campaigned for. In July 2008, the European Parliament raised the 2009 threshold for forming a group to 25 members and representing 7 member states. Topolánek, after being re-elected Leader of the ODS on 7 December 2008, attended yet another EPP Summit, on 11 December 2008.

=== 2009 European Parliament elections ===
As the 2009 European elections approached, Cameron, Topolánek, and Conservative MEP Geoffrey Van Orden, who was a "point-man" for the new group, were looking for partners. The list of possible partners was kept secret. People or parties that were rumoured to be possible partners in the new group included Law and Justice; Lega Nord; the Danish People's Party; For Fatherland and Freedom, Order and Justice, the Pensioners' Party; Order, Law and Justice; Libertas; Civic Union; Electoral Action of Poles in Lithuania, ChristianUnion-SGP; the independent Indrek Tarand; and Lijst Dedecker's Derk Jan Eppink; from member states such as the Czech Republic, Poland, Italy, Sweden, the Baltic and Balkan states, Belgium, and the Netherlands.

Speculation considered the remnants of the Union for Europe of the Nations (UEN) group, which was thought to be on the verge of collapse after the decision of Fianna Fáil to join the Alliance of Liberals and Democrats for Europe (ALDE), and the Italian National Alliance merging with EPP member party Forza Italia. Lajos Bokros, elected on the list of the Hungarian Democratic Forum (MDF) joined the group as the EPP did not want to accept him on pressure of the rival Fidesz. The new group was provisionally named the European Conservatives, (echoing the 1970s group of the same name), which was then changed to European Conservatives and Reformists. The original estimates were firmed up to 84 MEPs, then to approximately 60. Frictions surfaced, as the ODS wanted the new group to have as many MEPs as possible, whilst the Conservatives wanted to disbar anti-immigrant parties in the new group, including the Danish People's Party and Lega Nord.

=== Formation ===
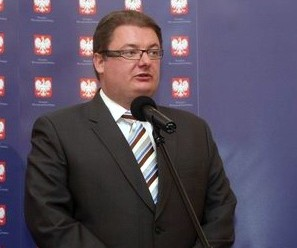
Former ECR chairman Michał Kamiński

On 22 June 2009, the first official list of the new group's members was released. On 24 June, the group held its inaugural meeting, in which Conservative MEP Timothy Kirkhope was named interim leader. Adam Bielan of PiS and Jan Zahradil of the ODS were named interim vice-chairmen. At the first sitting of the Seventh European Parliament, on 14 July 2009, outgoing Parliament President Hans-Gert Pöttering announced that applications from all new and returning groups had been received and approved, including ECR. The group then became eligible for EU funding, office space, and committee places. The first election for the group leadership was also scheduled for 14 July 2009, pitting interim leader Kirkhope against fellow Briton Geoffrey Van Orden.

Both Conservative leadership candidates were forced to forfeit the leadership to prevent it from falling apart, when Conservative MEP Edward McMillan-Scott defied his party whip and stood for one of the vice-presidency posts despite pledges the previous week that Polish MEP Michał Kamiński would be backed for it. Kamiński's bid for Vice-President of the European Parliament subsequently failed, and the Polish MEPs threatened to abandon the new caucus unless Kamiński was made the group leader in the parliament. Kirkhope went to an emergency meeting with Polish MEPs in Strasbourg and proposed sharing the group leadership with the Kamiński; however, this was not accepted, and he had to step down as coalition leader, withdrawing in favour of Kamiński. McMillan-Scott, who alleged that the Conservative's new allies in Poland are "racist and homophobic", had the Conservative whip withdrawn in the European Parliament. In March 2010, McMillan-Scott joined the British Liberal Democrats and the ALDE group.

=== Leadership and membership changes (2009–2014) ===
Group chairman Kamiński left Law and Justice (PiS) in November 2010, saying that the party had been taken over by the far-right. Kamiński and other Law and Justice MPs and MEPs formed a new Polish party, Poland Comes First, formed as a breakaway from Law and Justice following dissatisfaction with the direction and leadership of Jarosław Kaczyński. Kamiński initially remained chairman of the group, but other Law and Justice MEPs argued he should step down. On 15 December, rumours emerged that the eleven remaining PiS MEPs might leave the ECR and join the right-wing Europe of Freedom and Democracy (EFD) group instead. In February 2011, Kamiński announced he would resign his chairmanship, effective 8 March, when a replacement would be elected. Former interim leader Timothy Kirkhope was said to be the front runner, but lost the election to Jan Zahradil of the Czech Republic's ODS. In late March, David Cameron invited the New Flemish Alliance (N-VA) to join the group.

The May 2011 resignation of Silvana Koch-Mehrin, one of the fourteen Vice-Presidents of the European Parliament, led to the ECR considering putting another candidate forward to take the position they were denied through McMillan-Scott's defection. Conservative Party MEP Giles Chichester was nominated on 31 May, and was elected unopposed by the Parliament on 5 July 2011, after the ALDE group to which Koch-Mehrin belongs failed to find a willing and suitable candidate. On 14 December 2011, a new leadership was elected, with Martin Callanan as chairman and Jan Zahradil, Geoffrey Van Orden, Ryszard Legutko, and Derk Jan Eppink as Vice-Chairmen. On 26 December 2011, four members of United Poland – who had split from Law and Justice in November – left the ECR to join the Europe of Freedom and Democracy (EFD) group. On 17 January 2012, Czech Oldřich Vlasák replaced Chichester as the ECR's Vice-President of the Parliament.

=== 2014 European Parliament elections ===
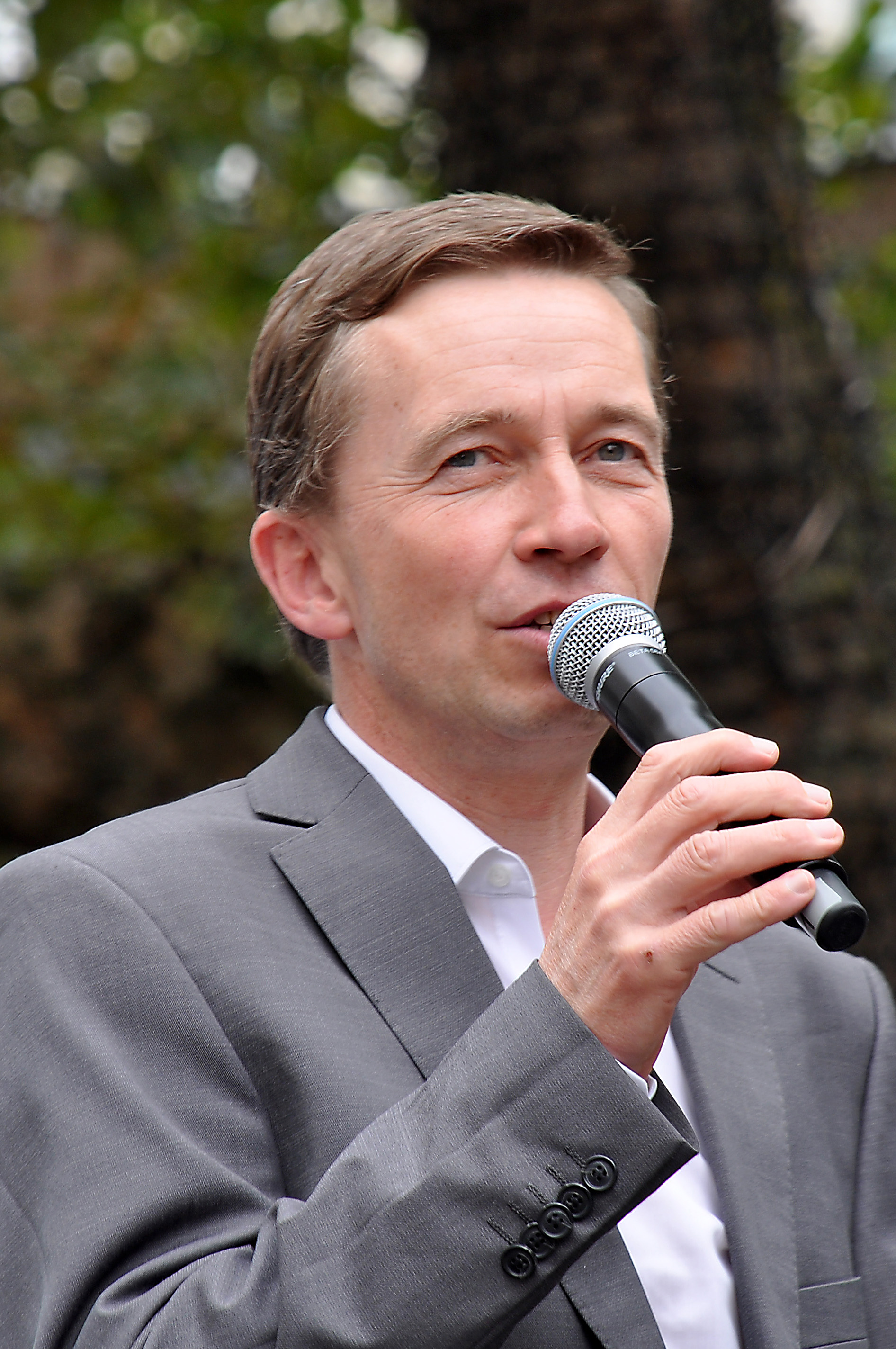
Bernd Lucke, former leader of Alternative for Germany

The 2014 European elections were held on 22–25 May 2014. In the weeks following the election, several parties joined the ECR, including the Danish People's Party and the Finns Party (both of which switched from the EFD group), Alternative for Germany, the Family Party of Germany, Ordinary People and Independent Personalities (OĽaNO) and New Majority (NOVA) from Slovakia, the Independent Greeks, Bulgaria Without Censorship, the Dutch Reformed Political Party, and the Belgian New Flemish Alliance (N-VA) (previously attached to the Greens/EFA group). As a result of these additions, the ECR overtook ALDE to become the third biggest group in the European parliament, assuming the role of "kingmakers" in the new Parliament.

On 23 June, Irish Fianna Fáil MEP Brian Crowley joined from the ALDE group, but without the permission of his party or its leader Micheál Martin, who removed Crowley's party whip the following day. On the same day, IMRO – Bulgarian National Movement joined, taking the group to 70 MEPs. The ECR's unanimous decision to admit the Danish People's Party and Finns Party as members was criticised because one MEP from each party has a criminal conviction. Morten Messerschmidt, lead candidate for the Danish People's Party, was convicted in 2002 for publishing material that appeared to suggest that there is a link between a multiethnic society and rape, violence and forced marriages. Jussi Halla-aho, a Finns Party MEP, was convicted in 2012 after writing a 2008 blog entry which claimed that Islam "reveres paedophilia". Syed Kamall, the ECR's chairman, who is a practising Muslim, defended the new members.

Following the election, British Conservative MEP Sajjad Karim was the group's candidate for President of the European Parliament. On 8 March 2016, the bureau of the ECR Group began motions to exclude the two remaining MEPs of the Alternative for Germany (AfD) from their group due to the AfD's links with the far-right Freedom Party of Austria (FPÖ) and controversial remarks about immigration, inviting the MEPs to voluntarily leave the group by 31 March, with a motion of exclusion to be tabled on 12 April otherwise.

=== Changes in membership 2014–2019 ===
On 2 October 2014, the leader of the Slovak party Freedom and Solidarity (SaS), Richard Sulík, left the ALDE group to join the ECR, and was formally accepted six days later. In November 2014, the sole Croatian member of the group, Ruža Tomašić, left the party she founded, Croatian Party of Rights dr. Ante Starčević, to lead a new party, the Croatian Conservative Party. On 24 January 2015, Amjad Bashir, the UKIP MEP for Yorkshire and the Humber, changed affiliation to the Conservative Party and subsequently joined the ECR.

On 18 May 2015, Raffaele Fitto, formerly of Italian party Forza Italia and EPP group member, joined the ECR group: forming a party called the Conservatives and Reformists after the ECR. On 7 July 2015, Remo Sernagiotto left the EPP to join the ECR. On 27 October 2015, Monica Macovei, from M10 political party left the EPP to join the ECR. On 8 March 2016, Eleni Theocharous of the Cypriot Democratic Rally was admitted to the group from the EPP.

On 5 October 2016, Timothy Kirkhope was forced to quit after being created a life peer in the UK House of Lords, and thus becoming ineligible to continue serving in the European Parliament. His seat was succeeded by John Procter. On 3 July 2018, Peter Lundgren and Kristina Winberg, from Sweden Democrats left EFDD group to join ECR group. On 17 December 2018, Stefano Maullu left the EPP group to join the ECR group after his defection from Forza Italia to the Brothers of Italy.

=== 2019 European Parliament elections and shift to the right ===
Prior to the 2019 elections, the Sweden Democrats (SD) and Brothers of Italy joined the ECR group, while Forum for Democracy (FvD) and Debout la France pledged to do so after the elections should they win seats. Two ECR member parties, the Danish People's Party and the Finns Party, announced their intention to form a new group called the European Alliance for People and Nations with Alternative for Germany and Italy's League following the 2019 elections which was subsequently named Identity and Democracy.

During the 2019 elections, the British Conservative Party sustained losses, including that of former ECR chairman Syed Kamall. The ECR also saw its total number of MEPs reduced to 62 MEPs and was overtaken in number by Identity and Democracy, the other predominant eurosceptic grouping; however, the FvD and the new Spanish Vox party gained seats for the first time and were formally admitted into the group. Following the election, the group named Raffaele Fitto and Ryszard Legutko as new joint chairmen.

=== Membership changes (2019–2024) ===
The Dutch Christian Union (CU) quit the group following the 2019 elections and switched to the European People's Party Group with the CU's sole MEP Peter van Dalen protesting that the ECR was moving too far to the right with the inclusion of parties like Forum for Democracy, Vox and the Sweden Democrats. The fellow Dutch Reformed Political Party opted to remain in the group, signalling the end of an alliance the CU and Reformed party had during European elections. On 31 January 2020, the remaining British Conservative Party MEPs resigned from the group following the completion of the withdrawal of the United Kingdom from the European Union.

In May 2020, Cristian Terheș announced he was joining the ECR group as an MEP for the Romanian Christian Democratic National Peasants' Party (which had previously been expelled from the European People's Party Group) having initially been elected for the Social Democratic Party. In 2020, all MEPs of the Forum for Democracy party resigned to sit as independents before co-founding a new party, JA21. In 2022, Forum for Democracy switched its affiliation to the Identity and Democracy group. In 2023, the Finns Party switched back its affiliation from the Identity and Democracy group to the ECR group citing the Russian invasion of Ukraine and their change in policy regarding NATO membership.

=== 2024 European Parliament elections ===
For the 2024 European Parliament election the ECR campaigned for revisions to the European Green New Deal and for stronger border control measures. The group increased its number of MEPs to 84 and became the third largest group in the European Parliament, overtaking Renew Europe. After the election, the Alternative Democratic Reform Party of Luxembourg, the Cypriot National People's Front, the Homeland Movement, the Alliance for the Union of Romanians and the Romanian National Conservative Party were formally admitted into the group along with Reconquête (which had stood on a joint ticket with the Mouvement Conservateur) and the Denmark Democrats.

In June 2024, four out of the five newly elected Reconquête MEPs were expelled or resigned to sit as independents within the group after lead candidate Marion Marechal called on members of the party to support the National Rally during the French legislative election. Reconquête's sole remaining MEP Sarah Knafo joined the new Europe of Sovereign Nations group instead while the former members stayed with the ECR. Prior to the election, there was media speculation that Hungary's Viktor Orbán and his Fidesz party would join the group after talks with Brothers of Italy leader Giorgia Meloni, however after the election it was alleged Fidesz was blocked from joining the ECR while other press outlets claimed that Fidesz chose not to join due to previous disagreements with the Alliance for the Union of Romanians. After this Orbán formed the Patriots for Europe group. On 3 July 2024 the group elected Nicola Procaccini (FdI) and Joachim Brudziński (PiS) as co-chair, with 4 vice-chairs and 2 co-treasurers.

Also on 3 July 2024, Jaak Madison, an independent Estonian MEP who formerly was a member of the Conservative People's Party of Estonia, joined the ECR Group. On 22 August, Madison joined the Estonian Centre Party. Although the Estonian Centre Party is currently part of the Renew Europe group, Madison will remain a member of the ECR Group, and the Centre Party's leader, Mihhail Kõlvart, stated that the party is considering leaving Renew Europe. On 5 July, the Spanish Vox, with 6 MEPs, announced its intention to leave the ECR to join the new Patriots for Europe group. In a statement on Twitter, Vox leader Santiago Abascal expressed gratitude to the ECR group and said his party would continue to maintain strong relations with Meloni, but argued the move was a "historic opportunity to fight against a coalition of centre-right, socialist and far-left forces."

Following Vox's departure, Se Acabó La Fiesta (SALF), with 3 MEPs, announced it would seek to join the ECR after SALF leader Alvise Pérez suddenly withdrew from negotiations with Alternative for Germany about joining their proposed Europe of Sovereign Nations group. The ECR stated it would make a decision in September on whether to admit SALF though it ultimately declined SALF's request. The ECR subsequently changed its position in December 2024 and agreed to admit two SALF MEPs Diego Solier Fernández and Nora Junco García as members while Pérez remained as a Non-Inscrits.

On 29 July 2024, the Sweden Democrats, Denmark Democrats and Finns Party formed the 'Nordic Freedom' alliance within the ECR, due to shared positions on Russia, immigration and EU regulations. On 31 August 2024, Homeland Movement MEP Stephen Nikola Bartulica left the party, making him an independent member of the ECR. In May 2025, the two SALF MEPs announced they had resigned from their party to sit as independent MEPs within the ECR citing disputes and legal controversies surrounding SALF leader Alvise Pérez. In June 2025, Following the expulsion of Luxembourgish Alternative Democratic Reform Party (ADR) MEP Fernand Kartheiser from the ECR for visiting Russia, the Patriots for Europe group approached the ADR for talks. The ADR stated that while it was considering what group the party wanted to belong to if the whole party were fully expelled from the ECR, it was not yet actively discussing membership with any other political group.

In March 2026 two MEPs from the Dutch Farmer–Citizen Movement defected from European People's Party to ECR. In June 2026 Czech MEP Nikola Bartůšek joined ECR after leaving Patriots earlier the same year.

== Ideology ==
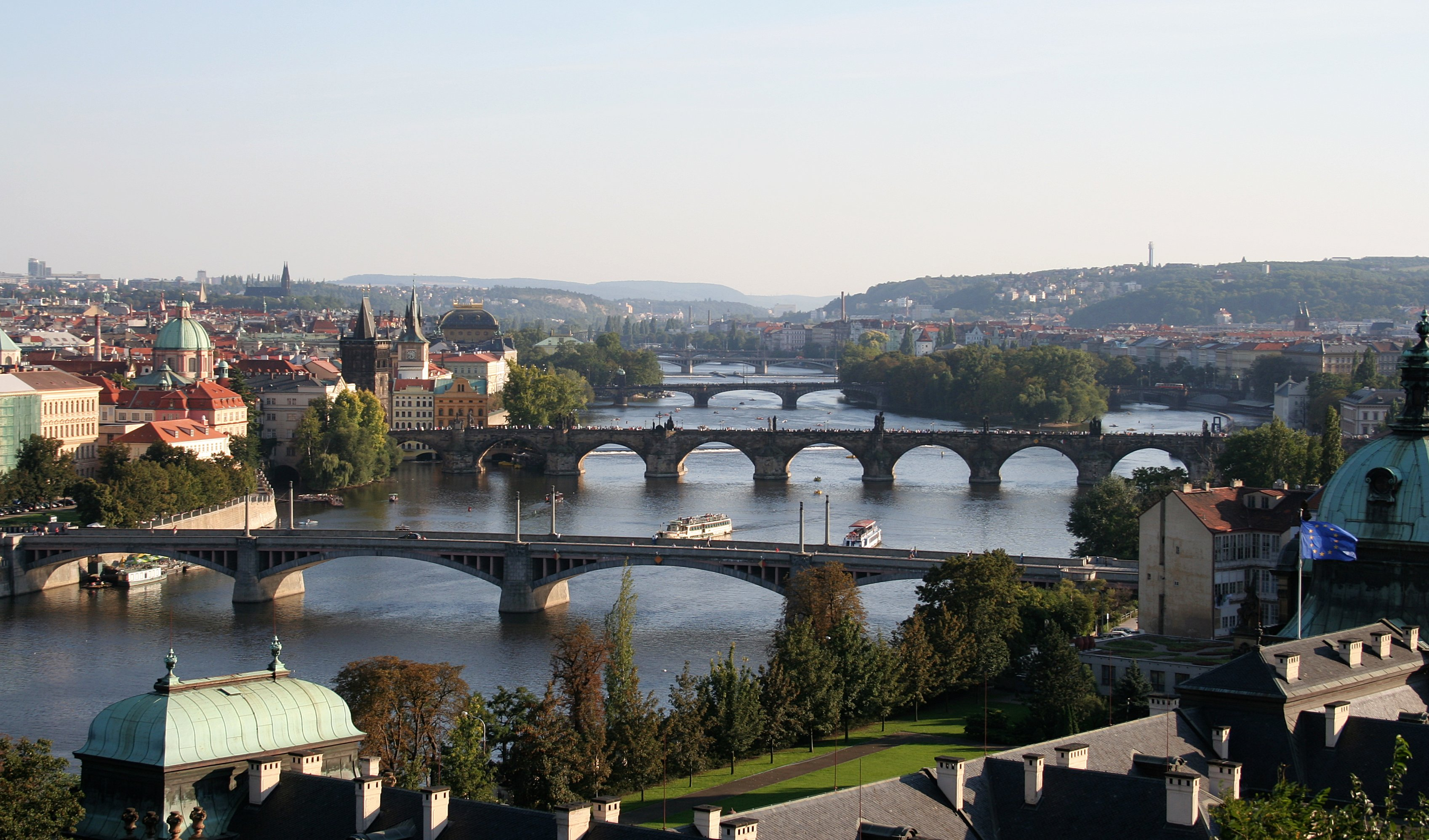
The Prague Declaration was first proposed in 2003.

The constituent declaration of the ECR stating the principles to which each group member is expected to adhere is known as the Prague Declaration. The Prague Declaration outlines the following principles:

1. Free enterprise, free and fair trade and competition, minimal regulation, lower taxation, and small government as the ultimate catalysts for individual freedom and personal and national prosperity.
2. Freedom of the individual, more personal responsibility and greater democratic accountability.
3. Sustainable, clean energy supply with an emphasis on energy security.
4. The importance of the family as the bedrock of society.
5. The sovereign integrity of the nation state, opposition to EU federalism and a renewed respect for true subsidiarity.
6. The over-riding value of the transatlantic security relationship in a revitalised NATO, and support for young democracies across Europe.
7. Effectively controlled immigration and an end to abuse of asylum procedures
8. Efficient and modern public services and sensitivity to the needs of both rural and urban communities.
9. An end to waste and excessive bureaucracy and a commitment to greater transparency and probity in the EU institutions and use of EU funds.
10. Respect and equitable treatment for all EU countries, new and old, large and small.

Ideologically, the founder members of the ECR traditionally sat on the centre-right to right-wing of the political spectrum with an economically liberal and anti-federalist outlook and an initial reluctance from the Conservative Party to include hardline anti-immigration and ultra-nationalist parties. Like the centre-right European People's Party (EPP), the founding members of the ECR mostly support pro-free market ideas with some of its MEPs maintaining ties to think-tanks such as The Cobden Centre and Open Europe, as opposed to the more economic nationalist and anti-globalisation approach of other euro-critical groups such as the EFDD and Identity and Democracy; the EPP generally favours EU integration and enlargement whereas the ECR opposes it. By the late 2010s, the group came to contain a growing faction of nationalist, anti-immigration, and right-wing populist movements. This shift to the right was increased following the withdrawal of the United Kingdom from the European Union, since the Conservative Party lost its representation in the European Parliament. In a statement issued on 11 November 2021, two core political documents were cited by the Group's Co-Chairmen, Ryszard Legutko and Raffaele Fitto, to define the ECR's ideological basis when they reaffirmed the Group's "commitment to the Prague Declaration and the ECR Statement on the Reform of the European Union".

During the Russian invasion of Ukraine, the group has come to comprise generally pro-Ukrainian and anti-Russian parties, whereas Identity and Democracy mainly consists of pro-Russian parties. In February 2023, the group's chairman Legutko stated that the group shall stand by Ukraine until Russia is defeated and beyond. Following the 2023 Finnish parliamentary election, the Finns Party, having previously moved to ID, rejoined ECR citing their change in policy to endorse Finnish NATO membership as the reason for the move. Members of the ECR tend to be pro-NATO and support Atlanticism, including more coordination between Europe and the United States, while taking a more critical view on the influence of China and Russia in Europe.

== MEPs ==
=== 10th European Parliament ===
European Conservatives and Reformists MEPs (2024–2029) has MEPs in 18 member states. Dark blue indicates member states sending multiple MEPs, light blue indicates member states sending a single MEP.

State	National party	European alliance	MEPs
Belgium	New Flemish Alliance; Nieuw-Vlaamse Alliantie (N-VA)	EFA	3 / 22
Bulgaria	Movement for Rights and Freedoms; Движение за права и свободи (DPS)	ECR	2 / 17
Bulgaria	There is Such a People; Има такъв народ (ITN)	ECR	1 / 17
Croatia	Home and National Rally; Dom i nacionalno okupljanje (DOMiNO)	ECR	1 / 12
Cyprus	National People's Front; Εθνικό Λαϊκό Μέτωπο (ELAM)	ECR	1 / 6
Czech Republic	Civic Democratic Party; Občanská demokratická strana (ODS)	ECR	3 / 21
Czech Republic	Independent; Nikola Bartůšek	None	1 / 21
Denmark	Denmark Democrats; Danmarksdemokraterne (Æ)	ECR	1 / 15
Estonia	Estonian Centre Party (Note: Only Jaak Madison. The party's other MEP sits with Renew Europe); Eesti Keskerakond (KE)	None	1 / 7
Finland	Finns Party; Perussuomalaiset (PS)	ECR	1 / 15
France	Identity–Liberties; Identité-Libertés (IDL)	ECR	4 / 81
Greece	Greek Solution; Ελληνική Λύση (ΕΛ)	None	2 / 21
Italy	Brothers of Italy; Fratelli d'Italia (FdI)	ECR	24 / 76
Latvia	National Alliance; Nacionālā Apvienība (NA)	ECR	2 / 9
Latvia	United List; Apvienotais saraksts (AS)	None	1 / 9
Lithuania	Electoral Action of Poles in Lithuania – Christian Families Alliance; Lietuvos lenkų rinkimų akcija – Krikščioniškų šeimų sąjunga (LLRA–KŠS); Akcja Wyborcza Polaków na Litwie – Związek Chrześcijańskich Rodzin (AWPL–ZCHR)	ECR	1 / 11
Lithuania	Lithuanian Farmers and Greens Union; Lietuvos valstiečių ir žaliųjų sąjunga (LVŽS)	ECR	1 / 11
Netherlands	Farmer–Citizen Movement; BoerBurgerBeweging (BBB)	None	2 / 31
Netherlands	Reformed Political Party; Staatkundig Gereformeerde Partij (SGP)	ECPP	1 / 31
Poland	Law and Justice; Prawo i Sprawiedliwość (PiS)	ECR	20 / 53
Romania	Alliance for the Union of Romanians; Alianța pentru Unirea Românilor (AUR)	ECR	3 / 33
Romania	Conservative Action; Acțiunea Conservatoare (ACT)	None	2 / 33
Romania	Romanian National Conservative Party; Partidul Național Conservator Român (PNCR)	ECPP	1 / 33
Spain	Independent; Diego Solier (Note: Entered the group as a member of SALF but left the party in 2025.)	None	1 / 61
Spain	Independent; Nora Junco (Note: Entered the group as a member of SALF but left the party in 2025.)	None	1 / 61
Sweden	Sweden Democrats; Sverigedemokraterna (SD)	ECR	3 / 21
European Union	Total		84 / 720

=== 9th European Parliament ===
European Conservatives and Reformists MEPs (2019–2024) has MEPs in 15 member states. Dark blue indicates member states sending multiple MEPs, light blue indicates member states sending a single MEP.

State	National party	European alliance	MEPs
Belgium	New Flemish Alliance; Nieuw-Vlaamse Alliantie (N-VA)	EFA	3 / 21
Bulgaria	IMRO – Bulgarian National Movement; ВМРО – Българско Национално Движение (ВМРО – БНД)	ECR	2 / 17
Croatia	Croatian Sovereignists; Hrvatski Suverenisti (HS)	ECR	1 / 12
Czech Republic	Civic Democratic Party; Občanská demokratická strana (ODS)	ECR	4 / 21
Finland	Finns Party; Perussuomalaiset (PS)	None	2 / 14
France	Reconquest; Reconquête! (R!)	None	1 / 79
Germany	Alliance Germany; Bündnis Deutschland (BD)	None	1 / 96
Greece	Greek Solution; Ελληνική Λύση (ΕΛ)	None	1 / 21
Italy	Brothers of Italy; Fratelli d'Italia (FdI)	ECR	10 / 76
Latvia	National Alliance; Nacionālā Apvienība (NA)	ECR	2 / 8
Lithuania	Electoral Action of Poles in Lithuania – Christian Families Alliance; Lietuvos lenkų rinkimų akcija – Krikščioniškų šeimų sąjunga (LLRA–KŠS); Akcja Wyborcza Polaków na Litwie – Związek Chrześcijańskich Rodzin (AWPL–ZCHR)	ECR	1 / 11
Netherlands	JA21; JA21	None	3 / 29
Netherlands	Reformed Political Party; Staatkundig Gereformeerde Partij (SGP)	ECPM	1 / 29
Netherlands	More Direct Democracy; Meer Directe Democratie (MDD)	None	1 / 29
Poland	Law and Justice; Prawo i Sprawiedliwość (PiS)	ECR	25 / 52
Poland	Sovereign Poland; Suwerenna Polska (SP)	None	2 / 52
Romania	Christian Democratic National Peasants' Party; Partidul Național Țărănesc Creștin Democrat (PNȚ-CD)	ECPM	1 / 33
Slovakia	Freedom and Solidarity; Sloboda a Solidarita (SaS)	ECR	1 / 14
Spain	Vox; Vox	ECR	4 / 59
Sweden	Sweden Democrats; Sverigedemokraterna (SD)	ECR	3 / 21
European Union	Total		69 / 705

=== 8th European Parliament ===
Country	National party	European alliance	MEPs	Date joined
Belgium	New Flemish Alliance; Nieuw-Vlaamse Alliantie (N-VA)	EFA	4 / 21	18 June 2014
Bulgaria	Bulgarian National Movement; ВМРО – Българско Национално Движение (IMRO-BNM)	None	1 / 17	24 June 2014
Bulgaria	Reload Bulgaria; Презареди България (BG)	ACRE	1 / 17	12 June 2014
Croatia	Croatian Conservative Party; Hrvatska konzervativna stranka (HKS)	ACRE	1 / 12	1 July 2013
Cyprus	Solidarity Movement; Κίνημα Αλληλεγγύη (KA)	ACRE	1 / 6	8 March 2016
Czech Republic	Civic Democratic Party; Občanská demokratická strana (ODS)	ACRE	2 / 21	22 June 2009
Denmark	Danish People's Party; Dansk Folkeparti (DF)	EAPN	3 / 13	4 June 2014
Finland	Finns Party; Perussuomalaiset (PS)	EAPN	2 / 13	4 June 2014
Germany	Liberal Conservative Reformers (Note: Bernd Lucke left AfD with 4 more MEPs after losing leadership of his party in 2015. The remaining two AfD members, Beatrix von Storch and Marcus Pretzell were expelled from the ECR group in 2016.); Liberal-Konservative Reformer (LKR)	ACRE	4 / 96	12 June 2014
Germany	Alliance C Bündnis C (AUF & PBC)	ECPM	1 / 96	4 June 2014
Germany	Independent (Note: Left LKR.)	Independent	1 / 96	29 September 2018
Greece	Independent (Note: Notis Marias left ANEL.)	Independent	1 / 21	4 June 2014
Italy	Brothers of Italy; Fratelli d'Italia (FdI)	ACRE	2 / 73	17 December 2018
Italy	Direction Italy; Direzione Italia (DI)	ACRE	2 / 73	19 May 2015
Latvia	National Alliance; Nacionālā Apvienība (NA)	ACRE	1 / 8	22 June 2009
Lithuania	Electoral Action of Poles in Lithuania (Note: Full name: Electoral Action of Poles in Lithuania – Christian Families Alliance); Lietuvos lenkų rinkimų akcija (LLRA–KŠS)	ACRE	1 / 11	23 June 2009
Netherlands	Christian Union; ChristenUnie (CU)	ECPM	1 / 26	22 June 2009
Netherlands	Reformed Political Party; Staatkundig Gereformeerde Partij (SGP)	ECPM	1 / 26	16 June 2014
Poland	Law and Justice; Prawo i Sprawiedliwość (PiS)	ACRE	14 / 51	22 June 2009
Poland	Right Wing of the Republic; Prawica Rzeczypospolitej (PR)	ECPM	1 / 51	1 July 2014
Poland	Independent (Note: They are: Jacek Saryusz-Wolski, Mirosław Piotrowski, Urszula Krupa, Zdzisław Krasnodębski)	Independent	4 / 51	1 July 2014
Romania	M^{10}	ACRE	1 / 32	27 October 2015
Slovakia	Freedom and Solidarity; Sloboda a Solidarita (SaS)	ACRE	1 / 13	8 October 2014
Slovakia	New Majority; NOVA	ACRE	1 / 13	4 June 2014
Slovakia	Ordinary People; Obyčajní Ľudia a nezávislé osobnosti (OĽaNO)	ECPM	1 / 13	4 June 2014
Sweden	Sweden Democrats; Sverigedemokraterna (SD)	None	2 / 20	3 July 2018
United Kingdom	Conservative Party; Conservative and Unionist Party (Con)	ACRE	8 / 73	22 June 2009
United Kingdom	Ulster Unionist Party (UUP)	ACRE	1 / 73	22 June 2009
European Union	Total			63 / 751

== Leadership ==
=== Chairperson ===
Chairperson	Took office	Left office	Country (Constituency)	Party
Timothy Kirkhope	24 June 2009	14 July 2009	United Kingdom (Yorkshire and the Humber)	Conservative
Michał Kamiński	14 July 2009	8 March 2011	Poland (Warsaw)	Law and Justice then Poland Comes First
Jan Zahradil	8 March 2011	14 December 2011	Czech Republic	Civic Democratic Party
Martin Callanan	14 December 2011	12 June 2014	United Kingdom (North East England)	Conservative
Syed Kamall	12 June 2014	2 July 2019	United Kingdom (London)	Conservative
Raffaele Fitto*	2 July 2019	12 October 2022	Italy (Southern)	Brothers of Italy
Ryszard Legutko*	2 July 2019	3 July 2024	Poland (Lesser Poland and Świętokrzyskie)	Law and Justice
Nicola Procaccini*	14 February; 2023	present	Italy (Southern)	Brothers of Italy
Joachim Brudziński*	3 July 2024	present	Poland (Lubusz and West Pomeranian)	Law and Justice

- Note: since 2019 The European Conservatives and Reformists group has had two co-chairpeople.

=== Group Bureau ===
As of 12 July 2024:

Position	Name	Party
Co-President	Joachim Brudziński	(Poland) Law and Justice
Co-President	Nicola Procaccini	Brothers of Italy
Vice-President	Assita Kanko	(Belgium) New Flemish Alliance
Vice-President	Charlie Weimers	(Sweden) Swedish Democrats
Vice-President	Alexandr Vondra	(Czech Republic) Civic Democratic Party
Co-Treasurer	Kosma Złotowski	(Poland) Law and Justice
Co-Treasurer	Denis Nesci	Brothers of Italy

== Cohesion ==
According to calculations by Vote Watch Europe, the ECR group had a cohesion rate of 86.65% in parliamentary votes during the 7th session (2009–14). This is slightly lower than in the four pro-European groups, but higher than in the European United Left–Nordic Green Left (GUE/NGL) and far higher than in the Europe of Freedom and Democracy (EFD) groups. Internal cohesion was highest in votes on constitutional and inter-institutional affairs (94.79%), international trade, and industry, research, and energy. The greatest divergence within the group was in decisions on regional development (70.53% cohesion), agriculture, and development (cooperation). The parties that were most loyal to the group (meaning that they voted with the majority of ECR members the most often) were the UK Conservatives (97.51%), the Ulster Unionist Party and the Czech Civic Democratic Party. The members who deviated from the ECR majority the most often were the individual MEPs Andreasen from the UK (who had switched over from EFD group only in 2013; 61.20% loyalty), Muscardini from Italy, and Rosbach (who had crossed over from EFD in 2011).

== See also ==
- Nordic Freedom
- European Conservatives, an earlier political group of Conservatives in the European Parliament
- European Conservatives and Reformists Group Executive
- Movement for European Reform
