= Movement for European Reform =

Former centre-right European political alliance

Movement for European Reform Bewegung für europäische Reform Mouvement pour la réforme européenne Movimento per la riforma europea Movimiento para la reforma europea
- President: None appointed
- Founded: 13 July 2006
- Dissolved: 1 October 2009
- Succeeded by: Alliance of European Conservatives and Reformists
- Headquarters: 25 Victoria Street, London SW1H 0DL
- Ideology: Conservatism; Economic liberalism Atlanticism; Soft Euroscepticism
- Political position: Centre-right
- European Parliament group: European Conservatives and Reformists Group
- International affiliation: None
- Colours: Dark blue

Website
- www.europeanreform.eu

The Movement for European Reform (MER) was a centre-right European political alliance with conservative, pro-free market and Eurosceptic inclinations. It consisted of the Conservative Party of the United Kingdom and the Civic Democratic Party of the Czech Republic.

Founded on 13 July 2006, MER was created as a precursor to the Alliance of European Conservatives and Reformists (AECR) and European Conservatives and Reformists (ECR), a political group in the European Parliament that was launched in June 2009 following European elections. Its operations folded into the ECR and the AECR later that year.

== History ==
MER was formed as an interim measure to function outside the European Parliament until a new group could be formed within it after the 2009 elections. Until then, its MEPs continued as members of the now-dissolved ED subgroup within the broader EPP-ED group.

Since its launch, it was unclear as to whether the MER would remain a simple pan-European alliance or apply for official recognition as a European political party. The body's founding statement expressly offered membership to parties from non-EU member states, a characteristic of other European political parties, and its commitment to fight the 2009 election together suggested an appetite for recognition.

After the 2009 European election, members of the MER initiated the European Conservatives and Reformists Group, a new political group in the European Parliament.

The MER website stopped being updated in 2007 and, in June 2009, the British Conservative Shadow Foreign Secretary William Hague said that the MER's aims and activities would be folded into the new European Parliamentary group.

== Ideology ==
MER's position was that the European Union should exist; however, it should be a looser supranational organisation than the current structure. This makes it more Eurosceptic than the three major European-level political movements (the European People's Party, Party of European Socialists and European Liberal Democrat and Reform Party), but less Eurosceptic than formations such as the Europe of Freedom and Democracy, the successor to the Independence and Democracy group in the European Parliament.

== Members ==
Members of MER were:

- United Kingdom - Conservative Party
- Czech Republic - Civic Democratic Party

In the first week of March 2007, under Petar Stoyanov, the Bulgarian Union of Democratic Forces (UDF) decided to join. A day after the UDF's announcement, the Presidency of the European People's Party (EPP) recommended that UDF be suspended from the EPP. The President of the EPP Wilfried Martens justified the suspension, arguing that:

...It is not compatible for a member party of the EPP to join such an initiative and at the same time remain in our party. The EPP is committed to reforming the European Union (EU) and we are open for constructive dialogue with our non-EPP allies but, at the same time, we expect UDF to be loyal and committed to its membership obligations...

In mid April 2007, the UDF backtracked and stated that it remained loyal to the EPP and that it would never leave the EPP section of the EPP-ED Group to join another Group. A month later, in the first-ever elections for the European Parliament in Bulgaria (20 May 2007) the UDF failed to elect any seats. As a result, Petar Stoyanov - who was accused by his critics of making poor decisions during the campaign, including the MER choice - resigned as UDF leader. In September 2007, the UDF formally withdrew from the MER and re-affirmed its membership with the EPP.
