= Alliance for Europe of the Nations =

Former conservative European political party

- President: Michał Kamiński
- Founded: 25 June 2002
- Dissolved: 2009
- Headquarters: 27 boulevard du Prince Henri, 1724 Luxembourg
- Ideology: National conservatism
- Political position: Right-wing
- European Parliament group: Union for Europe of the Nations
- International affiliation: None
- Colours: Blue, yellow

The Alliance for Europe of the Nations was a European political party that gathered conservative and national-conservative political parties from across the continent.

== History ==
The AEN was founded in 2002, designed to complement the existing Union for Europe of the Nations group in the European Parliament. Moves towards establishing standardised funding block grants for European political parties were at this point well afoot, and the parties affiliated with UEN required a corresponding organisation to take advantage of them.

Almost immediately upon its founding, the AEN began to decline in terms of membership and influence. At its first meeting, participants included the Czech Civic Democratic Party, Portuguese CDS-PP, Israeli Likud, Irish Fianna Fáil, Italian National Alliance and the Greek Popular Orthodox Rally, all of which later left the organisation.

The AEN had a broadly national-conservative political line, but many members were uncomfortable with this. There was a strong movement for the centrist Fianna Fáil to leave AEN and join the European Liberal Democrat and Reform Party, which it did on 17 April 2009. Also, National Alliance, which despite its post-fascist background was a moderate national-conservative party strongly promoting European integration, grew uncomfortable with AEN and left it for the European People's Party by merging with Forza Italia to form The People of Freedom party on 27 March 2009.

MEPs elected from its member-parties were expected to sit in the affiliated Union for Europe of the Nations (UEN) group in the European Parliament, but UEN collapsed in 2009 following the 2009 European Parliament elections, and MEPs from AEN member parties were scattered across the European Conservatives and Reformists and Europe of Freedom and Democracy groups, and their respective European-level parties, the Alliance of European Conservatives and Reformists and Movement for a Europe of Liberties and Democracy.

After those realignments, there were too few AEN member parties left to retain its EU-funded status as a European political party. The AEN's 2009 grant was rescinded.

== Funding ==
The grants from the European Parliament to AEN from 2004 to 2010 were as follows:

Financial year	Initial grant (EUR)	Final grant (EUR)
2004/5	161 250	83 964
2005/6	450 000	114 330
2006/7	450 000	144 809
2007/8	300 000	159 138
2008/9	300 000	206 375
2009/10	577 150	n/a

== Member parties ==
Current state(s)	Party	Joined	Left	New group / future
Albania	Republican Party of Albania	2002	2009	
Bulgaria	National Ideal for Unity	?	2006/7	
Cyprus	Fighting Democratic Movement	?	2009	Merged into DIKO
Czech Republic	Civic Democratic Party	2002	bef 2006	Alliance of European Conservatives and Reformists
Denmark	Danish People's Party	2002	2006/7	Movement for a Europe of Liberties and Democracy
Estonia	People's Union of Estonia	2002	2009	
France	Rally for France	2002	2009	
Greece	ESESY (Hellenic League)	2008/9	2009	
Greece	Popular Orthodox Rally	2002	2005	Movement for a Europe of Liberties and Democracy
Hungary	Hungarian Provincial and Civic Party	2004	2009	
Ireland	Fianna Fáil	2002	2009	Alliance of Liberals and Democrats for Europe Party
Israel	International Right Forum	2002	bef 2006	
Israel	Likud	2002	bef 2006	
Israel	Yisrael Beiteinu	2002	bef 2006	
Italy	National Alliance	2002	2009	Party merged into The People of Freedom
Italy	Sicilian Alliance	2008/9	2009	
Kazakhstan	Media Forum	2007	2009	
Latvia	For Fatherland and Freedom/LNNK	2002	2009	Alliance of European Conservatives and Reformists
Lithuania	Lithuanian Peasant Popular Union	?	2009	
Lithuania	Order and Justice	?	2009	Movement for a Europe of Liberties and Democracy
Luxembourg	Alternative Democratic Reform Party	2002	2010	Alliance of European Conservatives and Reformists
Malta	Malta Conservative Party	2002	bef 2006	
Poland	Law and Justice	?	2009	Alliance of European Conservatives and Reformists
Poland	National Conservative League	2002	bef 2006	
Portugal	Democratic and Social Centre – People's Party	2002	bef 2006	European People's Party
Romania	National Liberal Party	?	2006/7	Alliance of Liberals and Democrats for Europe Party
Russia	Democratic Party of Russia	2002	bef 2006	
Slovakia	Movement for Democracy	2004	2008/9	Movement for a Europe of Liberties and Democracy
Slovakia	Slovak National Party	2002	2009	
Ukraine	Congress of Ukrainian Nationalists	?	2009	

== See also ==
- European political party
- Authority for European Political Parties and European Political Foundations
- European political foundation
