= Nick Adams (commentator) =

Australian-American political commentator and author (born 1984)

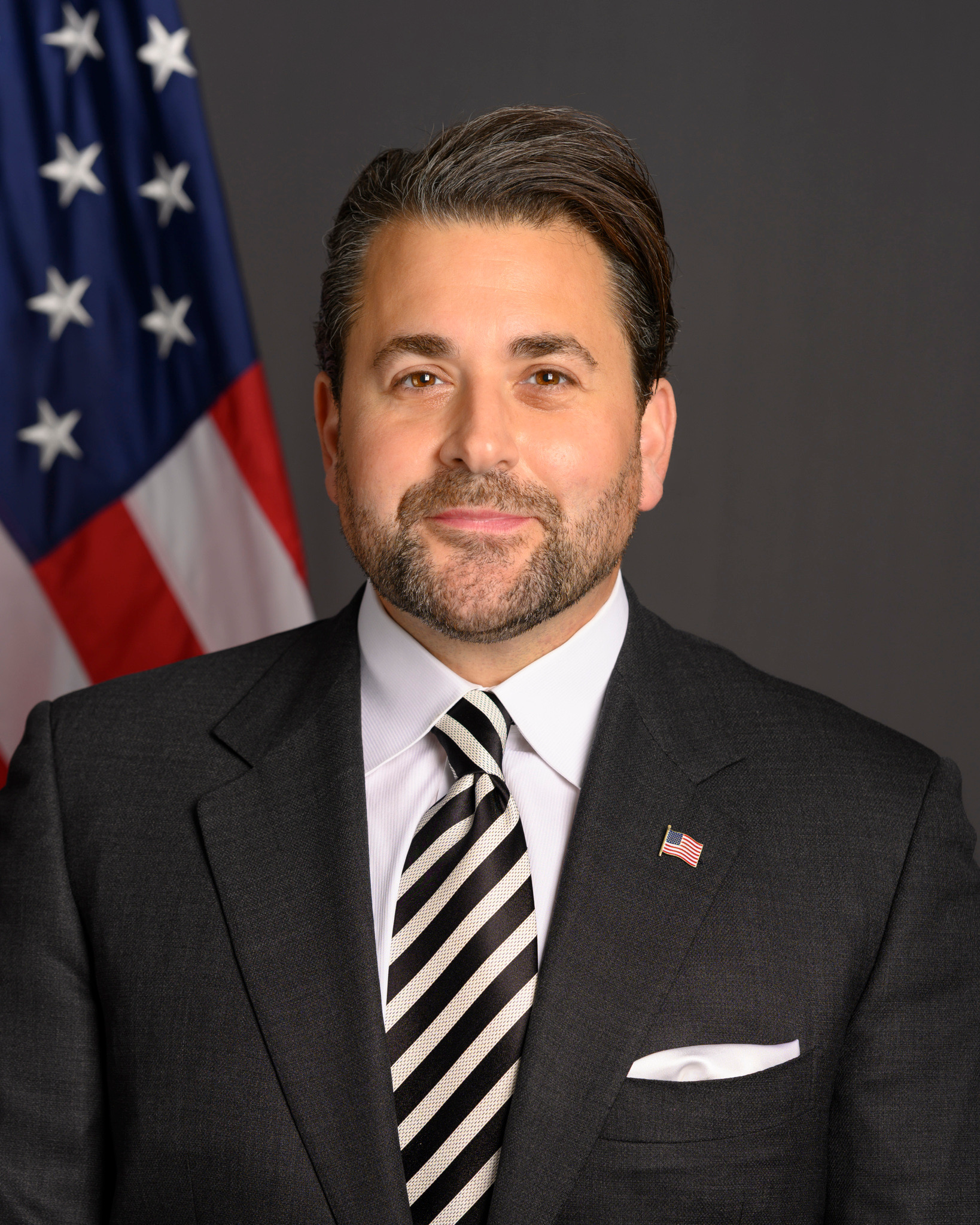
- Official portrait, 2026

Special Presidential Envoy for American Tourism, Exceptionalism, and Values
- Incumbent
- Assumed office March 17, 2026
- President: Donald Trump
- Preceded by: Position established

Councillor of the Municipality of Ashfield for North Ward
- In office March 27, 2004 – September 8, 2012

Deputy Mayor of Ashfield
- In office September 13, 2005 – September 12, 2006
- Mayor: Rae Desmond Jones
- Preceded by: Caroline Stott
- Succeeded by: Caroline Stott

Personal details
- Born: Nicholas Adamopoulos; September 5, 1984 (age 42) Sydney, New South Wales, Australia
- Citizenship: Australia; United States (since 2021)
- Party: Republican (United States)
- Other political affiliations: Liberal (Australia, until 2009)
- Education: University of Sydney
- Occupation: author; commentator; motivational speaker
- Website: https://www.state.gov/biographies/nick-adams/

Nick Adams (born Nicholas Adamopoulos; September 5, 1984) is an Australian-American conservative political commentator, author, and diplomat.

In 2026, Donald Trump created the new Special Presidential Envoy for American Tourism, Exceptionalism, and Values position and tapped Adams for the position directly after his nomination for United States Ambassador to Malaysia expired. Adams' nomination was met with media controversy and opposition in Malaysia.

Adams has written ten books, several of which have forewords written by prominent right-wing American politicians and media personalities. He came to public attention in 2017, when Donald Trump made favorable comments and tweets about his books Green Card Warrior and Retaking America, and in 2020 about his book Trump and Churchill.

He is best known for his messaging of aggressively promoting Donald Trump and describing himself as an "alpha male." He has been labeled a "social media heavyweight", a "Trump-backed raconteur", and a "far-right culture warrior" for his conservative social media advocacy and aggressive persona. Prior to his rise to prominence in the MAGA movement, Adams was a motivational speaker best known for his promotion of civics education, American exceptionalism, and free market capitalism.

Adams has been granted honorary resident status or received commendations from eleven states, including Texas, Kentucky, Oklahoma, Nebraska, Arkansas, South Carolina, Tennessee, Indiana, Nevada, Missouri, and Arizona.

== Early life and education ==
Adams was born Nikolaos Adamopoulos in Sydney, Australia. His father was a Greek Australian math teacher named Andrew and his mother is a German Australian named Angelika who worked as a carer in a retirement home but now has a paid position as Secretary in Adams's non-profit organization. He was raised in a strict household with parental expectations of being successful, and his father never told him, "I love you". His father died in 2021 from COVID pneumonia.

From 16 months of age until he was about 4 years old, Adams was treated for Stage IV neuroblastoma. An American doctor working in the emergency room of an Australian hospital recommended that he be tested for the cancer, which he credits in part for his love of the United States.

Adams attended Trinity Grammar School, where he graduated valedictorian of his class. He took classes in television presenting and acting at the National Institute of Dramatic Art. At the University of Sydney, Adams earned a degree in journalism. While attending university he was elected to be a councilman of his suburb in 2004, and deputy mayor in 2005.

== Life in Australia ==
Adams was a municipal councilor from 2004–2012, and deputy mayor for the 2005–2006 term.

In March 2004, Adams was 19 years old and attending university. He also ran for a position on the Ashfield council as a Liberal (Australia's main conservative party). Ashfield no longer has an independent council, but when Adams was elected the council had four geographic wards and each ward elected three councilors. The municipality had a population of about 40,000 people and the North Ward had about 6,000 people enrolled to vote. Adams represented the North Ward, where he lived with his mother. The councilor position was a 4-year term, with the councilors voting on council policy, budgets, and services and representing the concerns of the people in their respective wards.

In September 2005, the twelve councilors elected a mayor and deputy mayor to serve one-year terms. Adams was elected to the deputy mayor position, the youngest person to be elected to that position in Australia. Adams stated he wanted to be a councilor to improve economic growth for the area and privately expressed the goal of eventually becoming the Prime Minister of Australia. He put forward a motion to cull all the pigeons due to fears of the bird flu and suggested the town use DNA tests to identify dog owners who did not pick up their pets' feces. He was deputy mayor only for one year, as the councilors did not nominate him for the September 2006 election. Instead, in October of that year the councilors formally condemned him for "racking up thousands of dollars worth of phone calls and cab charges for personal benefit". Mark Drury, a former member of the council, said that if Adams "didn't have a stunt, he wouldn't turn up to meetings".

In 2008, he ran for re-election to his councilor position. He no longer lived in the North Ward but a business owner named Adams as their nominated elector, which was a loophole that Adams exploited to stand for re-election. During his second term as councilor, he spoke out against multiculturalism and frequently missed meetings as he tried to become a motivational speaker in the United States. In 2009, when a journalist asked him about the absences, Adams responded with a tirade of expletives; as a result, the Liberal Party of Australia threatened to suspend Adams from the party for six months for conduct likely to "embarrass or cause damage to" the party. However, Adams resigned from the party before he could be suspended, and he retired from Australian politics in 2012.

In 2010, Adams was the public relations consultant for a store that sold Halloween costumes. He devised "The Halloween Institute", a group of paid lingerie models who were purportedly demanding that Halloween become a public holiday in Australia.

== Immigration to the United States ==
Adams met with an immigration lawyer in 2009 and then in the following years self-published two small books: America: The Greatest Good and Exceptional America. He met with an immigration lawyer again in 2011, and the following year he applied for a green card as an alien of extraordinary ability (EB-1A) (also called the "Einstein Visa"). Extraordinary ability usually is demonstrated through international acclaim in one's field such as being awarded a Nobel prize or Olympic medal, but the law and Kazarian v. USCIS define other pieces of evidence that can be considered, such as writing scholarly articles, being the subject of articles in major media, and maintaining a leading role in distinguished organizations. To bolster his application, he hit the speaking circuit and got letters of support from others (for example, then-Texas Governor Rick Perry named Adams an "honorary Texan" in 2013), sought legal advice about creating a nonprofit, the Foundation for Liberty and American Greatness (FLAG), to influence civics education in American schools, and began writing The American Boomerang, which was published in 2014 through an arm of WorldNetDaily (WND), a far-right website known for promoting conspiracy theories.

In addition to extraordinary ability, the Einstein Visa process also evaluates the petitioner's ability to support themselves. Because it is not based on a job offer or employer sponsorship, immigration services look at a combination of factors to determine whether the petitioner will likely not depend on government assistance, such as age, health, family, education, assets, resources, and skills. Since an Einstein Visa is given to people with international acclaim, it is usually easy for these petitioners to show "evidence of support". However, during Adams's interview at the Consulate office, his bank statements and paying work history did not show sufficient evidence. They declined to issue Adams a visa, and immediately his father gave him $200,000 so he could petition for a further review with new proof of financial ability. A few months later, the consul recommended a revocation, as they did not believe Adams qualified for the Einstein Visa based on their interview, the documentation, and the original petition.

According to Adams, after the rejection he no longer had any funds; he asked his lawyer to work for free, and scoured social media to find the accounts for the consulate worker who interviewed him. He uncovered the worker's sexual and political orientation, and from this Adams concluded that the worker delayed returning his passport during the extra review that Adams requested. Against legal advice to not enter the US with his visa application in review, Adams planned a book tour for his next book (Retaking America). After a 78-day book tour and meeting with several Republican elected officials, he returned to Australia. His visa was approved; he concluded: 'I had taken on the State Department under President Obama, and won' and decided the first action his nonprofit would take, would be to have the worker at the US Consulate in Sydney fired from their job.

His green card petition was approved in July 2016. After the required five years of permanent residency, he became a naturalized US citizen in December 2021.

== Life in the United States ==
Near the end of his first term in office, President Trump appointed Adams to a six-year term on the Board of the Woodrow Wilson International Center for Scholars, a nonpartisan think tank focusing on global affairs. Some members of the center's staff found his presence on the board to be an "embarrassment" because of his misogyny. As of mid-2026, Adams remains a member of the Board, even as a March 2026 executive order drastically cut funding for the Center's staff and operations.

Adams was a surrogate for Trump's 2020 reelection campaign. After Trump's loss, Adams promoted the false claim that the 2020 presidential election was stolen from Donald Trump. During the Biden presidency, Adams frequently criticizing the Biden family outside the scope of policy and politics. Adams was again a surrogate and advisor for Trump in his 2024 presidential campaign.

Adams, in conjunction with FLAG and former interns for Antonin Scalia, has produced and distributed kid-friendly versions of the American constitution that promote constitutional rights and originalism.

=== US Ambassador-designate to Malaysia ===
On July 9, 2025, Adams was nominated by President Donald Trump to be the next US Ambassador to Malaysia. Adams' nomination was questioned by international media, including the South China Morning Post, which described the appointment as having "raised questions about Washington's commitment to continuity in its mission in Malaysia." The Post characterized US–Malaysia relations as in a challenging period amidst the Gaza War and trade tensions as a result of Trump's tariffs.

Parti Keadilan Rakyat's Youth International Relations Bureau's Arief Izuadin expressed concern about Adams' nomination, citing his extremist background. Selangor Parti Islam SeMalaysia Youth Chief Mohamed Sukri Omar also made a statement advocating for Malaysia's Ministry of Foreign Affairs to take a firm stance against the nomination. Sukri also stated that "Nick Adams is not just a controversial figure. He openly spreads hatred towards Islam and supports the Zionist colonial regime without consideration...This appointment is an insult to the sensitivities of Malaysians. If the government remains silent or accepts this appointment, it will be seen as betraying the people's firm stance in supporting the Palestinian cause." Former Malaysian law minister Zaid Ibrahim and former health minister Khairy Jamaluddin have criticized the appointment saying Malaysia "should not be treated as a dumping ground for ideological firebrands and partisan." Zaid also added that Adams' nomination "would not be a gesture of goodwill-it would be an insult." Former Malaysian Foreign Minister Saifuddin Abdullah said of Adams, "it would be good to have a U.S. ambassador who is very close to Trump... but you cannot compromise on certain principles." The Sydney Morning Herald stated that Adams' appointment as ambassador "in Muslim-majority Malaysia has gone down, of course, like a lead balloon." It was also reported that there were about 60 protestors outside the US Embassy in Kuala Lumpur against this appointment.

In February 2026, it was reported that Adams had not been renominated to the post, at which time he was quoted as saying he had been, "promoted from the role of Ambassador". The decision to not renominate Adams was well received in Malaysia.

=== Special Presidential Envoy for American Tourism, Exceptionalism, and Values ===
On March 17, 2026, Adams was appointed by President Donald Trump to serve as Special Presidential Envoy for American Tourism, Exceptionalism, and Values. The White House lauded the controversial Adams as "an America First patriot who will represent our country well" when asked for comment regarding his appointment.

The position, which has not previously existed, has been described as being a "brand ambassador" for the United States of America, and "US Tourism Minister".

Adams' appointment came at a time when international visitation to the United States was in decline in 2025, with travel outlets reporting that Adams had been tasked by the White House with improving traveler confidence and promoting the United States ahead of a decade of hosting major international events.

In May of 2026, Adams delivered his first major international public address in the role, speaking at a World Travel & Tourism Council event. Adams' remarks emphasized international cooperation, investment, and public-private partnerships as key to restoring America's tourism economy.

Adams announced a personal goal for the United States to reach an average of 100 million international visitors per year by 2030, arguing that major events such as America's 250th anniversary, the 2026 FIFA World Cup, the 2028 Los Angeles Olympics and Paralympics, and other global sporting events create a major tourism opportunity.

Adams has suggested that Donald Trump is the United States' "greatest marketer," running contrary to the views of many in the tourism industry. Adams has blamed the dip in international visitors to the United States on "people in the media that don't like the president" building false narratives that "America unsafe, that America is expensive, that Americans are inhospitable, that America does not welcome people." Adams also denied the existence of a social media policy that could require international visitors to provide a five-year personal social media history to border agents upon entry to the United States, calling it an "egregious misconception."

Adams was the keynote speaker at the European Economic Forum 2026, a conference hosted by the European Conservatives and Reformists Party, alongside prominent European far right politicians such as former UK Prime Minister Liz Truss, George Simion, and Antonio Giordano. Adams was the only government official from the United States to address the conference.

Adams made a special visit to Maui and Oahu, Hawaii in September 2026. He expressed support for Maui's pre-clearance initiative and spoke at the State Hawaii Tourism Conference on September 24th.

=== Political activism ===
Adams has fiercely defended First Lady Melania Trump in the press and on social media.

In addition to appearing regularly on mainstream outlets like Fox News, CNN, and MSNBC, Adams has appeared on various other far-right media outlets, including Newsmax TV and One America News Network. Adams has appeared on C-SPAN 12 times as of April 2026. Adams has been a columnist for Townhall and a "Centennial Institute Policy Fellow" at Colorado Christian University. Adams was named a "Fox News Contributor" in 2018.

In 2024, Adams joined Outkick, a right-wing sports and pop culture publication founded by Clay Travis, as a columnist.

In addition to the Foundation for Liberty and American greatness, Adams also runs 1A Warriors, a nonprofit seeking to codify civil rights related to free speech issues.

== Public image ==
Luke Winkie, writing for Slate, said that beginning in 2022, "I and a great number of other people outside of [Adams'] target demographic have noticed a fascinating shift in Adams' Twitter verbiage—one that reveals the faintest hint that maybe, just maybe, this has all been a bit." Winkie stated he came to this conclusion after seeing Adams' obsessive tweets about Hooters, as well as his tweets regarding having a "foursome with the boys" (Adams contests that the foursome is in regard to golfing partners). Calling Adams "a mystery that nobody can solve", Winkie hypothesised that he is actually a far-right Republican, but as the popularity of Donald Trump has declined, Adams found it beneficial to be a "weird, self-reflexive, tongue-in-cheek interpretation of [Trumpism]". Adams also sells "Alpha Male"–branded merchandise including hats, shirts and mugs, which may reveal that profit is behind Adams' alleged routine. Ben Terris writing in The Washington Post said that Adams' routine of "MAGA manhood is so over-the-top, so uncanny that it almost seems like performance art". Adams' hired security guard has compared him to Andy Kaufman, a comedian known for never breaking character.

However, a number of figures have defended Adams and said that his rhetoric is serious. Isaac Smith, a Board Member for the D.C. Young Republicans, said that he believes Adams is "sincere" and he is "taking things that are real and playing them up to the nth degree". Tex Fischer, a Republican strategist, has said Adams "really likes winding people up" and rehashed story of Adams going out to dinner with a chapter president of Turning Point USA and introducing him to the waitress as a famous porn star in a voice audible enough for the whole restaurant to hear. Fischer argues Adams is not playing a character because "he is a character". In an interview with The Washington Post, Adams said "This is not a character...This is not a bit. It's not trolling. Anyone who thinks this is not me, that I don't eat steak, that I don't drink ice-cold domestics, that I don't repel woke beer, they're wrong. They're absolutely wrong". A high-ranking Australian government official said of Adams, "he's a lot more intelligent than what people give him credit for. He would play on issues that would deliver him media attention and give him the spotlight." Australian political observers have noted a throughline from Adams' antics while on council to his pro-Trump "antics" in the United States.

Adams opposes education regarding LGBTQ topics in schools and said that only a bad parent would take their children to see a drag queen show. LGBTQ Nation, an online news magazine, has alleged Adams' apparent hypocrisy on this topic as he has suggested taking children to Hooters.

Adams has been described as "MAGA, macho, and ultraconservative" by France's leading newspaper, Le Monde.

Adams has called on the American people to resist, "cultural decline, defend free speech, and reject cancel culture," and opposed the so-called "war on young men".

Adams is opposed to the metric system, referring to its proponents as, "sissy European socialists."

Despite holding multiple college degrees from the University of Sydney, Adams has criticized higher education, arguing it is not necessary to achieve to the American Dream. Adams has encouraged students to pursue trade school or apprenticeships in lieu of a college education.

Adams is a denier of climate change, calling it, "the most significant fraud perpetrated on humanity this century."

On his Twitter account, Adams posted against alleged efforts to "teach Islam in schools" and described those expressing solidarity with Palestinians as supporters of terrorism. In 2024, Adams posted on Twitter: "If you don't stand with Israel, you stand with terrorists!"

Adams is a supporter of unrestricted gun rights. He referred to the success of Australia's gun laws as a "myth" and opposed efforts to replicate those policies in the United States, as he claimed it would turn the country into a "mamby pamby society."

=== Social media advocacy and controversies ===
Adams is known for his use of social media and has been described as a "Twitter troll". On Twitter, he has described himself as a "wildly successful alpha male", claimed that Donald Trump has "a better backhand than Roger Federer" and said "raise your children to be like Kid Rock and Kyle Rittenhouse, NOT Taylor Swift and Harry Styles!"

Adams has frequently attacked Meghan Markle, the Duchess of Sussex, on social media, posting at least 18 tweets denigrating Markle between December 2022 and December 2023 alone.

Adams has particularly shown extreme hostility towards the Super Bowl Halftime Show. He claimed to have "not watched" Bad Bunny perform at the Super Bowl LX Halftime Show, despite multiple social media posts explaining specific details of the show he found offensive. He claimed Rihanna's Super Bowl LVII Halftime Show was "Satanic", and called the Super Bowl LVI Halftime Show "a halftime show full of criminals", while suggesting Ted Nugent, Kid Rock, and Lee Greenwood would have been better options.

Adams is prone to telling stories that are unlikely to be true, but present Trump in a positive light. For instance, Adams posted a story on Twitter in 2024 about "two attractive college educated Latina career women", who "disliked Biden's [State of the Union] speech, and [stated] that they miss President Trump". The women then went on to praise Adams' muscles and then a "crowd had gathered to cheer me on...the sound of my masculine grunts broken only by the two [women] counting my reps in unison". Adams has defended these posts saying that his "stories are true stories". In early 2026, Adams posted a lengthy, and likely fabricated, story on X about the popularity of the Amazon documentary Melania. The post was went viral, and has been viewed over 15 million times as of May 2026.

== Personal life ==
Adams was previously married to Sadie Montanus; the couple later divorced. He became an American citizen in 2021. He is fluent in three languages, English, German, and Greek.

== Bibliography ==
- Adams, Nick (2010). America: The Greatest Good. iUniverse. ISBN 978-1450253956.
- Adams, Nick (2012). Exceptional America: A Message of Hope from a Modern-day De Tocqueville. iUniverse. ISBN 978-1475917680.
- Adams, Nick (2014). The American Boomerang: How the World's Greatest 'Turnaround' Nation Will Do It Again. Foreword by Allen West. WorldNetDaily (WND) Books. ISBN 978-1-936488-84-1.
- Adams, Nick (2015). 10 Reasons America is the Greatest Country in the History of the World! (PDF). Pamphlet self-published with Turning Point USA.
- Adams, Nick (2016). Green Card Warrior: My Quest for Legal Immigration in an Illegals' System. New York, New York: Post Hill Press. ISBN 978-1-68261-305-4.
- Adams, Nick (2016). Retaking America: Crushing Political Correctness. Foreword by Dennis Prager. New York, New York: Post Hill Press. ISBN 978-1-68261-421-1.
- Adams, Nick; Erickson, Dave (2017). The Case Against the Establishment. Foreword by Pete Hegseth. New York, New York: Post Hill Press. ISBN 978-1-68261-474-7.
- Adams, Nick (2019). Class Dismissed: Why College Isn't the Answer. New York, New York: Post Hill Press. ISBN 978-1-64293-068-9.
- Adams, Nick (2020). Trump and Churchill: Defenders of Western Civilization. Foreword by Newt Gingrich. New York, New York: Post Hill Press. ISBN 978-1-64293-469-4.
- Adams, Nick (2021). Trump and Reagan: Defenders of America. New York, New York: Post Hill Press. ISBN 978-1642937718.
- Adams, Nick (2022). The Most Dangerous President in History. New York, New York: Post Hill Press. ISBN 978-1-63758-657-0.
- Adams, Nick (2023). Kenny the Koala Comes to the USA. New York, New York: Post Hill Press. ISBN 978-1637589076.
- Adams, Nick (2024). Alpha Kings. Foreword by Donald J. Trump. Pennsauken, New Jersey: BookBaby. ISBN 979-8-3509-4194-4.
- Adams, Nick (2025). From Mar-A-Lago to Mars: President Trump's Great American Comeback. Skyhorse Publishing. ISBN 978-1510784673.
