= New Direction (think tank) =

Right-wing to far-right European political foundation

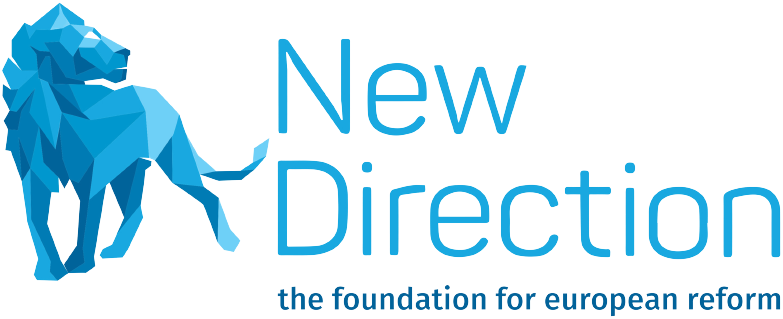
- President: Nicola Procaccini
- Secretary-General: Witold de Chevilly
- Founded: 2010; 16 years ago
- Headquarters: Rue du Trône 4, 1000 Brussels, Belgium
- Ideology: Conservatism; Economic liberalism Euroscepticism
- Political position: Right-wing
- Colours: Blue, white and pink

Website
- newdirection.online

New Direction – The Foundation for European Reform is a European political foundation, think tank and publisher affiliated with the European Conservatives and Reformists Party (ECR). It was established in 2010, under the patronage of Baroness Thatcher. It is based in Brussels with satellite offices in London and Warsaw. New Direction is a free-market think tank that promotes European reform through the strengthening of accountability, transparency and democracy.

Through publications, conferences and debates, New Direction is committed to serving as a resource for parliamentarians, policy makers and the public. New Direction is also a founding international partner of CapX, a digital service which commissions and aggregates news on popular capitalism from around the world.

== Executive team ==
The executive board and Senior Management team is made up Members of the European Parliament and policy experts.

The President of New Direction, MEP Nicola Procaccini, was the second most voted MEP from Fratelli d’Italia after Giorgia Meloni in the June 2024 European Parliament elections and serves as Co-President of the ECR Group in the European Parliament.

His two Vice Presidents are Robert Zīle, a Member of the European Parliament since 2004, representing the Nacionālā Apvienība party, a member of the ECR Group, and Vice President of the European Parliament; and Alexandr Vondra, a Member of the European Parliament since 2019 and a representative of the Občanská Demokratická Strana.

In September 2020, the Polish national Witold d'Humilly de Chevilly, Polish Electricity Association's Brussels lobbyist, was appointed as New Direction's executive director, and in May 2021 Robert Tyler, a British ECR strategist at the European Parliament, joined the foundation as a senior policy advisor.

Until January 2025, the President of the Foundation was Tomasz Poręba.

== History ==
New Direction was established in 2010 and draws its inspiration from the 2009 Prague Declaration, from which the Alliance of European Conservatives and Reformists (AECR) and the European Conservatives and Reformists group (ECR) in the European Parliament were founded. As of October 2016, the AECR is known as the Alliance of Conservatives and Reformists in Europe (ACRE).

New Direction is affiliated to the European Young Conservatives (EYC) and the International Democratic Union (IDU).

== Role and Mission ==
- Advancing Conservatism and a Europe of nation states:

New Direction's vision for Europe is for the advancement of small government, private property, free enterprise, lower taxes, family values, individual freedom, strong defence, a Europe of sovereign states and a strong trans-Atlantic alliance.

- Leading the debate on European reform:

The mission of New Direction is to strengthen the movement for European reform, by leading the debate on both sides of the Atlantic and around the world. The think tank aims to shift the EU onto a different course – away from the current orthodoxy of 'ever closer union' and central bureaucratic governance onto a path that promotes the freedom, prosperity and security of EU nations and their citizens.

- Influencing key players:

New Direction's strategy is to promote its values and ideas by influencing key players; ministers and elected officials from across Europe and the world, government officials, public policy experts, academics, business leaders, and the media. New Direction works closely with those who share a commitment to its values and works around the world to promote its constituent principles and issues.

New direction regularly hosts high-profile speakers including leading politicians and policy experts for panel discussions, interviews, roundtables, seminars, conferences, and public events in Europe, America, Asia and Africa.

The New Direction Academy was established to train young academics in strategic leadership, research and effective communications.

== Research and publications ==
New Direction publishes timely reports, discussion papers, policy memos, articles, opinion pieces and blogs to serve as a resource for parliamentarians, policy makers and the public.

It publishes on topics including the Eurozone, finance and the economy; energy and the environment, defence, foreign policy and security; accountability, transparency and efficiency; immigration, justice and society; and transatlantic relations.

== Initiatives, Prizes and Awards ==
The New Direction Liberty Award was created to honour people who have "rendered outstanding services to political culture, freedom and civil society." The annual jury for the award is made up of notable European politicians, academics and policy specialists.

Recipients of the award have included the former Head of British Military Intelligence in West Germany, Brigadier Geoffrey Van Orden MEP, and Professor Dr Gunnar Heinsohn.
