= Prague Declaration (disambiguation) =

Prague Declaration (Pražská deklarace) may refer to any number of declarations signed in Prague, since 1994 capital of the Czech Republic:

- 2016 – Prague Declaration signed by several European anti-Islam groups led by the German Pegida movement.
- 2012 – Prague Declaration signed by several members of various European Pirate Parties expressing the intent to cooperate on the creation of a common election program for the European Parliament election in 2014, on election campaigns and on realisation of said programme in the EP.
- 2009 – The Prague Declaration of the European Conservatives and Reformists Group - a document containing the founding principles of the European Conservatives and Reformists in the European Parliament.
- 2008 – Prague Declaration on European Conscience and Communism
- 2002 – Prague Summit Declaration, issued by the Heads of State and Government participating in the meeting of the North Atlantic Council during the 2002 Prague Summit.
- 2000 – Declaration adopted at the Forum 2000 annual meeting.

== See also ==
- Prague Manifesto (disambiguation)
