= Parties in the European Council during 2011 =

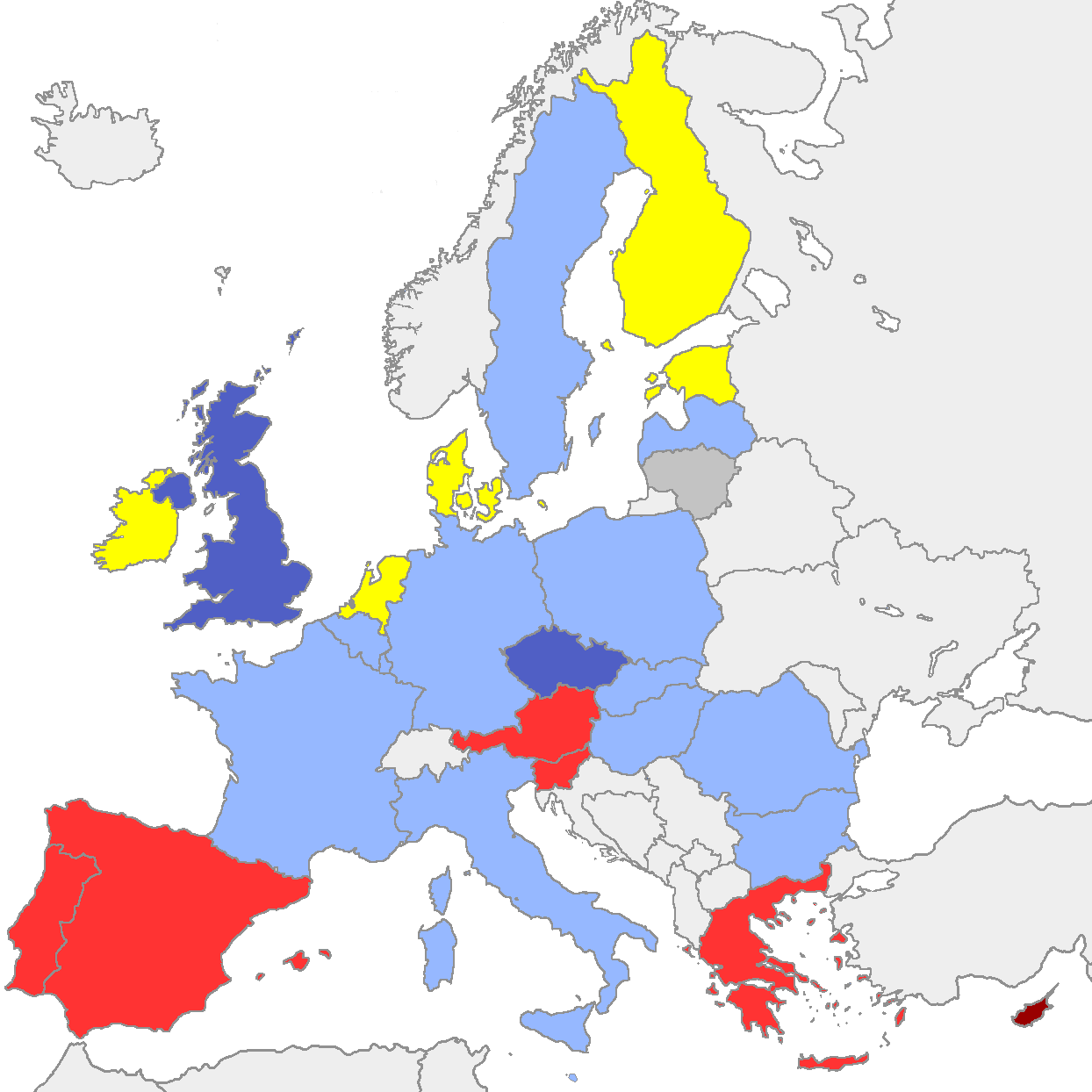
The member-states of the European Union by the European party affiliations of their leaders, as of 1 January 2011.

This article describes the party affiliations of leaders of each member-state represented in the European Council during the year 2011. The list below gives the political party that each head of government, or head of state, belongs to at the national level, as well as the European political alliance to which that national party belongs. The states are listed from most to least populous. More populous states have greater influence in the council, in accordance with the system of Qualified Majority Voting.

== Summary ==
Party	1 January 2011		9 March 2011		21 June 2011		22 June 2011		3 October 2011		11 November 2011		16 November 2011		6 December 2011		21 December 2011
Party	#	QMV	#	QMV	#	QMV	#	QMV	#	QMV	#	QMV	#	QMV	#	QMV	#	QMV
European People's Party	13	190	14	204	15	216	16	223	16	223	16	223	15	194	14	182	15	209
Party of European Socialists	5	65	5	65	4	53	4	53	5	60	4	48	4	48	5	60	4	33
Alliance of European Conservatives and Reformists	2	41	2	41	2	41	2	41	2	41	2	41	2	41	2	41	2	41
European Liberal Democrat and Reform Party	5	38	4	31	4	31	3	24	2	17	2	17	2	17	2	17	2	17
Independent	1	7	1	7	1	7	1	7	1	7	2	19	3	48	3	48	3	48
Party of the European Left	1	4	1	4	1	4	1	4	1	4	1	4	1	4	1	4	1	4

== List of leaders (1 January 2011) ==
Member-state	Votes	Leader	National party	European party
Germany	29	Angela Merkel	CDU	EPP
France	29	Nicolas Sarkozy	UMP	EPP
United Kingdom	29	David Cameron	Conservative	AECR
Italy	29	Silvio Berlusconi	PdL	EPP
Spain	27	José Luis Rodríguez Zapatero	PSOE	PES
Poland	27	Donald Tusk	PO	EPP
Romania	14	Traian Băsescu	Independent	EPP
Netherlands	13	Mark Rutte	VVD	ELDR
Greece	12	George Papandreou	PA.SO.K.	PES
Belgium	12	Yves Leterme	CD&V	EPP
Portugal	12	José Sócrates	PS	PES
Czech Republic	12	Petr Nečas	ODS	AECR
Hungary	12	Viktor Orbán	Fidesz	EPP
Sweden	10	Fredrik Reinfeldt	M	EPP
Austria	10	Werner Faymann	SPÖ	PES
Bulgaria	10	Boyko Borisov	GERB	EPP
Denmark	7	Lars Løkke Rasmussen	V	ELDR
Slovakia	7	Iveta Radičová	SDKÚ–DS	EPP
Finland	7	Mari Kiviniemi	Kesk.	ELDR
Ireland	7	Brian Cowen	FF	ELDR
Lithuania	7	Dalia Grybauskaitė	Independent
Latvia	4	Valdis Dombrovskis	JL	EPP
Slovenia	4	Borut Pahor	SD	PES
Estonia	4	Andrus Ansip	RE	ELDR
Cyprus	4	Demetris Christofias	AKEL	PEL
Luxembourg	4	Jean-Claude Juncker	CSV	EPP
Malta	3	Lawrence Gonzi	PN	EPP

Supported by PD-L AKEL holds only observer status with the Party of the European Left.

== Changes ==
=== Affiliation ===
Date	Member-state	Leader	National party	European party
9 March	Ireland	Enda Kenny	FG	EPP
21 June	Portugal	Pedro Passos Coelho	PPD/PSD	EPP
22 June	Finland	Jyrki Katainen	Kok.	EPP
3 October	Denmark	Helle Thorning-Schmidt	A	PES
11 November	Greece	Lucas Papademos	Independent
16 November	Italy	Mario Monti	Independent
6 December	Belgium	Elio Di Rupo	PS	PES
21 December	Spain	Mariano Rajoy	PP	EPP

== See also ==
- Presidency of the Council of the European Union
