= Parties in the European Council during 2010 =

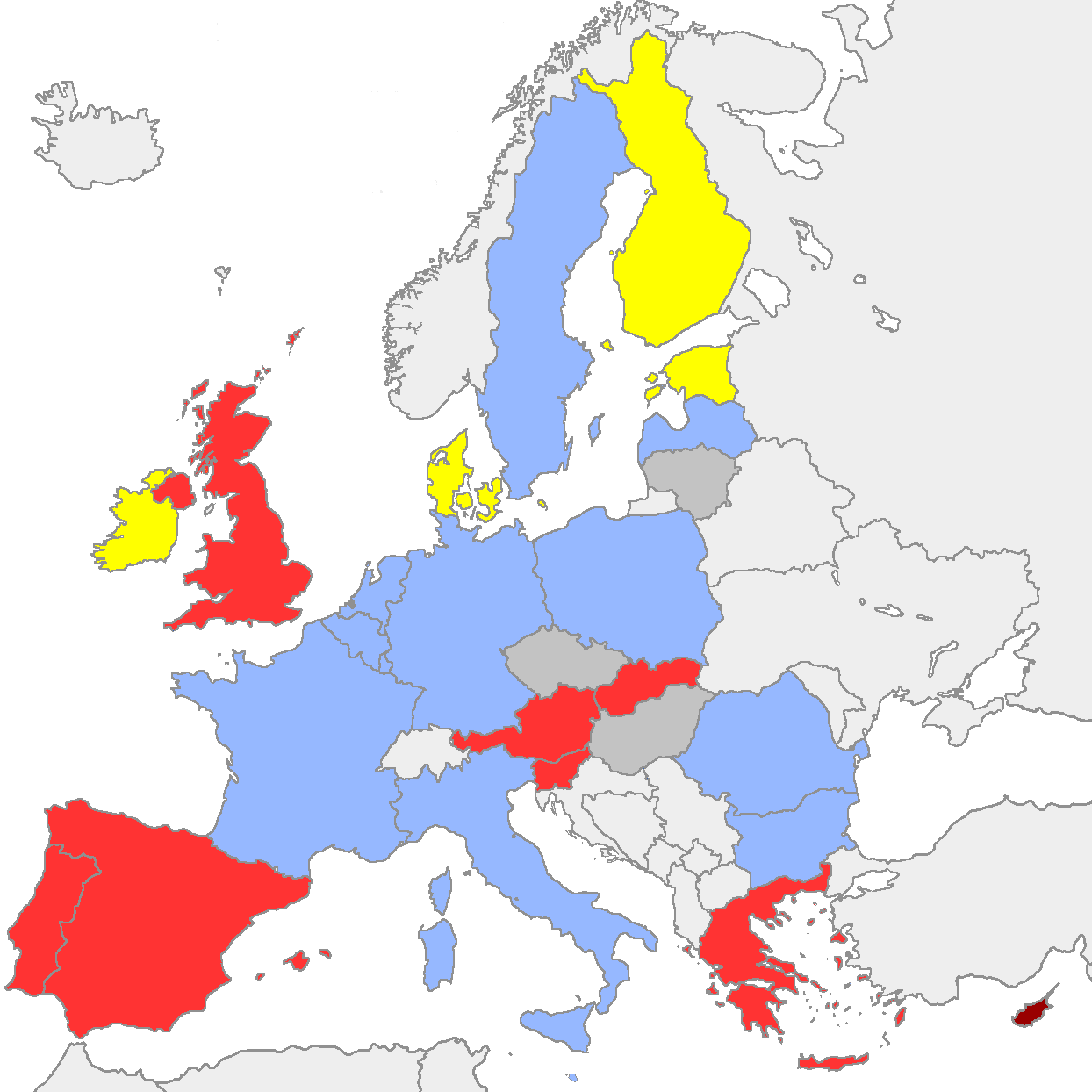
The member-states of the European Union by the European party affiliations of their leaders, as of 1 January 2010.

This article describes the party affiliations of leaders of each member-state represented in the European Council during the year 2010. The list below gives the political party that each head of government, or head of state, belongs to at the national level, as well as the European political alliance to which that national party belongs. The states are listed from most to least populous. More populous states have greater influence in the council, in accordance with the system of Qualified Majority Voting.

== Summary ==
| Party | 1 January 2010 | | 11 May 2010 | | 29 May 2010 | | 8 July 2010 | | 13 July 2010 | | 14 October 2010 |
| Party | # | QMV | # | QMV | # | QMV | # | QMV | # | QMV | # | QMV |
|---|---|---|---|---|---|---|---|---|---|---|---|---|
| European People's Party | 12 | 184 | 12 | 184 | 13 | 196 | 14 | 203 | 14 | 203 | 13 | 190 |
| Party of European Socialists | 7 | 101 | 6 | 72 | 6 | 72 | 5 | 65 | 5 | 65 | 5 | 65 |
| Independent | 3 | 31 | 3 | 31 | 2 | 19 | 2 | 19 | 1 | 7 | 1 | 7 |
| European Liberal Democrat and Reform Party | 4 | 25 | 4 | 25 | 4 | 25 | 4 | 25 | 4 | 25 | 5 | 38 |
| Party of the European Left | 1 | 4 | 1 | 4 | 1 | 4 | 1 | 4 | 1 | 4 | 1 | 4 |
| Alliance of European Conservatives and Reformists | 0 | 0 | 1 | 29 | 1 | 29 | 1 | 29 | 2 | 41 | 2 | 41 |

== List of leaders (1 January 2010) ==
| Member-state | Votes | Leader | National party | European party |
|---|---|---|---|---|
| Germany | 29 | Angela Merkel | CDU | EPP |
| France | 29 | Nicolas Sarkozy | UMP | EPP |
| United Kingdom | 29 | Gordon Brown | Lab | PES |
| Italy | 29 | Silvio Berlusconi | PdL | EPP |
| Spain | 27 | José Luis Rodríguez Zapatero | PSOE | PES |
| Poland | 27 | Donald Tusk | PO | EPP |
| Romania | 14 | Traian Băsescu | Independent | EPP |
| Netherlands | 13 | Jan Peter Balkenende | CDA | EPP |
| Greece | 12 | George Papandreou | PA.SO.K. | PES |
| Belgium | 12 | Yves Leterme | CD&V | EPP |
| Portugal | 12 | José Sócrates | PS | PES |
| Czech Republic | 12 | Jan Fischer | Independent |
| Hungary | 12 | Gordon Bajnai | Independent |
| Sweden | 10 | Fredrik Reinfeldt | M | EPP |
| Austria | 10 | Werner Faymann | SPÖ | PES |
| Bulgaria | 10 | Boyko Borisov | GERB | EPP |
| Denmark | 7 | Lars Løkke Rasmussen | V | ELDR |
| Slovakia | 7 | Robert Fico | SMER-SD | PES |
| Finland | 7 | Matti Vanhanen | Kesk. | ELDR |
| Ireland | 7 | Brian Cowen | FF | ELDR |
| Lithuania | 7 | Dalia Grybauskaitė | Independent |
| Latvia | 4 | Valdis Dombrovskis | JL | EPP |
| Slovenia | 4 | Borut Pahor | SD | PES |
| Estonia | 4 | Andrus Ansip | RE | ELDR |
| Cyprus | 4 | Demetris Christofias | AKEL | PEL |
| Luxembourg | 4 | Jean-Claude Juncker | CSV | EPP |
| Malta | 3 | Lawrence Gonzi | PN | EPP |

Supported by PD-L AKEL holds only observer status with the Party of the European Left.

== Changes ==
=== Affiliation ===
| Date | Member-state | Leader | National party | European party |
| 11 May | United Kingdom | David Cameron | Con | AECR |
| 29 May | Hungary | Viktor Orbán | Fidesz | EPP |
| 8 July | Slovakia | Iveta Radičová | SDKÚ–DS | EPP |
| 13 July | Czech Republic | Petr Nečas | ODS | AECR |
| 14 October | Netherlands | Mark Rutte | VVD | ELDR |

=== Office-holder only ===
| Date | Member-state | Leader | National party | European party |
|---|---|---|---|---|
| 22 June | Finland | Mari Kiviniemi | Kesk. | ELDR |

== See also ==
- Presidency of the Council of the European Union
