= 2014 European Parliament election in Bulgaria =

- 25 May 2014

All 17 Bulgarian seats to the European Parliament
- Turnout: 35.84% ▼
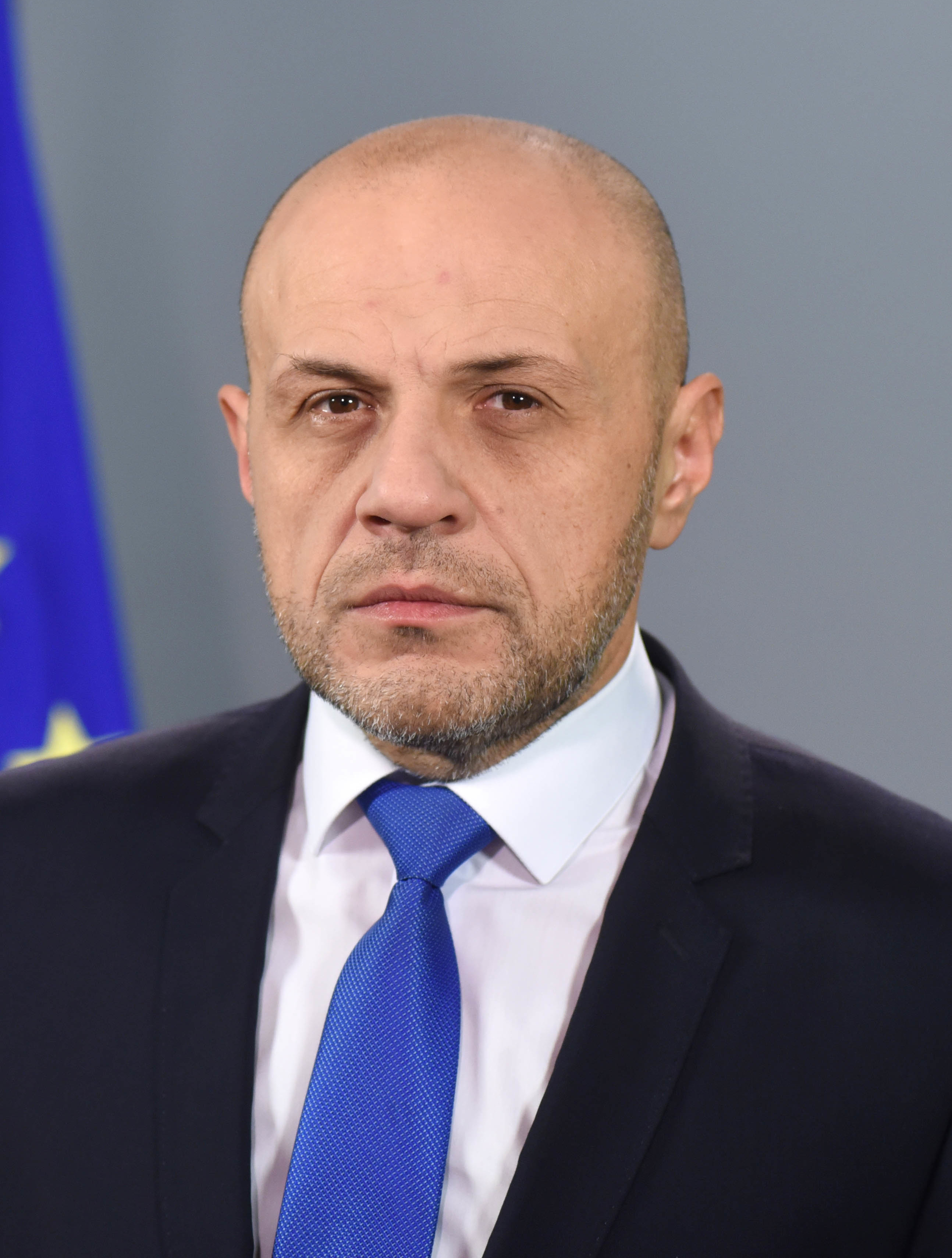

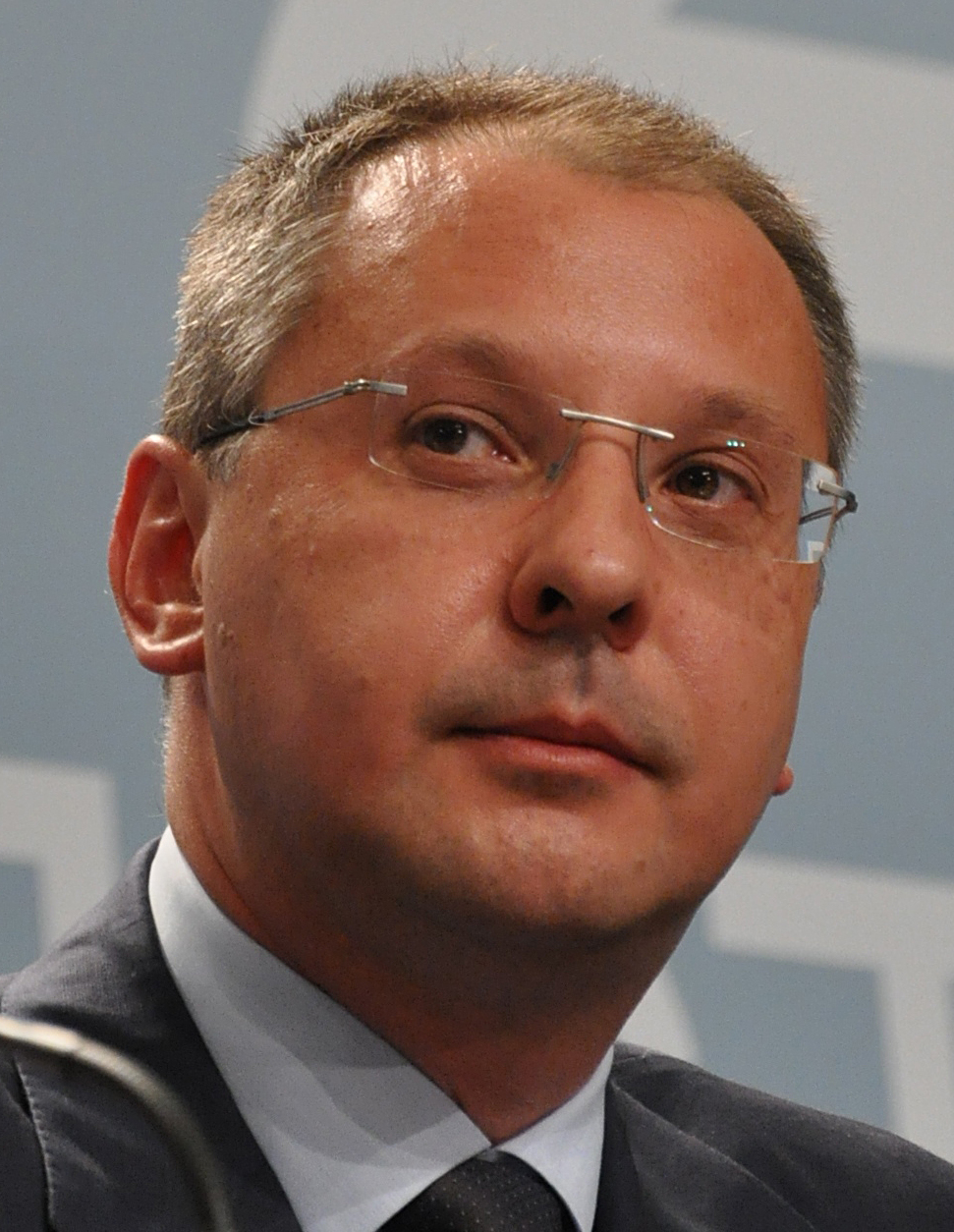

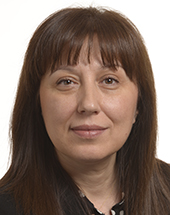

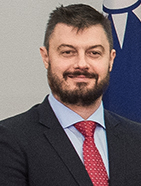

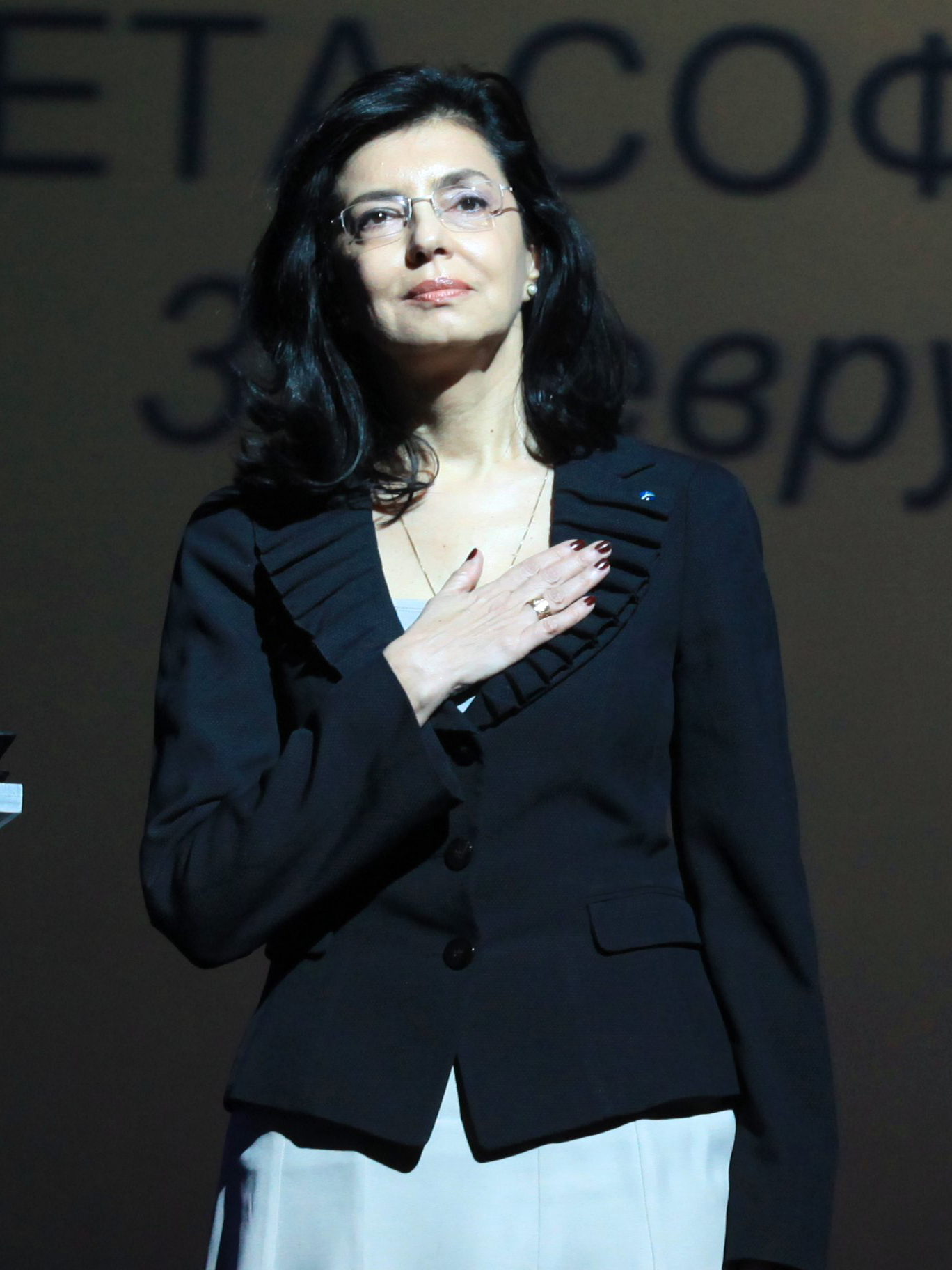

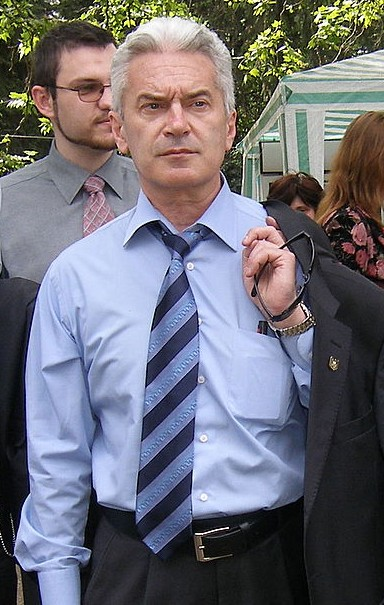
	First party	Second party	Third party
Leader	Tomislav Donchev	Sergei Stanishev	Filiz Hyusmenova
Party	GERB	BSP	DPS
Alliance	EPP	S&D	ALDE
Last election	5 seats, 24.36%	4 seats, 18.50%	3 seats, 14.14%
Seats won	6	4	4
Seat change	▲1	Steady	▲1
Popular vote	680,838	424,037	386,725
Percentage	30.40%	18.93%	17.26%
Swing	▲6.04	▲0.44	▲3.12
	Fourth party	Fifth party	Sixth party
Leader	Nikolay Barekov	Meglena Kuneva	Volen Siderov
Party	BBT—VMRO	RB	Attack
Alliance	ECR	EPP	NI
Last election	—	1 seat, 7.95%	2 seats, 11.96%
Seats won	2	1	0
Seat change	▲2	▼1	▼2
Popular vote	238,629	144,532	66,210
Percentage	10.66%	6.45%	2.96%
Swing	New	▼1.50	▼9.00

An election of the Members of the European Parliament from Bulgaria to the European Parliament was held on 25 May 2014 as part of the larger European Parliament election. After a decision by the European Council in 2013, Bulgaria was allocated 17 seats in the European Parliament for the Eighth European Parliament.

The election campaign officially began on 25 April 2014, one month before the election day.

== Background ==
The elections come a year after the 2013 parliamentary elections in Bulgaria that resulted in a minority parliament. Since the election winner, GERB, failed to form a government the Socialists and the DPS formed a coalition government led by Plamen Oresharski. The European elections of 2014 are considered to be of importance as they will reflect the popularity of the current government.

== Changes in electoral law ==
In February 2014 Bulgarian MPs voted to lower the preferential-vote threshold for the election from 6% to 5% of each list's total votes.

Implicit electoral threshold still remains equal to the Hare Quota, which is about 5.88% of the total valid votes.

== Opinion polls ==
Polls include Bulgarian parliamentary election polls if European parliamentary election polling numbers are unavailable.

=== Pre election campaign ===
Pre election campaign polls
Source	Date	GERB	BSP	DPS	Attack	Reformist Bloc	BBT	NFSB	ABV	Others	Total
Sova Haris	21 July 2013	16.9%	19.3%	7.8%	2.3%	3.9%	–	2.3%	–	1.8%	54.3%
Alpha Research	27 August 2013	15.6%	18.4%	5.8%	1.5%	7.6%	–	3.1%	–	21.6%	73.6%
Alpha Research	25 September 2013	15.6%	17.9%	5.8%	1.5%	7.6%	–	3.1%	–	21.6%	73.6%
Institute for Modern Politics	28 September 2013	16.6%	18.5%	5.8%	1.4%	5.6%	–	1.9%	–	16.5%	66.3%
Afis	29 September 2013	19.9%	21.2%	6.5%	2.5%	3.3%	–	2.8%	–	7.8%	64.0%
Sova Haris	24 October 2013	19.5%	21.7%	5.3%	2.0%	3.8%	2.4%	1.9%	–	0.7%	57.3%
Alpha Research	31 October 2013	16.5%	16.9%	6.1%	3.0%	6.4%	–	2.6%	–	8.2%	59.7%
Institute for Modern Politics	10 November 2013	26.2%	26.2%	8.1%	1.3%	8.2%	6.1%	1.9%	–	–	78.0%
Mediana	18 November 2013	16.9%	22.8%	7.6%	2.8%	8.6%	4.3%	2.9%	–	2.9%	68.8%
Gallup	19 November 2013	18.1%	21.4%	5.9%	2.4%	6.7%	–	–	–	–	54.5%
Sova Haris	4 December 2013	16.3%	21.3%	5.5%	2.7%	4.3%	3.0%	1.3%	–	1.2%	55.6%
Alpha Research	8 December 2013	15.8%	16.5%	6.1%	2.7%	6.9%	–	3.5%	–	9.7%	61.2%
AFIS	12 December 2013	18%	22%	5%	2%	5%	3%	1%	–	10%	66%
Focus	13 December 2013	23.5%	22.3%	5.5%	2.7%	5.8%	3%	3%	–	–	65.8%
Institute for Modern Politics	17 December 2013	21.0%	21.2%	4.8%	1.9%	4.8%	5.0%	1.9%	–	–	60.6%
Gallup	18 December 2013	18.0%	22.8%	6.1%	1.8%	4.8%	2.1%	1.6%	–	3.5%	60.7%
Sova Haris	15 January 2014	18.4%	19.5%	6.8%	2.3%	4.2%	3.0%	1.5%	–	0.8%	56.5%
Gallup	16 January 2014	18.1%	21.6%	5.8%	1.5%	4.8%	2.5%	2.1%	–	3.5%	59.9%
Alpha Research	22 January 2014	17.8%	15.0%	6.0%	2.5%	5.2%	2.6%	3.1%	7.0%	3.2%	62.4%
Modern Institute for Politics	31 January 2014	19.8%	20.5%	4.3%	1.6%	4.5%	5.6%	1.5%	1.0%	4.0%	62.8%
Medina	7 February 2014	19.3%	24.8%	9.5%	<2.8%	6.4%	7.1%	3.3%	1.9%	-	72.3%
Gallup	10 February 2014	17.7%	18.9%	6.7%	1.6%	4.6%	6.1%	1.3%	6.0%	3.4%	66.3%
Focus	11 February 2014	21.7%	19.2	6.0%	1.8%	5.6%	6.0%	3.0%	6.0%	5.1%	74.4%
Alpha Research	22 February 2014	16.9%	15.1%	6.9%	2.1%	5.0%	5.5%	3.2%	6.1%	5.8%	66.6%
Metapolls	28 February 2014	25.4%	22.7%	10.4%	3.2%	7.5%	8.3%	4.8%	9.2%	8.7%	100%
Gallup	13 March 2014	20.7%	19.5%	6.0%	2.5%	3.1%	5.0%	1.9%	3.2%	8.6%	70.5%
Metapolls	13 March 2014	29.4%	27.7%	8.7%	3.5%	–	7.1%	–	4.5%	19.3%	100%
Alpha Research	24 March 2014	17.4%	15.2%	6.5%	2.0%	5.1%	5.2%	3.6%	4.0%	5.5%	64.5%
Sova Haris	25 March 2014	20.6%	21.9%	7.0%	2.2%	2.8%	6.6%	0.9%	2.4%	0.6%	65.0%
Gallup	3 April 2014	20.9%	20.0%	6.4%	2.2%	2.1%	5.3%	2.4%	3.5%	8.1%	70.9%
Medina	5 April 2014	19.6%	21.9%	8.8%	2.5%	3.8%	7.0%	4.0%	3.7%	–	71.3%
Afis	7 April 2014	21.0%	23.0%	5.1%	3.5%	2.9%	5.7%	1.8%	4.4%	–	67.4%
Ekzakta	10 April 2014	22.5%	18.9%	6.0%	–	5.2%	5.3%	3.4%	5.0%	–	66.3%
Institute for Modern Politics	12 April 2014	21.8%	21.0%	5.1%	4.1%	2.7%	7.3%	1.2%	3.1%	1.7%	68.0%
Source	Date	GERB	BSP	DPS	Attack	Reformist Bloc	BBT	NFSB	ABV	Others	Total

=== Election campaign ===
Source	Date	GERB	BSP	DPS	Attack	Reformist Bloc	BBT	NFSB	ABV	Others	Total
Institute for Modern Politics	26 April 2014	17.6%	15.9%	6.2%	2.5%	4.5%	4.9%	3.0%	4.5%	7.0%	66.1%
Sova Haris	28 April 2014	17.0%	19.2%	6.2%	2.3%	4.1%	5.5%	1.4%	2.3%	0.3%	58.3%
Center for Analysis and Marketing	30 April 2014	14.8%	13.3%	6.8%	1.7%	3.0%	2.7%	2.1%	0.7%	–	45.1%
Mediana	13 May 2014	17.1%	20.5%	7.3%	3.5%	4.3%	9.8%	3.6%	2.9%	–	69.0%
Institute for Modern Politics	13 May 2014	19.3%	20.5%	7.0%	4.5%	2.5%	7.5%	1.4%	3.5%	2.6%	68.8%
Exacta Research	19 May 2014	28.5%	24.0%	11.3%	4.1%	6.2%	11.1%	3.8%	5.8%	–	94.8%
Alpha Research	20 May 2014	27.3%	23.6%	13.4%	4.1%	5.9%	10.5%	3.9%	5.3%	–	94.0%
Source	Date	GERB	BSP	DPS	Attack	Reformist Bloc	BBT	NFSB	ABV	Others	Total

=== Exit polls ===
Source	Date	GERB	BSP	DPS	Attack	Reformist Bloc	BBT	NFSB	ABV	Others	Total
Mediana	25 May 2014	27.9%	20.2%	14.5%	–	7.3%	11.6%	–	–	–	81.5%
Alpha Research	25 May 2014	28.4%	21.6%	15.5%	–	6.8%	9.9%	–	–	–	82.2%
Gallup International	25 May 2014	28.6%	19.8%	14.9%	–	6.4%	11.1%	–	–	–	80.8%

== Results ==
Party	Votes	%	Seats	+/–
GERB	680,838	30.40	6	+1
Coalition for Bulgaria	424,037	18.94	4	0
Movement for Rights and Freedoms	386,725	17.27	4	+1
Bulgaria Uncensored	238,629	10.66	2	New
Reformist Bloc	144,532	6.45	1	0
Alternative for Bulgarian Revival	90,061	4.02	0	New
National Front for the Salvation of Bulgaria	68,376	3.05	0	New
Attack	66,210	2.96	0	–2
People's Voice	22,440	1.00	0	New
Coalition KOD (OB–NDSV–SDP)	20,487	0.91	0	–2
The Greens	12,547	0.56	0	0
Bulgarian Left	11,014	0.49	0	New
Blue Unity	10,786	0.48	0	New
Bulgarian Communist Party	9,318	0.42	0	New
Green Party	7,989	0.36	0	New
BASTA	7,330	0.33	0	New
Party of Greens	5,218	0.23	0	New
Union of Communists in Bulgaria	3,217	0.14	0	New
Bulgarian National-Patriotic Party	3,000	0.13	0	New
Christian Democratic Party	2,964	0.13	0	New
Nationalist Parties of Bulgaria (Svoboda–Libertas Bulgaria)	2,499	0.11	0	New
Independents	21,213	0.95	0	0
Total	2,239,430	100.00	17	0
Valid votes	2,239,430	94.81		
Invalid/blank votes	122,536	5.19		
Total votes	2,361,966	100.00		
Registered voters/turnout	6,599,599	35.79		
Source: CIK

== Elected MEPs ==
The following 17 MEP were elected:

European People's Party–European Democrats – 7 seats:

- GERB – 6 seats
  - Tomislav Donchev (former Minister of European Funding management)
  - Andrey Kovatchev (second term as MEP)
  - Maria Gabriel (second term as MEP)
  - Vladimir Uruchev (third term as MEP)
  - Eva Paunova
  - Emil Radev
- RB Reformist Bloc – 1 seat
  - Svetoslav Malinov (second term as MEP) (according to preliminary info a majority of the voters have expressed their preference for the second candidate in the list – Malinov. Confirmed by the Central Electoral Commission)

Party of European Socialists – 4 seats:

- BSP Bulgarian Socialist Party – 4 seats
  - Momchil Nekov (Candidate No. 15 on the party list, but finished in first place after a surprising preference voting victory)
  - Sergei Stanishev
  - Iliana Yotova (third term as MEP)
  - Georgi Pirinski

Alliance of Liberals and Democrats for Europe – 4 seats:

- DPS Movement for Rights and Freedoms – 4 seats:
  - Filiz Husmenova (third term as MEP)
  - Nedjmi Ali
  - Ilhan Kyuchuk
  - Iskra Mihaylova (incumbent Minister of Environment and Water Resources, instead of Delyan Peevski)

Declined:

- Delyan Peevski (steps down, turns over his seat to the fifth on the list)

European Conservatives and Reformists – 2 seats

- BBT Bulgaria Without Censorship (Electoral Alliance) – 2 seats
  - Nikolay Barekov (Bulgaria Without Censorship)
  - Angel Dzhambazki (IMRO – Bulgarian National Movement)

== Media expenses ==
According to a survey taken by the NGO Institute for Public Environment Development, the following table represents the media campaign expenses of the main parties:

Party	Spending (BGN)	Spending per seat
Bulgaria Without Censorship	1,085,655	542,827.50
Bulgarian Socialist Party	740,000	185,000
Attack	648,000	Did not win any seats
Reformist Bloc	360,000	360,000
Movement for Rights and Freedoms	294,500	73,625
Alternative for Bulgarian Revival	229,318	Did not win any seats
GERB	133,271	22,211.80

- Note: Campaign expenses were capped at BGN 2 million.

== See also ==
- 2007 European Parliament election in Bulgaria
- 2009 European Parliament election in Bulgaria
- 2014 European Parliament election
- European Parliament elections, Bulgaria
