= European Conservatives, Patriots & Affiliates =

Political group in the Parliamentary Assembly of the Council of Europe

The European Conservatives, Patriots & Affiliates (ECPA) group is a conservative group in the Parliamentary Assembly of the Council of Europe. It was founded as the Group of Independent Representatives in 1970 by British and Scandinavian members of PACE. It has 76 members from countries including the United Kingdom, Austria, Norway, Denmark, Poland, Sweden and Italy. It was known as the European Democrat Group until its renaming in 2014, the European Conservatives Group until 2019, and the European Conservatives Group and Democratic Alliance (EC/DA) until 2025.

While it was only the third group to be founded in PACE (after the Socialist Group and the Christian Democrat Group), it was the first to have an official secretariat, which was established in 1977. On 6 July 1978, a proposal to rename the group was submitted, leading to the new name in September 1980.

The Group gathers mainly members from the European Conservatives and Reformists Party, Patriots.eu and Europe of Sovereign Nations (party).

For many years the Russian political party United Russia was a member of the European Democrat Group.

== Membership ==
=== 2026 ===
As of October 2026, The European Conservatives, Patriots & Affiliates has the following members:

Country	Party name	Members	Other affiliations		
Country	Party name	Members	European party	EU Parliament	International
Armenia	Strong Armenia	2	None	N/A	None
Austria	FPÖ	3	Patriots.eu	Patriots for Europe	None
Belgium	Vlaams Belang	2	Patriots.eu	Patriots for Europe	None
Bulgaria	Movement for Rights and Freedoms - MRF	2	ECR Party	ECR	None
Czechia	ANO 2011	3	Patriots.eu	Patriots for Europe	None
Czechia	Civic Democratic Party	2	ECR Party	ECR	IDU
Czechia	Motorists for Themselves	1	Patriots.eu	Patriots for Europe	None
Denmark	Danish People's Party	2	Patriots.eu	Patriots for Europe	None
Estonia	Conservative People's Party	1	Patriots.eu	Patriots for Europe	None
Finland	Finns Party	3	ECR Party	ECR	None
France	Rassemblement National	6	Patriots.eu	Patriots for Europe	None
Germany	AfD	8	Europe of Sovereign Nations Party	ESN	None
Hungary	Fidesz	2	Patriots.eu	Patriots for Europe	CDI
Hungary	KDNP	1	None	Patriots for Europe	CDI
Iceland	Centre Party	2	None	N/A	None
Italy	FdI	10	ECR Party	ECR	IDU
Italy	LSP	6	Patriots.eu	Patriots for Europe	None
Latvia	National Alliance "All For Latvia!"–"For Fatherland and Freedom/LNNK"	1	ECR Party	ECR	IDU
Liechtenstein	Democrats for Liechtenstein	1	None	N/A	None
Luxembourg	Parti de réforme alternatif et démocratique (ADR)	1	ECR Party	Non-Inscrits	None
Netherlands	Party for Freedom	2	Patriots.eu	Patriots for Europe	None
Norway	Progress Party	3	None	N/A	None
Poland	Confederation	1	Patriots.eu	Patriots for Europe	None
Poland	Development Plus	2	None	ECR	None
Poland	PiS	6	ECR Party	ECR	None
Portugal	Chega	4	Patriots.eu	Patriots for Europe	None
Romania	Alliance for the Unity of Romanians	3	ECR Party	ECR	None
Romania	Young People's Party	2	None	None	None
Serbia	NEW DSS - POKS (NADA)	2	None	N/A	None
Slovakia	Sloboda a Solidarita	1	None	None	None
Slovakia	SNS - Slovenská národná strana	2	ECR Party	None	None
Spain	VOX	1	Patriots.eu	Patriots for Europe	Madrid Forum
Sweden	Sweden Democrats	4	ECR Party	ECR	None
Ukraine	European Solidarity	1	EPP	N/A	IDU
Ukraine	For the Future	2	None	N/A	None
Ukraine	Servant of the People	4	ALDE Party	N/A	None
Ukraine	Trust	1	None	N/A	None
United Kingdom	Conservative	7	None	N/A	IDU

=== 2022 ===
As of October 2022, the European Conservatives Group and Democratic Alliance has the following members:

Country	Party name	Members	Other affiliations		
Country	Party name	Members	European party	EU Parliament	International
Armenia	Republican Party of Armenia	1	EPP	N/A	None
Austria	Freedom Party of Austria	2	ID Party	Patriots for Europe	None
Azerbaijan	New Azerbaijan Party	4	None	N/A	CDI
Azerbaijan	Republican Alternative Party	1	None	N/A	None
Azerbaijan	Democratic Reforms Party	1	None	N/A	None
Azerbaijan	Independents	3	N/A	N/A	N/A
Belgium	Vlaams Belang	2	ID Party	Patriots for Europe	None
Croatia	Bridge of Independent Lists	1	None	None	None
Croatia	Homeland Movement	1	None	None	None
Czech Republic	Civic Democratic Party	3	ECR Party	ECR	IDU
Denmark	Danish People's Party	1	None	Patriots for Europe	None
Estonia	Conservative People's Party of Estonia	1	ID Party	None	None
Finland	Finns Party	2	None	ECR	None
France	National Rally	4	ID Party	Patriots for Europe	None
Germany	Alternative for Germany	4	None	Europe of Sovereign Nations	None
Greece	Greek Solution	1	None	ECR	None
Hungary	Fidesz	8	None	Patriots for Europe	CDI
Italy	Brothers of Italy	2	ECR Party	ECR	IDU
Italy	Lega per Salvini Premier	7	ID Party	Patriots for Europe	None
Italy	Independent	1	N/A	N/A	N/A
Lithuania	Electoral Action of Poles in Lithuania – Christian Families Alliance	1	ECR Party	ECR	None
Moldova	Șor Party	1	ECR	N/A	None
Netherlands	JA21	1	ECR Party	ECR	None
Norway	Progress Party	1	None	N/A	None
Poland	Law and Justice	12	ECR Party	ECR	None
Romania	Alliance for the Union of Romanians	2	None	ECR	None
Serbia	Movement for the Restoration of the Kingdom of Serbia	1	None	None	None
Slovakia	Freedom and Solidarity	1	ECR Party	ECR	None
Spain	Vox	1	ECR Party	Patriots for Europe	None
Sweden	Sweden Democrats	2	ECR Party	ECR	None
Ukraine	Servant of the People	5	ALDE Party	N/A	None
Ukraine	For the Future	1	None	N/A	None
Ukraine	European Solidarity	1	EPP	N/A	IDU
United Kingdom	Conservative Party	20	None	N/A	IDU
United Kingdom	Democratic Unionist Party	1	None	N/A	None
United Kingdom	Crossbench	1	N/A	N/A	N/A

=== 2014 ===
As of 23 October 2014, the European Conservatives had the following members:

Country	Party name	Members	Other affiliations		
Country	Party name	Members	European party	EU Parliament	International
Armenia	Prosperous Armenia	2	AECR	N/A	None
Armenia	Republican Party of Armenia (part)^{[A]}	1	None	N/A	None
Azerbaijan	New Azerbaijan Party	4	None	N/A	None
Czech Republic	Civic Democratic Party	2	AECR	ECR	IDU
Denmark	Danish People's Party	1	None	ECR	None
Greece	Independent Greeks	1	None	ECR	None
Iceland	Independence Party	2	AECR	N/A	IDU
Norway	Progress Party	2	None	N/A	None
Poland	Law and Justice	7	AECR	ECR	None
Poland	United Poland	1	MELD	No MEPs	None
Turkey	Justice and Development Party (part)^{[B]}	13	AECR	N/A	None
Turkey	Nationalist Movement Party^{[C]}	1	None	N/A	None
Ukraine	Party of Regions (part)^{[D]}	4	None	N/A	None
Ukraine	Sovereign European Ukraine	1	None	N/A	None
United Kingdom	Conservative Party	17	AECR	ECR	IDU
United Kingdom	Democratic Unionist Party	1	None	NI	None
^A One of the three members of the Republican Party of Armenia sit with the EC Group. The other two members sit with the European People's Party.^B Eleven of the thirteen members of the Justice and Development Party sit with the EC Group. One sits with the European People's Party and one sits with the Alliance of Liberals and Democrats for Europe.^C One of the two members of the Nationalist Movement Party sits with the EC Group.^D Four of the seven members of Party of Regions sit with the EC Group. Two sit with the Socialist Group and one sits with the Alliance of Liberals and Democrats for Europe.

Unaffiliated members: Ganira Pashayeva, Yuliya Lyovochkina

== See also ==
- European Democrats
