= Reload Bulgaria =

Bulgaria Awake Будна България
- Leader: Nikolay Barekov
- Founded: 25 January 2014 as Bulgaria Without Censorship
- Headquarters: Cherni Vrah Blvd, Sofia, Bulgaria
- Ideology: Right-wing populism National conservatism Bulgarian nationalism Anti-corruption; Euroscepticism
- Political position: Centre-right (self-declared)
- European affiliation: Alliance of Conservatives and Reformists in Europe (until 2019)
- European Parliament group: European Conservatives and Reformists
- Colours: White, Green, Red
- National Assembly: 0 / 240
- European Parliament: 0 / 17

Website
- prezaredibg.com

Bulgaria Awake (Bulgarian: Презареди България, romanized: Prezaredi Balgariya; formerly known as Reload Bulgaria (Bulgarian: Презареди България, romanized: Prezaredi Balgariya, and Bulgaria Uncensored, Bulgarian: България без цензура) is a populist political party in Bulgaria.

== History ==
The party was founded by former TV host Nikolay Barekov in January 2014. It ran for the first time in the May 2014 European Parliament election, taking one seat in the European Parliament as part of a coalition with VMRO and joined the soft eurosceptic group of European Conservatives and Reformists.

The BWC-VMRO coalition did not last, however, and VMRO left to team up with other nationalist parties for the parliamentary elections of October 2014. On 18 August 2014, BWC sealed a coalition agreement with LIDER to run in the upcoming elections.

The party made contradicting comments on the form of government. In June 2014, Barekov declared his support for the restoration of the Bulgarian Monarchy and Simeon II as Tsar of Bulgaria. He vowed that should his party win a general election, he would introduce referendums on a number of issues, including the restoration of the monarchy. On other occasions he called for a people's republic.

Despite holding 15 seats in the Assembly, Reload Bulgaria chose not to compete in the 2017 parliamentary elections after being initially refused a name change, among other reasons. The party participated in the 2019 EU parliamentary elections, losing two seats.

In 2022, the party was renamed to Bulgaria Awake. The party has not contested an election since 2019, however, its nominal leader, Nikolay Barekov, participated in the October 2024 Bulgarian parliamentary election as the list leader for the APS in Vratsa.

== Election results ==
=== National Assembly ===
Election	Votes	%	Seats	Rank
2014	186,938	5.69%	15 / 240	6th

=== European Parliament ===
Election	Votes	%	Seats	Rank
2014	238,629	10.66%	2 / 17	4th
2019	3,907	0.19%	0 / 17	18th
