= National Youth Committee of VMRO =

- Formation: 2001
- Type: Youth organization
- Headquarters: Troyan, Bulgaria
- President: Hristo Ivanov
- Website: vmro.bg/category/natsionalen-mladezhki-komitet/

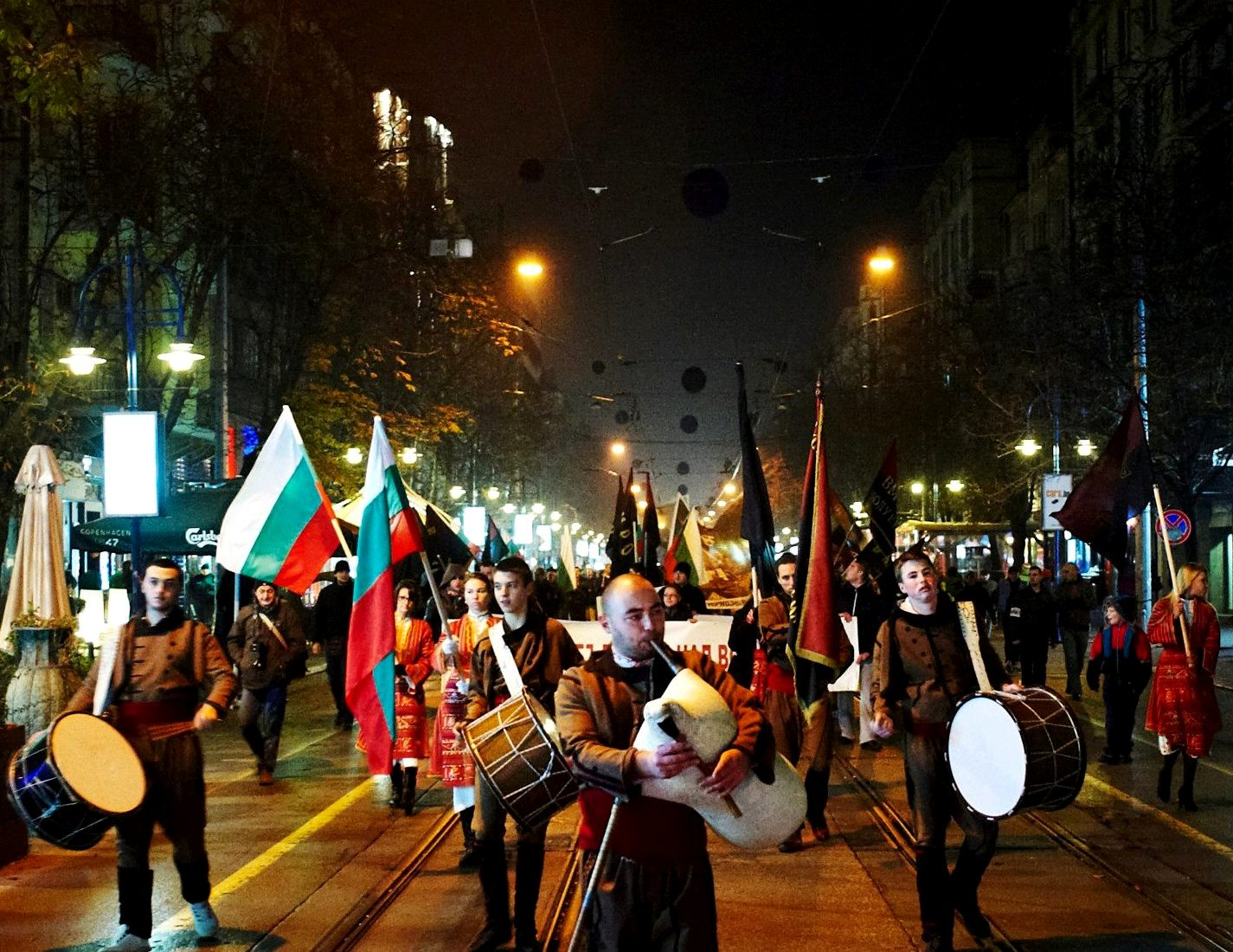
Scene from the annual procession, called "Bulgarian March", organised by the National Youth Committee of VMRO

The National Youth Committee of VMRO (Bulgarian: Национален младежки комитет на ВМРО) is the official national youth organization of the Bulgarian nationalist VMRO political party.

The committee was established in the autumn of 2001 in the city of Troyan in order for all the youth organizations in the country to be united. Since 2004, it is the official youth organization of the party.
