= Nikolay Barekov =

Bulgarian journalist and politician

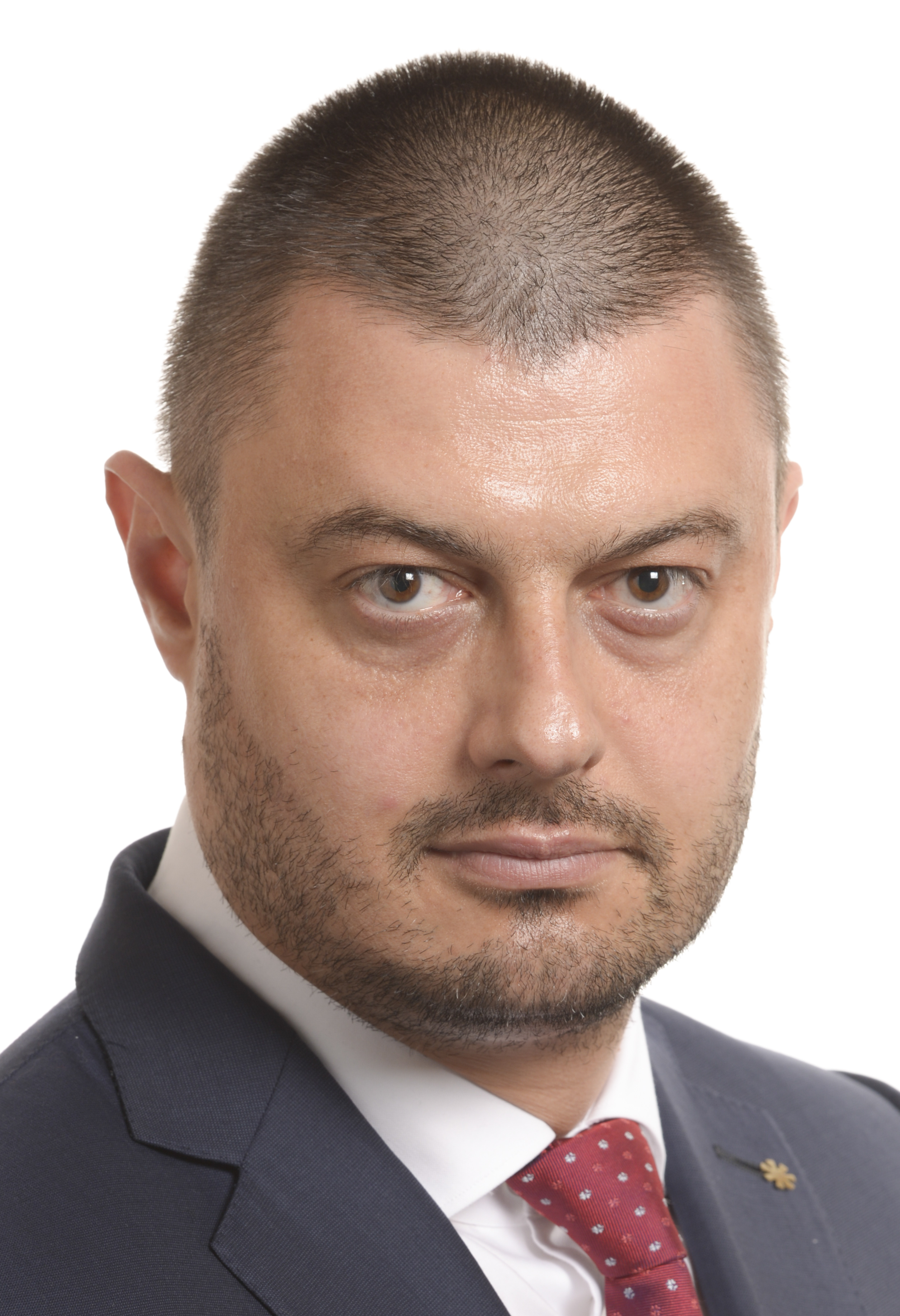

Member of the European Parliament for Bulgaria
- In office 1 July 2014 – 1 July 2019

Personal details
- Born: 16 October 1972 (age 53) Plovdiv, Bulgaria
- Party: Reload Bulgaria (2017–present)
- Children: 5 (including Nikolay Barekov Jr., Alex Barekov, Viktor Barekov)
- Parent(s): Tihomirov Barekov and Magdalena Barekova
- Relatives: Despa Barekova (sister)

Nikolay Tihomirov Barekov (Bulgarian: Николай Тихомиров Бареков; born 16 October 1972) is a Bulgarian journalist, politician, and businessman. Since January 2014 he has been the leader of the political party Bulgaria Without Censorship.

== Biography ==
Barekov majored in Bulgarian philology, specializing in TV journalism. His career as a radio journalist began in 1992, when he joined the "Kanal Kom" (Bulgarian: "Канал Ком") radio in Plovdiv.

Between 2003 and 2010, Barekov presented the morning segment on the BTV channel. He subsequently hosted a number of shows on TV7.

On 25 January 2014, Barekov founded the Bulgaria without Censorship political party and the new political establishment participated in the 2014 European elections as part of a coalition bloc with the nationalist IMRO and other smaller parties, earning two seats in the European Parliament and became members of the eurosceptic group of European Conservatives and Reformists. He is consistently ranked as an MEP with one of the lowest attendance rates in roll-call votes. He refused to give a reason for his absence when asked by Euronews.

Barekov supports the restoration of the monarchy with Simeon Saxe-Coburg-Gotha as Tsar of Bulgaria.
