= European Conservatives and Reformists =

European Conservatives and Reformists may refer to:

- European Conservatives and Reformists Party (ECR Party), a soft Eurosceptic European political party
- European Conservatives and Reformists Group (ECR Group), a soft Eurosceptic political group of the European Parliament
