= Tomasz Poręba =

Polish politician (born 1973)

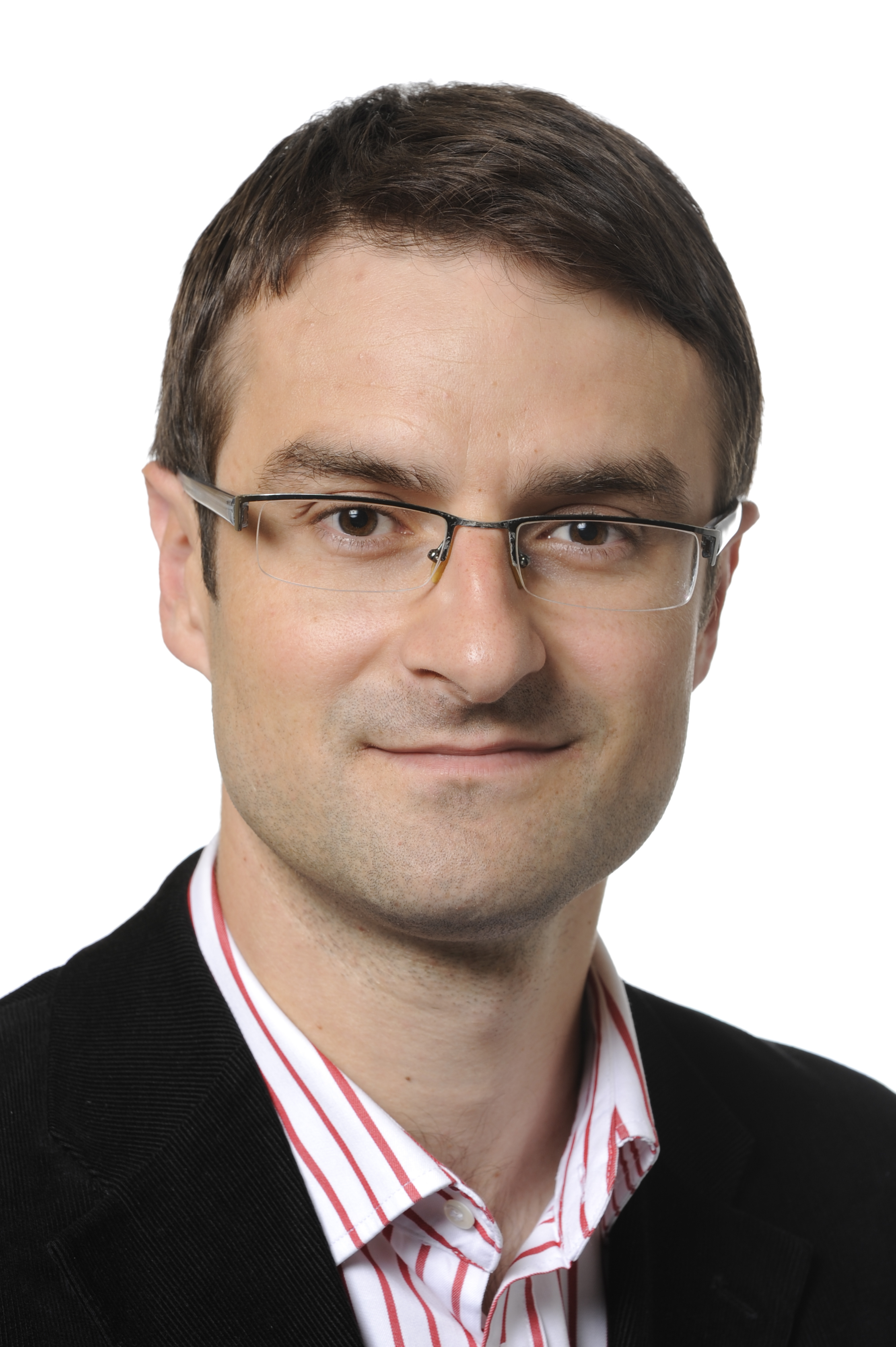

Member of the European Parliament
- In office 2009–2024
- Constituency: Subcarpathian

Personal details
- Born: Tomasz Piotr Poręba; 31 March 1973 (age 53) Grybów, Poland
- Party: Law and Justice

Tomasz Piotr Poręba (born 31 March 1973) is a Polish politician, civil servant, journalist, historian and political scientist. He was a Member of the European Parliament in the VII, VIII and IX term from Poland,

== Early life ==
Son of Maria and Antoni, a railway worker. He majored in history and political science from the Pedagogical University of Kraków, Poland. He later continued his studies in journalism. He then graduated with a postgraduate degree in European studies from the University of Warsaw and Maastricht University. During his studies in Poland, he professionally played football as striker in III league Kraków’s clubs – Kabel Kraków, Karpaty Siepraw, Górnik Wieliczka. His sports career was ended following an injury. He also worked as sport journalist in Gazeta Krakowska.

In the late 1990s, he worked in the Chancellery of the Prime Minister, then in the Institute of National Remembrance (IPN) in Warsaw. In 2003 he joined the Law and Justice Party, where he worked as the Head of Information and Public Relations Department. As of 2004 he worked in the European Parliament in Brussels as Senior Advisor of the political group Union for Europe of the Nations in the Committee on Regional Development and then in the Committee on Foreign Affairs. He was the spokesperson for Law and Justice Members in the European Parliament.

== Career ==
In 2009 he was elected as a Member of the European Parliament from Podkarpackie Voivodeship. He was the vice-chair of the Delegation of Law and Justice (PiS) in the European Parliament and a member of the Presidium of the European Conservatives and Reformists. In 2011 he became a leader of Law and Justice Election Committee for the national parliament. In November 2011 he was elected by the Law and Justice Political Council to become member of the Political Committee, the decision making body of the party.

In 2014 he was re-elected with 113 704 votes as a Member of the European Parliament for the Law and Justice Party for Podkarpackie Voivodeship, he gained one of the best election results in Poland. He was a vice-chair of the Committee of Transport and Tourism in the European Parliament and vice-chair of Law and Justice Delegation in the EP.

In 2014 Tomasz Poręba became the president of a conservative European think tank New Direction.

In 2018 he again became a leader of the Election Committee of Law and Justice for the successful local government elections and also led the Law and Justice campaign for elections to the European Parliament in 2019, in which he was re-elected as Member of the European Parliament from the list of Law and Justice from Podkarpackie Voivodeship for his third term. He received 276 014 votes and it was best individual result in these elections in Poland (37% of votes cast in the constituency).

In December 2018 Tomasz Poręba became a Vice-President of the Polish Olympic Committee.

In April 2024, he announced he would not be running in the next elections to the European Parliament. The European Parliament lifted his immunity in November 2023 regarding a lawsuit against him by Rafał Gaweł officially sentenced in Poland for two years in prison and wanted on an arrest warrant, who accused him and other PiS members of disseminating racist content.

== Private life ==
He is married and has two daughters.
