= IMRO – Bulgarian National Movement =

Bulgarian political party

IMRO – Bulgarian National Movement ВМРО – Българско национално движение
- Abbreviation: IMRO–BND
- Leader: Krasimir Karakachanov
- Founded: 1990
- Headquarters: 5 Pirotska Street; Sofia, Bulgaria
- Newspaper: Bulgaria
- Youth wing: National Youth Committee
- Membership (2016): ~20,000
- Ideology: National conservatism; Bulgarian nationalism; Social conservatism; Right-wing populism; Soft Euroscepticism
- Political position: Far-right
- Religion: Bulgarian Orthodox Church
- National affiliation: Progressive Bulgaria
- European affiliation: European Conservatives and Reformists Party (until 2026)
- Colours: Red; Black
- National Assembly: 0 / 240 (0%)
- European Parliament: 0 / 17 (0%)
- Municipalities: 7 / 265
- Sofia City Council: 1 / 61

Party flag

Website
- vmro.bg

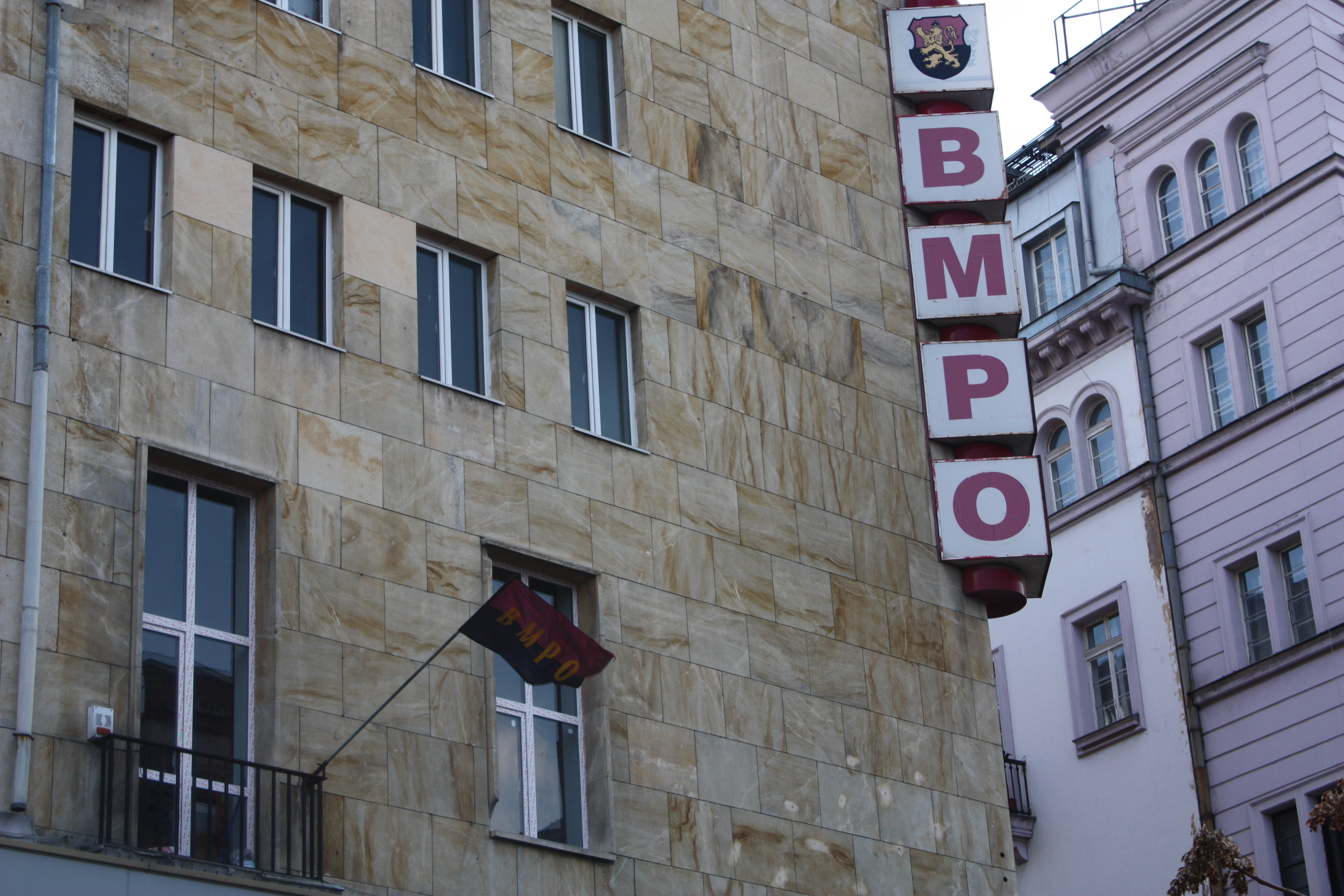
VMRO-BND's headquarters in Sofia

IMRO – Bulgarian National Movement (IMRO–BNM, Bulgarian: ВМРО – Българско Национално Движение, romanized: VMRO – Balgarsko Natsionalno Dvizhenie, VMRO–BND) is a far-right, nationalist, and right-wing populist political party in Bulgaria. The party espouses anti-Romani, anti-Muslim and anti-immigration stances.

== History ==
The IMRO acronym is derived from the Internal Macedonian Revolutionary Organization (IMRO), a historic Bulgarian-led revolutionary political organization in the Macedonia and Thrace regions of the Ottoman Empire, which the party claims as its predecessor, like its counterpart in North Macedonia - VMRO-DPMNE. The appendage "BND" stands for "Bulgarian National Movement".

At the time of its founding in 1990, it was a nationalist cultural organization named VMRO-Union of Macedonian Associations (VMRO-SMD). Despite not being a political party, VMRO‐SMD gained two parliamentary seats in 1994 and 1997 by participating in the coalition of the Union of Democratic Forces, the main center‐right party in Bulgaria at the time. At the fourth congress in 1997, VMRO-SMD dropped SMD from its name. It published pamphlets denying the legitimacy of a separate Macedonian nation, while also advocating for the Bulgarian character of Macedonia. In 1997, the organization elected Krasimir Karakachanov as its president, who in 1999 transformed the organization into a political party. The decision to transform the cultural organization into a political party led to a significant portion of members leaving in disagreement. The members who left established a new cultural organization called VMRO–Union of Macedonian Organizations (VMRO-SMO). In the 1999 local elections, the party gained 5.9 percent votes, appointing five mayors. In 2000 another VMRO splinter organization was established, claiming to be the descendant of the historic IMRO. Karakachanov accused both organizations of trying to steal the party's properties.

In 2001, the Sofia youth organization of the party criticized Karakachanov during the party congress, arguing that the party had lost its direction and accused Karakachanov of using the party for personal gain. It gradually transformed into a right-wing populist party in the 2000s under Karakachanov's leadership. VMRO-BND's rhetoric was less explicitly nationalist in the early years of Bulgaria's transition to democracy but became more nationalistic in the 2000s. In 2001, the party participated in the parliamentary elections in a coalition with George's Day Movement, and gained 3.6 percent of the vote. In 2004, it added "Bulgarian National Movement" to its name. On the eve of the June 2005 parliamentary elections, the party joined the coalition Bulgarian People's Union. In the 2005 elections, the party gained 5.2 percent of the vote and had six out of the coalition's 13 MPs.

VMRO-BND initiated a campaign of "No to Votes from Turkey for Bulgarian Members of the European Parliament" to prevent Bulgarian emigrants in Turkey from participating in the European Parliament (EP) elections in 2007. VMRO-BND suggested the law on the election of MEPs to be revised to disallow Bulgarian citizens who have lived in Bulgaria or countries of the European Union for less than six months before the date of an election from voting, while also making voting mandatory. In the 2009 EP elections, VMRO-BND participated in the coalition "Forward", along with the Agrarian People's Union, the George's Day Movement, and the Ensembled People's Party.

In the past, VMRO‐BND was also involved in the organization of the Lukov March, a neo‐Nazi torch rally held each February in honor of Hristo Lukov, a Bulgarian general and Nazi collaborationist. Leaders of the party expressed their support for the Lukov March and denied its relation to neo-Nazi propaganda. However, the party has distanced itself from that event. In 2013, VMRO‐BND placed two independent nationalists from Sandanski on its electoral lists to release them after their arrest for bombing the local party office of Euroroma, a Romani political party, as electoral candidates had immunity from judicial prosecution then. In the 2013 elections, the party received 1.9 percent of the vote. For the 2014 elections, VMRO-BND founded the coalition Patriotic Front (PF). It won 7.3 percent vote and eight seats out of PF's 19. In the 2014 EP elections, the party, in coalition with the centrist conservative party, Bulgaria Without Censorship, won two seats in EP, including one for Angel Dzhambazki. In 2014, it also created a party‐affiliated television channel, Bulgaria 24. In 2016 and 2017, it participated in an electoral coalition called "United Patriots", becoming a member of the government. In 2017, Karakachanov was appointed as Deputy Prime Minister for national security and Minister of Defense.

In its 2019 campaign, it actively opposed the liberal model of multiculturalism, Islamization, and illegal migration. The slogan of the 2019 electoral campaign, "We Defend Bulgaria", expressed the position of the party that the country was threatened by illegal immigrants, LGBTQ groups, multiculturalism and "gender ideology". The party claimed that enemy external forces were threatening to destroy the country with the usage of multiculturalism and foreign cultural ideas and practices. It also claimed that Bulgarians were being treated by other EU countries as second-class citizens. VMRO-BND claimed that the so-called "Macron package" limited the rights of Bulgarian transport companies to provide services in other EU countries and served the interests of the bigger countries and their transport companies. VMRO-BND campaigned for limiting social security support for unemployed Romani people and proposed public measures to stimulate Romani women to seek abortion and to severely penalize criminal acts committed by Romani people. Part of the campaign also promoted the destruction of several Romani neighbourhoods in different cities to demonstrate the power of the law to people who do not have legal documents for their property. As a result, the party received 7.36 percent votes and was supported by more than 140,000 voters. VMRO-BND also sent two MEPs to EP.

In its 2020 program, it included a section on green politics, declaring support for "green nationalism," defined as "the idea that without nature, there is no Bulgaria". VMRO‐BND has regularly organized the clean‐up and restoration of local areas, such as parks or playgrounds, under the banner of its campaign "Green is love of your country." Ahead of the second 2021 parliamentary election, Volya formed an electoral alliance with the National Front for the Salvation of Bulgaria and VMRO-BND called Bulgarian Patriots.

The party announced that it would not be participating in the 2023 parliamentary election, expecting that the election would yield a similar result to the ones before and accused the other parties of driving Bulgaria into an economic and political crisis. Instead, VMRO-BND called on its supporters to boycott the vote.

On 17 February 2024, Karakachanov was re-elected as party chairman by an extraordinary congress, overcoming an attempt by Dzhambazki to take the helm. In the combined parliamentary election on 9 June 2024, VMRO-BND received just under one percent of the vote for National Assembly and just over two percent for European Parliament. In August 2024, a number of party members and activists publicly rebelled against Karakachanov, denouncing him as a pro-Putin leader who is leading the party astray, and formed "The Ivan Mihailov Circle", named after the IMRO leader, to generate and discuss ideas on how to put the party back on track.

During the 2026 Bulgarian parliamentary election, one VMRO member was elected on the list of Progressive Bulgaria.

== Ideology ==
=== Identity ===
It is known as a strongly nationalist and populist party. It has an extreme pro-Orthodox stance. It had oriented itself towards a Greater Bulgaria. It rejects the existence of a Macedonian ethnicity separate from the Bulgarian one. The party claims it would like to include all ethnic Bulgarians in a single state by peaceful means, since the Treaty of Berlin in 1878 left millions of compatriots outside Bulgaria. VMRO-BND thinks the state should protect Bulgarian culture, tradition and the Bulgarian heritage. It has supported introducing religion in Bulgarian schools. The party has demanded a new constitution that increases the powers of the Bulgarian president and the declaration of Orthodox Christianity as the official state religion. VMRO-BND also encourages marriage and increased birth rates for ethnic Bulgarians and the settlement of people of Bulgarian descent from abroad.

The party is situated on the far-right in the political spectrum. VMRO-BND claims to follow an ideology of "contemporary Bulgarian nationalism". It describes itself as a conservative and patriotic party based on modern nationalism. In its party documents, it has listed aims such as to "preserve and develop traditional Bulgarian values, rites, and beliefs for the future generations" and to achieve "the spiritual unity of the Bulgarian people in Moesia, Thrace, Macedonia, the Western Outlands, and all other Bulgarian communities abroad." The party promotes the creation of a strong military and police, repressive law enforcement, and granting subsidies to families with many children, on the condition that both parents have secondary education. It is associated with the Macedonian Scientific Institute and the National Conservative Forum, a non-partisan group promoting national and conservative ideas.

=== Economic policy ===
VMRO-BND had promoted the introduction of a flat tax, reduction of redistribution of GDP from 40 percent to 30 percent, establishment of scholarships for all students with a progressive funding scale dependent on their success, reduction of state intervention in social relations. The party also wanted to make Bulgaria a regional logistic and energy hub, impose a 10 percent tax rate on profits for companies producing software and hardware, as well as companies whose capital is in Bulgaria and whose profit is reinvested in the national economy. However, VMRO‐BND has changed its economic views and its program has become more protectionist, with the aim of "supporting... the Bulgarian entrepreneurship against the challenges of the European and world markets."

=== Social issues ===
VMRO-BND is staunchly socially conservative and adamantly opposes same-sex marriage, even going as far as to propose additional amendments to Bulgaria's constitution to preemptively block any gay marriage law from being passed in the future. VMRO-BND denounces all forms of public manifestation of LGBTQ rights.

During the 2020–2021 Bulgarian protests, Karakachanov expressed the opinion that the protests were organized by "a few Sorosoidite NGOs and extra-parliamentary political parties" to seize power, claiming that the goal of the protests, in his view, was to "bring gay marriage" and "create a gender republic", which he disagreed with.

It also proposed constitutional amendments that would ban people without a minimal amount of education from voting in elections or referendums, as well as amendments that would bring back mandatory conscription for all males. VMRO-BND has strongly opposed the Istanbul Convention, with the Bulgarian Orthodox Party siding with the party after having initially supported the treaty. VMRO-BND's representatives have emphasized the image of a traditional family as consisting of a man, a woman and children (boys and girls), based on traditional Bulgarian and Christian values. They oppose liberal values, such as multiculturalism and "gender ideology", defined as "a policy against nature". It supports the death penalty.

=== Minorities ===
In January 2001, the party protested against the government's plans to give agricultural land to poor Romani people. In January 2002, it called on the Bulgarian inhabitants not to pay their electricity bills if the state-owned Plovdiv Electricity Company did not collect bills from Stolipinovo, a predominantly Romani neighborhood in Plovdiv, and threatened to organize public protests. VMRO-BND supported electricity cuts in Stolipinovo, claiming that Romani people regarded themselves as privileged for not paying for consumption. The party threatened it would sue any politician or official who ordered electricity provision to be restored in Stolipinovo. Its goals include opposing "Islamic fundamentalism" and the "Turkification" of Bulgarian Muslims.

VMRO‐BND has been one of the main organizers of local action against ethnic and religious minorities, particularly the Turkish and Romani people, whose protests have often resulted in violence. VMRO-BND expresses an antiziganist worldview, proposing a "solution to the problem of unsocialized gypsy groups" in 2019, which included a destruction of Romani ghettoes, penal labour, restriction of social benefits and limiting births of underage Romani. It uses a nationalist ideology based on anti-Romani, anti-Turkish, anti-immigrant and anti-Islamic rhetoric. Minorities, foreigners and Islam are depicted as threatening Bulgaria.

It opposes minority rights (especially for Turkish and Romani people) and rights for all religious denominations except for the Bulgarian Orthodox Church. Locally, the party's leaders and activists have openly engaged, often together with Orthodox priests, aggressively against non-traditional religious groups, protesting against their activities, forcefully interrupting their gatherings, and banishing them from cities. Leaders of ethnic and religious minorities have described the party as "pro-Nazi". VMRO-BND regards the integration of Romani people, refugees and immigrants as a major national security issue. The party also perceives Turkish votes in Bulgarian elections as a security issue.

The party promotes a local version of the Great Replacement conspiracy theory, claiming that by 2050 ethnic Bulgarians will become a minority at the expense of the Romani people. VMRO‐BND claims that all major social issues, such as declining education, rising poverty, and criminality, originate from the Romani people in Bulgaria and are tolerated by the political elites at the expense of Bulgarian citizens. The party has expanded this narrative by depicting itself as a protector of the "traditional Bulgarian family," thus projecting an image that all social minorities threaten Bulgarian society. In 2021, a Romani activist filed a lawsuit against the party due to the anti-Romani material it posted on its website. As a result, the party was fined 1,000 leva and forbidden from publishing material on its website that incites hatred against ethnic minorities by Bulgaria's Commission for Protection Against Discrimination on 26 June 2023.

=== Foreign policy ===
In 2009, it urged the Bulgarian government to reclaim the so-called "Western Outlands", territories ceded by Bulgaria with the 1919 Treaty of Neuilly. VMRO-BND supported the integration of the country into the EU and NATO, although it insisted that Bulgaria should be treated as an equal partner during the negotiation process, but it later became a Eurosceptic party. The party strongly opposed EU migration policy - quota allocation and admission of millions of non-refugees. VMRO‐BND opposes the "federalization of the EU and its transformation into a superstate". EU is regularly depicted by the party as an organization that pursues a progressive agenda to undermine the ethnic foundations of societies and states in Europe. The party regards the accession of Turkey to the European Union as "a serious threat to the existence of Bulgaria". Although the party condemned the 2022 Russian invasion of Ukraine, Karakachanov has criticized military aid to Ukraine, expressing his belief that there is no military solution to the conflict. VMRO-BND's main foreign policy priorities have been support of Bulgarians abroad, countering Islamic fundamentalism and developing contacts with the Bulgarian diaspora. The party regards North Macedonia as Bulgarian.

== Election results ==
=== National Assembly ===
Bulgarian Parliament
Election	Votes	%	Seats	+/–	Rank	Government
1997 (Note: Results of the alliance United Democratic Forces.)	2,223,714	52.3	137 / 240	▲137	1st	Coalition
2001 (Note: Results with George's Day Movement.)	165,927	3.63	0 / 240	▼137	5th	Extra-parliamentary
2005 (Note: Results of the alliance Bulgarian People's Union.)	189,268	5.19	13 / 240	▲13	7th	Opposition
2009	Barred from participation					
2013	66,803	1.89	0 / 240	0	8th	Extra-parliamentary
2014 (Note: Results of the alliance Patriotic Front.)	239,101	7.29	19 / 240	▲19	5th	Support
2017 (Note: Results of the alliance United Patriots.)	318,513	9.07	12 / 240	▼7	3rd	Coalition
Apr 2021	116,430	3.58	0 / 240	▼8	7th	Extra-parliamentary
Jul 2021 (Note: Results of the alliance Bulgarian Patriots.)	85,795	3.10	0 / 240	0	7th	Extra-parliamentary
Nov 2021	28,319	1.07	0 / 240	0	9th	Extra-parliamentary
2022	20,177	0.78	0 / 240	0	10th	Extra-parliamentary
2023	Did not participate					
Jun 2024	21,273	0.96	0 / 240	0	12th	Extra-parliamentary
Oct 2024	Did not participate					
2026 (Note: Externally supported Progressive Bulgaria.)	Did not participate					

=== European Parliament ===
Election	List leader	Votes	%	Seats	+/–	EP Group
2009 (Note: Run as part of the Forwards coalition.)	Unclear	57,931	2.25 (#9)	0 / 18	New	–
2014 (Note: Run as part of the Bulgaria Uncensored coalition.)	Nikolay Barekov	238,629	10.66 (#4)	2 / 17	▲2	ECR
2019	Angel Dzhambazki	143,830	7.14 (#4)	2 / 17	0	ECR
2024	Angel Dzhambazki	42,022	2.09 (#9)	0 / 17	▼2	–

=== President ===
Election	Candidate	First round			Second round		
Election	Candidate	Votes	%	Rank	Votes	%	Result
2026	Iliana Iotova	528,951	34.76	1st	1,093,852	57.57	1st

== See also ==
- The National Youth Committee of VMRO
