= Nicola Procaccini =

Italian politician (born 1976)

Nicola Procaccini MEP
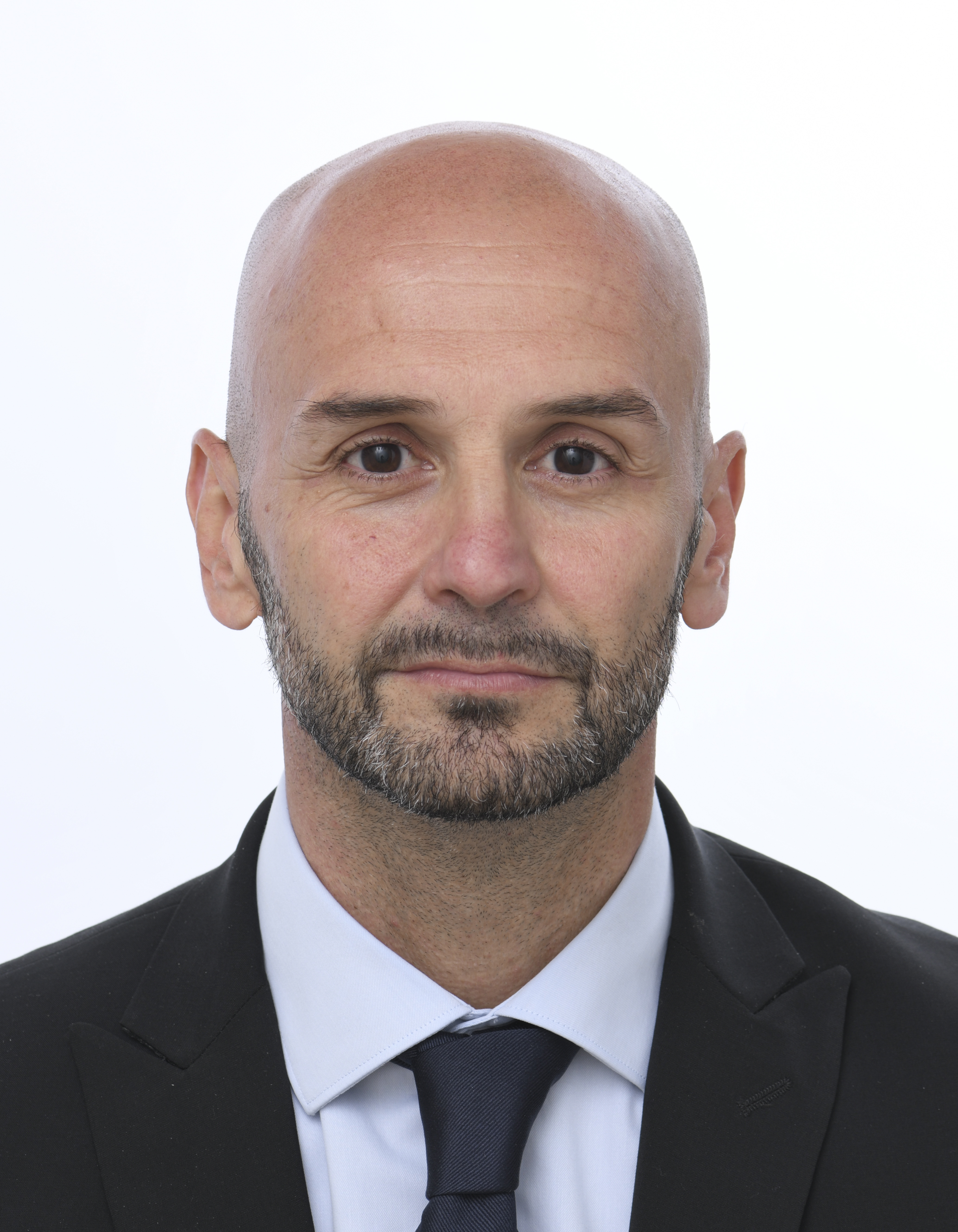
- Procaccini in 2024

Member of the European Parliament
- Incumbent
- Assumed office 2 July 2019
- Constituency: Central Italy

Mayor of Terracina
- In office 21 June 2016 – 19 July 2019
- Preceded by: Erminia Ocello
- Succeeded by: Roberta Tintari
- In office 30 May 2011 – 6 May 2015
- Preceded by: Stefano Nardi
- Succeeded by: Erminia Ocello

Personal details
- Born: 21 January 1976 (age 50) Rome, Italy
- Party: Brothers of Italy (2012–present)
- Other political affiliations: Italian Social Movement (1992–1995); National Alliance (1995–2009); The People of Freedom (2009–2012)
- Education: Sapienza University of Rome

Nicola Procaccini (born 21 January 1976) is an Italian politician who has served as a Member of the European Parliament (MEP) since 2019. He is a member of Brothers of Italy (FdI). Procaccini previously held the mayorship of Terracina twice, from 2011 to 2015 and from 2016 to 2019.

In March 2024, Procaccini was one of twenty MEPs to be given a "Rising Star" award at The Parliament Magazine's annual MEP Awards.

== Political career ==
=== Early life and beginnings ===
Procaccini became involved in politics at a young age, joining the Youth Front in 1995 and subsequently rising to become national director of Azione Giovani, the youth movement of the National Alliance. At the age of 21, he was elected for the first time as a municipal councillor in Terracina, the city where he grew up.

In 2002, he obtained a law degree from Sapienza University of Rome, with a thesis in administrative law. Between 2001 and 2008 he worked in the parliamentary press office of the Chamber of Deputies. He also served as a foreign policy editorialist at L'Indipendente (2005–2007) and as deputy editor-in-chief of Liberal (2007–2008).

From 2008 to 2011, Procaccini served as press spokesperson for Giorgia Meloni, then Minister for Youth in the Berlusconi government.

=== Mayor of Terracina ===
Procaccini served as Mayor of Terracina on two separate occasions: from 30 May 2011 to 6 May 2015, and again from 21 June 2016 to 19 July 2019, when he resigned to take up his seat in the European Parliament.

=== European Parliament ===
At the 2019 European Parliament elections, Procaccini was elected Member of the European Parliament with 45,331 votes in the Central Italy constituency, representing Brothers of Italy.

In February 2023, he was elected co-chair of the European Conservatives and Reformists (ECR) Group in the European Parliament, succeeding fellow Italian Raffaele Fitto, who had been appointed Minister for European Affairs in the Meloni government. He was re-elected to the position in July 2024 following the 2024 European Parliament elections.

As an MEP, Procaccini sits on the Committee on the Environment, the Committee on Employment and Social Affairs, and the Committee on Industry, Research and Energy (ITRE).

== Journalistic career ==
Alongside his political career, Procaccini has worked as a journalist and author of cultural and political publications in numerous national and international newspapers and magazines, including Il Giornale, Il Tempo, Il Secolo d'Italia, and Libero. In 2018 he published the book Il crack di Terracina, issued by Innuendo.
