= Bulgarian National-Patriotic Party =

The Bulgarian National-Patriotic Party (Bulgarian: Българска национално-патриотична партия) was a nationalist political party in Bulgaria. First registered in 2004, its leader was Petar Manolov. The party took part in the 2005 parliamentary election, where it won a single seat as part of the right-wing "Attack" coalition. Its MP then deflected from the coalition and voted in support of the centrist Stanishev Government.

After the 2014 European Parliament election, it was the Bulgarian party with the highest number of formal complaints against it alleging misuse of personal data. The party was formally deregistered in 2018 due to the absence of electoral activity.
