= Antonio Giordano (politician) =

Italian politician (born 1964)

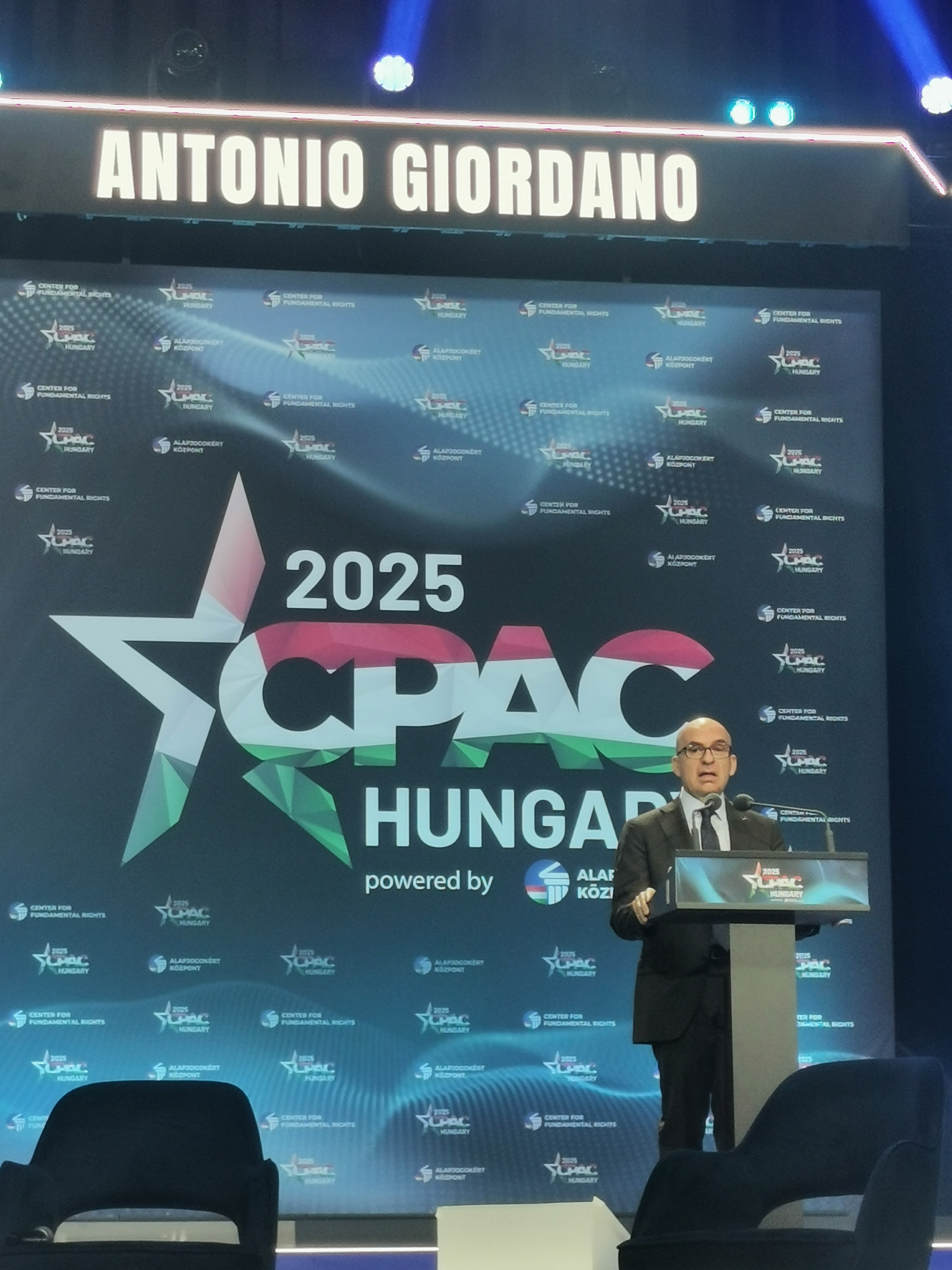
- Giordano in 2025

Member of the Chamber of Deputies
- Incumbent
- Assumed office 13 October 2022
- Constituency: Sicily 1 – 02

Personal details
- Born: 6 June 1964 (age 61)
- Party: Brothers of Italy (since 2012)

Antonio Giordano (born 6 June 1964) is an Italian politician serving as a member of the Chamber of Deputies since 2022. He is the secretary general of the European Conservatives and Reformists Party.
