= Prague Manifesto (disambiguation) =

The Prague Manifesto is a 1944 document of several members of the Committee for the Liberation of the Peoples of Russia to overthrow Joseph Stalin and establish a Nazi-allied government in Russia.

Prague Manifesto may also refer to:

- Prague Manifesto, (1521), written by Thomas Müntzer
- Prague Manifesto (SPD), (1934) document of Rudolf Hilferding demanding revolutionary change in Germany to overthrow fascism
- Manifesto of Prague, (1996) principles of the Esperanto movement drafted at the World Congress of Esperanto
