= European Conservatives and Reformists Party =

Right-wing to far-right European political party

- Abbreviation: ECR Party; ECR
- President: Adam Bielan (PL)
- Secretary-General: Antonio Giordano (IT)
- Vice President: George Simion (RO)
- Founded: 1 October 2009; 17 years ago
- Split from: European People's Party; Union for Europe of the Nations
- Preceded by: Movement for European Reform
- Headquarters: Rue du Trône 4, 1000 Brussels, Belgium
- Think tank: New Direction
- Youth wing: European Young Conservatives
- Membership (22 December 2025): 4
- Ideology: National conservatism; Right-wing populism; Economic liberalism; Soft Euroscepticism
- Political position: Right-wing to far-right
- European Parliament group: European Conservatives and Reformists Group
- International affiliation: International Democracy Union
- Colours: Blue
- European Parliament: 68 / 720
- European Commission: 1 / 27
- European Council: 1 / 27
- EU lower/unicameral houses: 509 / 6,217
- EU upper houses: 150 / 1,459

Website
- ecrparty.eu

The European Conservatives and Reformists Party (ECR Party or simply ECR), formerly known as Alliance of European Conservatives and Reformists (AECR, 2009–2016) and Alliance of Conservatives and Reformists in Europe (ACRE, 2016–2019), is a conservative, soft Eurosceptic European political party with a main focus on reforming the European Union (EU) on the basis of Eurorealism, as opposed to total rejection of the EU (anti-EU-ism).

The political movement was founded on 1 October 2009, after the creation of the European Conservatives and Reformists (ECR) political group of the European Parliament. It was officially recognised by the European Parliament in January 2010.

ECR Party is governed by a board of directors who are elected by the council, which represents all ECR member parties. The executive board is composed of the President Adam Bielan (Member of the European Parliament), Vicepresidents Carlo Fidanza (Italian MEP), Marion Maréchal (French MEP) and George Simion (Romanian member of the Parliament), and Secretary General Antonio Giordano (Italian member of the Parliament).

The party is affiliated with the European Conservatives and Reformists Group in the European Parliament, the pan-European think tank New Direction – The Foundation for European Reform, and the youth organisation the European Young Conservatives. It is also formally associated with the European Conservatives and Reformists Group in the Committee of the Regions, in the Congress of the Council of Europe, and in the NATO Parliamentary Assembly. In the Parliamentary Assembly of the Council of Europe, the ECR Party forms the European Conservatives, Patriots & Affiliates with the Patriots.eu party.

== History ==
=== Foundation ===
The European Conservatives and Reformists Party was founded as the Alliance of European Conservatives and Reformists on 1 October 2009, after the ECR political group was founded in the wake of the 2009 European Parliament election, and was officially recognised by the European Parliament in January 2010. Amongst ACRE's eight founding members, the largest were the UK Conservative Party, the Polish PiS and the Czech ODS.

ECR Party was formally constituted under the chairmanship of Belgian MEP Derk Jan Eppink, who was succeeded by Czech MEP Jan Zahradil. ACRE's first congress took place in Warsaw on 8 June 2010, attended by its founding members, including UK Conservative Party Chairman and Czech Prime Minister Mirek Topolanek. On 25 March 2011, the Civic Conservative Party from Slovakia joined; Iceland's Independence Party in November 2011 (the party's first member from outside the European Union); Georgia's Christian-Democratic Movement in August 2012; Italy's Conservatives and Social Reformers in October 2012; the Conservative Party of Canada became the ACRE's first associate member (later renamed 'regional partners') in November 2012; Turkey's ruling Justice and Development Party in November 2013; and the Faroe Islands' People's Party, and Romania's New Republic; and in July 2014, Prosperous Armenia. The Conservative Party of Georgia and New Majority joined on 1 November 2014. At the same time, the ACRE formally affiliated to the European Conservatives Group in the Parliamentary Assembly of the Council of Europe. In November 2015, the Conservatives and Reformists of Italy were admitted as ECR Party members, followed by the Alliance for Progress and Renewal (ALFA) of Germany and M10 party of Romania in March 2016. The Liberal Party of Australia, Istiqlal Party of Morocco, National Party of New Zealand, and Republican Party of the United States joined as further regional partners in 2014, followed by Afek Tounes and Likud Movement in 2015 and 2016.

The Alliance of European Conservatives and Reformists officially changed its name to the Alliance of Conservatives and Reformists in Europe (ACRE) on 6 October 2016. In December 2018, ACRE was ordered to repay more than half a million euros of EU funds, following an investigation into their spending. This included €250,000 for a three-day conference in Miami and €90,000 for a trade meeting in Kampala. ACRE had previously been asked to return €121,000 given to the Prosperous Armenia party.

More recently, the ECR has seen a shift further towards the conservative right with the acceptance of the Brothers of Italy, Forum for Democracy, Vox, and the Sweden Democrats as members in 2019. On 11 April 2023, the Finns Party joined as the most recent member of the ECR's European Parliament group.

The party has historically been described as centre-right and right-wing. Following the global rise of radical right politics after 2019, the inclusion of new far-right parties led the party to inclination more to the right.

=== Leadership ===
The ECR Party has had four Presidents:

No.	Image	Name	Tenure	Party	Member state
1		Jan Zahradil (born 1963)	2010–2020	Civic Democratic Party	Czech Republic
2		Giorgia Meloni (born 1977)	2020–2025	Brothers of Italy	Italy
3		Mateusz Morawiecki (born 1968)	2025–2026	Law and Justice	Poland
4		Adam Bielan (born 1974)	2026–present	Law and Justice	Poland

== Membership ==
=== Full members ===
Country	Party	Leader	European Parliament	National lower house	National upper house	Position in national legislature
Bulgaria	There is Such a People; Има такъв народ (ITN)	Slavi Trifonov	1 / 17	0 / 240		Extra-parliamentary
Cyprus	National Popular Front; Εθνικό Λαϊκό Μέτωπο (ELAM)	Christos Christou	1 / 6	3 / 56		Opposition
Croatia	Croatian Sovereignists; Hrvatski suverenisti (HS)	Marijan Pavliček	0 / 12	1 / 151		Opposition
Croatia	Home and National Rally; Dom i Nacionalno Okupljanje (DOMiNO)	Mario Radić	1 / 12	3 / 151		Opposition
Croatia	The Bridge; Most	Nikola Grmoja	0 / 12	7 / 151		Opposition
Czech Republic	Civic Democratic Party; Občanská demokratická strana (ODS)	Martin Kupka	3 / 21	34 / 200	23 / 81	Opposition
Denmark	Denmark Democrats; Danmarksdemokraterne (DD)	Inger Støjberg	1 / 15	10 / 179		Opposition
Finland	Finns Party; Perussuomalaiset (PS)	Riikka Purra	1 / 15	46 / 200		Government
France	Identity–Liberties; Identité-Libertés (IDL)	Marion Maréchal	4 / 81	3 / 577	0 / 348	Opposition
Germany	We Citizens; Wir Bürger (WB)	Jürgen Joost	0 / 96	0 / 735	0 / 69	Extra-parliamentary
Italy	Brothers of Italy; Fratelli d'Italia (FdI)	Giorgia Meloni	24 / 76	118 / 400	66 / 200	Government
Latvia	National Alliance; Nacionālā apvienība (NA)	Ilze Indriksone	2 / 9	13 / 100		Opposition
Lithuania	Lithuanian Farmers and Greens Union; Lietuvos valstiečių ir žaliųjų sąjunga (LVŽS)	Aurelijus Veryga	1 / 11	6 / 141		Government
Lithuania	Electoral Action of Poles in Lithuania – Christian Families Alliance; Lietuvos lenkų rinkimų akcija – Krikščioniškų šeimų sąjunga (LLRA–KŠS)	Waldemar Tomaszewski	1 / 11	3 / 141		Government
Luxembourg	Alternative Democratic Reform Party; Alternativ Demokratesch Reformpartei (ADR)	Alexandra Schoos	1 / 6	5 / 60		Opposition
Poland	Law and Justice; Prawo i Sprawiedliwość (PiS)	Jarosław Kaczyński	20 / 53	190 / 460	34 / 100	Opposition
Romania	Alliance for the Union of Romanians; Alianța pentru Unirea Românilor (AUR)	George Simion	3 / 33	63 / 331	28 / 134	Opposition
Romania	The Right Alternative; Alternativa Dreaptă (AD)	Adela Mirza	0 / 33	3 / 330	1 / 136	Opposition
Slovakia	Freedom and Solidarity; Sloboda a Solidarita (SaS)	Branislav Gröhling	0 / 15	19 / 150		Opposition
Sweden	Sweden Democrats; Sverigedemokraterna (SD)	Jimmie Åkesson	3 / 21	73 / 349		Confidence and supply

=== Global partners ===
Country	Party	Leader	Legislature lower house seats	Legislature upper house Seats	Status
Albania	Republican Party of Albania; Partia Republikane e Shqipërisë (PR)	Fatmir Mediu	2 / 140		Opposition
Belarus	BPF Party; Партыя БНФ (ПБНФ)	Vadzim Sarančukoŭ	0 / 110	0 / 64	Banned
Iceland	Centre Party; Miðflokkurinn	Sigmundur Davíð Gunnlaugsson	8 / 63		Opposition
Israel	Likud – National Liberal Movement הַלִּיכּוּד – תנועה לאומית ליברלית	Benjamin Netanyahu	32 / 120		Government
San Marino	Domani Motus Liberi (DML)	Lorenzo Forcellini Reffi	5 / 60		Opposition
United States	Republican Party (GOP)	Joe Gruters	220 / 435	53 / 100	Government

=== Former members ===
ECR Party member parties in 2019. Composed of members from 29 European nations (shown in dark blue) and regional partners from 10 non-European nations (shown in light blue).

- Armenia: Prosperous Armenia (until 2022)
- Azerbaijan: Whole Azerbaijan Popular Front Party (until 2022)
- Belgium: Libertarian, Direct, Democratic (2010–14)
- Bulgaria: Order, Law and Justice (c. 2009)
- Bulgaria: IMRO – Bulgarian National Movement (c. 2026)
- Bulgaria: Reload Bulgaria (until 2019)
- Croatia: Croatian Conservative Party (until 2021, dissolved)
- Faroe Islands: People's Party (until 2022)
- Finland: Blue Reform (until 2022)
- France: France Arise (2019–20)
- Georgia: Conservative Party of Georgia (2014–22)
- Hungary: Hungarian Democratic Forum (2009–11)
- Iceland: Independence Party (2011–2021)
- Italy: Conservatives and Social Reformers (2012–14)
- Italy: Conservatives and Reformists (2015–2017)
- Italy: Direction Italy (2017–2022; merged into fellow ECR member Brothers of Italy in 2019)
- Kosovo: Democratic Party of Kosovo (until 2022)
- Latvia: For Fatherland and Freedom/LNNK (2009–11; merged in 2011 into National Alliance, which became a member in 2014)
- Moldova: Șor Party (2018–22)
- Morocco: Istiqlal Party (2014–18)
- Montenegro: Movement for Changes (until 2022)
- Netherlands: Forum for Democracy (until 2020)
- Netherlands: JA21 (until 2023)
- Northern Cyprus: National Unity Party (until 2022)
- Poland: Poland Comes First (2010–13; dissolved)
- Romania: New Republic (2013–18)
- Slovakia: Civic Conservative Party (2009–22)
- Slovakia: New Majority (until 2021)
- Spain: Vox (2019–2024)
- Turkey: Justice and Development Party (2013–18)
- United Kingdom: Conservative Party (2009–21)

=== Former regional partners ===
- Australia: Liberal Party (until 2022)
- Canada: Conservative Party (until 2022)
- Colombia: Democratic Centre (until 2022)
- Kenya: Jubilee Party (until 2022)
- Maldives: Progressive Party of Maldives (until 2022)
- New Zealand: National Party (until 2022)
- North Macedonia: VMRO – People's Party (until 2025)
- Serbia: Enough is Enough (until 2025)
- Tanzania: Chadema (until 2022)
- Tunisia: Afek Tounes (until 2019)
- United Kingdom (Northern Ireland): Ulster Unionist Party (until 2025)

=== Individual members ===
The ECR also includes a number of individual members, although, as most other European parties, it has not sought to develop mass individual membership.

Below is the evolution of individual membership of the ECR since 2019.

== Funding ==
As a registered European political party, the ECR is entitled to European public funding, which it has received continuously since its first application in 2010.

Below is the evolution of European public funding received by the ECR.

In line with the Regulation on European political parties and European political foundations, the ECR also raises private funds to co-finance its activities. As of 2025, European parties must raise at least 10% of their reimbursable expenditure from private sources, while the rest can be covered using European public funding. (Note: For the purpose of European party funding, "contributions" refer to financial or in-kind support provided by party members, while "donations" refer to the same but provided by non-members.)

Below is the evolution of contributions and donations received by the ECR.

== Elected representatives of member parties ==
=== European institutions ===
Organisation	Institution	Number of seats
European Union	European Parliament	68 / 720 (9%)
European Union	European Commission	1 / 27 (4%)
European Union	European Council (Heads of Government)	1 / 27 (4%)
European Union	Council of the European Union (Participation in Government)	
European Union	Committee of the Regions	26 / 329 (8%)
Council of Europe (as part of ECPA)	Parliamentary Assembly	101 / 612 (17%)

=== European Council ===
Member State	Title	Representative	Political party	Member of the Council since	Portrait
Italy	Prime Minister	Giorgia Meloni	FdI	22 October 2022	

=== European Commission ===
Member State	Portfolio	European Commissioner	Political party	Portrait
Italy	Executive Vice-President for Cohesion and Reforms	Raffaele Fitto	FdI	

== ECR affiliate groupings ==
The ACRE is formally affiliated to groupings in the European Parliament and the Committee of the Regions of the European Union, the Congress of the Council of Europe and the Parliamentary Assembly of the Council of Europe and the NATO Parliamentary Assembly.

=== European Parliament ===
The ECR group is the sixth-largest group in the European Parliament. Founded in 2009, the ECR brings together 64 MEPs from 15 countries. The ECR currently is led by two co-chairmen, Ryszard Legutko of the Polish Law and Justice party and Nicola Procaccini of the Brothers of Italy party.

=== European Commission ===
In the current European Commission, the ECR has one Commissioner.

Portfolio	Commissioner	State	Political party	Photo
Vice-President; European Commissioner for Cohesion Policy, Regional Development, and Cities	Raffaele Fitto	Italy	FdI	

=== European Council ===
Of the 27 heads of state and government that are members of the European Council, one is from the ECR.

Member State	Representative	Title	Political party	Member of the Council since	Photo
Italy	Giorgia Meloni	Prime Minister	FdI	22 October 2022	

=== In third countries ===
Through its global partners, the ECR has two heads of state or government in non-EU countries.

Member State	Representative	Title	Political party	In power since	Photo
Israel	Benjamin Netanyahu	Prime Minister	Likud	29 December 2022	
United States	Donald Trump	President	Republican Party	20 January 2025	

=== Committee of the Regions ===
Following the creation of the ECR Group in the European Parliament in 2009, and the creation of the ACRE in 2010, the ECR Group in the Committee of the Regions was formed on 10 April 2013 under the leadership of Gordon Keymer CBE and with the support of the ACRE. The Group was officially announced during the 11–12 April 100th Committee of the Regions plenary session.

The ECR Group was the first Group to be formed in the Committee of the Regions during the course of a mandate and was the first ECR Group to be formed outside of the European Parliament.

The President of the Group is Cllr. Gordon Keymer CBE (Leader of Tandridge District Council) and the vice-presidents are Dan Jiránek (Mayor of Kladno) and Daiva Matonienė (Deputy Mayor of Šiauliai City Council). Adam Banaszak (Member of the Kujawsko-Pomorskie regional assembly), Cllr. Kay Twitchen OBE (Member of Essex County Council) and Cllr. Judith Pearce (Deputy Leader of Wychavon District Council and executive board member for Planning, Infrastructure and Housing).

Country	Party name	Members		Other affiliations		
Country	Party name	Full	Affiliate	European party	EU Parliament	International
Czech Republic	Civic Democratic Party	3	1	ACRE	ECR	IDU
Denmark	Danish People's Party	0	2	MELD	ECR	None
Finland	Finns Party	1	1	ACRE	ECR	None
Lithuania	Independent	1	3	None	None	None
Netherlands	Christian Union	1	1	ECPM	ECR	None
Poland	Law and Justice	1	4	ACRE	ECR	None
Slovakia	Independent politician	1	0	None	None	None
United Kingdom	Conservative Party	7	8	ACRE	None	IDU

=== Parliamentary Assembly of the Council of Europe ===
The European Conservatives Group in the European Parliament, founded in 1970 and existing for most of its history as the 'European Democrat Group' became officially affiliated to the ACRE on 29 September 2014. The EC group is led by Samad Seyidov MP, of the New Azerbaijan Party.

As of 23 October 2014, the European Conservatives have the following members:

Country	Party name	Members	Other affiliations		
Country	Party name	Members	European party	EU Parliament	International
Armenia	Prosperous Armenia	2	ACRE	N/A	None
Armenia	Republican Party of Armenia ^{[A]}	1	None	N/A	None
Azerbaijan	New Azerbaijan Party	4	None	N/A	None
Azerbaijan	Independent	1	None	N/A	None
Czech Republic	Civic Democratic Party	2	ACRE	ECR	IDU
Denmark	Danish People's Party	1	None	ECR	None
Greece	Independent Greeks	1	None	ECR	None
Norway	Progress Party	2	None	N/A	None
Poland	Law and Justice	7	ECRP	ECR	None
Poland	United Poland	1	MELD	No MEPs	None
Turkey	Justice and Development Party ^{[B]}	13	ACRE	N/A	None
Turkey	Nationalist Movement Party^{[C]}	1	None	N/A	None
Ukraine	Party of Regions ^{[D]}	4	None	N/A	None
Ukraine	Sovereign European Ukraine	1	None	N/A	None
Ukraine	Independent	1	None	N/A	None
United Kingdom	Conservative Party	17	ACRE	N/A	IDU
	^A One of the three members of the Republican Party of Armenia sit with the EC Group. The other two members sit with the European People's Party.^B Eleven of the thirteen members of the Justice and Development Party sit with the EC Group. One sits with the European People's Party and one sits with the Alliance of Liberals and Democrats for Europe.^C One of the two members of the Nationalist Movement Party sits with the EC Group. The other member sits with the Socialist Group.^D Four of the seven members of Party of Regions sit with the EC Group. Two sit with the Socialist Group and one sits with the Alliance of Liberals and Democrats for Europe.				

=== Congress of the Council of Europe ===
The ECR group in the Congress of the Council of Europe brings together representatives in local government from across Europe. It has 31 members, 26 of whom represent parties in the ECRP.

Country	Party name	Members	Other affiliations		
Country	Party name	Members	European party	EU Parliament	International
Armenia	Prosperous Armenia	1	ACRE	N/A	None
Czech Republic	Civic Democratic Party	3	ACRE	ECR	IDU
Czech Republic	Independent	2	None	N/A	None
Denmark	Danish People's Party	1	None	ECR	None
Norway	Progress Party	2	None	N/A	None
Poland	Law and Justice	1	ACRE	ECR	None
Poland	Independent	1	None	N/A	None
Turkey	Nationalist Movement Party	5	None	N/A	None
Ukraine	People's Party	1	None	N/A	None
United Kingdom	Conservative Party	11	ACRE	ECR	IDU

== Youth organisation ==
=== European Young Conservatives ===
The European Young Conservatives (EYC) is the party's youth wing. It brings together youth wings of conservative political parties from across Europe. As of 2020, the group had a membership of 30 political youth organisations from 30 countries and territories. Its patron was Margaret Thatcher until her death in 2013.

Country	Organisation	Mother party
Armenia	Prosperous Armenia Youth	Prosperous Armenia
Belarus	BPF Youth	BPF Party
Belgium	Jong N-VA	N-VA
Czech Republic	Young Conservatives	Civic Democratic Party
Denmark	Young Conservatives	Conservative People's Party
Faroe Islands	Huxa	People's Party
Finland	Finns Party Youth	Finns Party
Georgia	Young Conservatives	Conservative Party of Georgia
Italy	National Youth	Brothers of Italy
Latvia	For Fatherland and Freedom/LNNK Youth Club	For Fatherland and Freedom/LNNK
Liechtenstein	Junge FBP	Progressive Citizens' Party
Lithuania	Electoral Action of Poles in Lithuania Youth Organisation	Electoral Action of Poles in Lithuania
Luxembourg	ADRenalin	Alternative Democratic Reform Party
Norway	Progress Party's Youth	Progress Party
Poland	Law and Justice Youth Forum	Law and Justice
Portugal	People's Youth	Democratic and Social Centre – People's Party
Romania	New Republic Youth	New Republic
Switzerland	Young SVP	Swiss People's Party
Turkey	AKP Youth	Justice and Development Party
United Kingdom	Young Conservatives	Conservative Party

== Principles ==
ECRP adopted the Reykjavík Declaration at its Council Meeting on 21 March 2014. The declaration defines the principles that underpin ECR.

The Reykjavík Declaration

- The European Conservatives and Reformists Party brings together parties committed to individual liberty, national sovereignty, parliamentary democracy, the rule of law, private property, low taxes, sound money, free trade, open competition, and the devolution of power.
- ECRP believes in a Europe of independent nations, working together for mutual gain while each retaining its identity and integrity.
- ECRP is committed to the equality of all European democracies, whatever their size, and regardless of which international associations they join.
- ECRP favours the exercise of power at the lowest practicable level—by the individual where possible, by local or national authorities in preference to supranational bodies.
- ECRP understands that open societies rest upon the dignity and autonomy of the individual, who should be as free as possible from state coercion. The liberty of the individual includes freedom of religion and worship, freedom of speech and expression, freedom of movement and association, freedom of contract and employment, and freedom from oppressive, arbitrary or punitive taxation.
- ECRP recognises the equality of all citizens before the law, regardless of ethnicity, sex or social class. It rejects all forms of extremism, authoritarianism and racism.
- ECRP cherishes the important role of civil associations, families and other bodies that fill the space between the individual and the government.
- ECRP acknowledges the unique democratic legitimacy of the nation-state.
- ECRP is committed to the spread of free commerce and open competition, in Europe and globally.
- ECRP supports the principles of the Prague Declaration of March 2009 and the work of the European Conservatives and Reformists in the European Parliament and allied groups on the other European assemblies.

== Election results ==
European Parliament

Year	Lead Candidate	Seats %	Seats	Status	Ref
2024	None	9.2 (#3)	66 / 720 (Note: Including 4 individual members)	Opposition	

== See also ==
- European Conservatives
- European People's Party
- Identity and Democracy Party
- Patriots for Europe
- European political party
- Authority for European Political Parties and European Political Foundations
- European political foundation
