= Prague Declaration of European Conservatives and Reformists =

The Prague Declaration gathers the Principles of the European Conservatives and Reformists Group (ECR), decided and pronounced in March 2009.

The preamble brings up the need to reform the European Union (EU) according to the principles of both liberal and conservative ideas and values. The core elements are the following ones:

- Free enterprise, free and fair trade and competition, minimal regulation, lower taxation, and small government as the ultimate catalysts for individual freedom and personal and national prosperity.
- Freedom of the individual, more personal responsibility and greater democratic accountability.
- Sustainable, clean energy supply with an emphasis on energy security.
- The importance of the family as the bedrock of society.
- The sovereign integrity of the nation state, opposition to EU federalism and a renewed respect for true subsidiarity.
- The overriding value of the transatlantic security relationship in a revitalised NATO, and support for young democracies across Europe.
- Effectively controlled immigration and an end to abuse of asylum procedures.
- Efficient and modern public services and sensitivity to the needs of both rural and urban communities.
- An end to waste and excessive bureaucracy and a commitment to greater transparency and probity in the EU institutions and use of EU funds.
- Respect and equitable treatment for all EU countries, new and old, large and small.
