= Leadership opinion polling for the 2026 Spanish general election =

In the run up to the 2026 Spanish general election, various organisations carry out opinion polling to gauge the opinions that voters hold towards political leaders. Results of such polls are displayed in this article. The date range for these opinion polls is from the previous general election, held on 23 July 2023, to the day the next election will be held, on 29 November 2026.

== Preferred prime minister ==
The tables below list opinion polling on leader preferences to become prime minister.

=== All candidates ===
Polling firm/Commissioner	Fieldwork date	Sample size											Other/ None/ Not care	Question	Lead
Polling firm/Commissioner	Fieldwork date	Sample size	Feijóo PP	Ayuso PP	Sánchez PSOE	Abascal Vox	Díaz Sumar	Colau FA	Montero Podemos	Belarra Podemos	Alvise SALF	Rufián ERC	Other/ None/ Not care	Question	Lead
40dB/Prisa	17–21 Nov 2026	2,000	24.2	–	32.9	16.7	–	4.1	2.8	–	–	–	14.1	5.1	8.7
SocioMétrica/El Español	1 Sep–21 Nov 2026	6,842	25.4	–	25.2	14.5	–	4.1	2.5	–	2.7	–	25.5	–	0.2
40dB/Prisa	16–20 Nov 2026	2,000	23.1	–	32.5	16.7	–	4.6	2.9	–	–	–	14.9	5.3	9.4
Ipsos/La Vanguardia	13–20 Nov 2026	1,999	24.0	–	31.0	13.0	–	5.0	–	–	–	–	9.0	18.0	7.0
More in Common	16–19 Nov 2026	2,315 (Note: Weighted by 2023 vote.)	23.1	–	23.2	17.4	–	3.0	2.4	–	–	10.1	14.3	6.5	0.1
40dB/Prisa	15–19 Nov 2026	2,000	23.1	–	31.8	16.9	–	4.5	2.5	–	–	–	15.0	6.2	8.7
40dB/Prisa	14–18 Nov 2026	2,000	23.1	–	32.0	16.6	–	4.6	2.5	–	–	–	15.0	6.3	8.9
SW Demoscopia/La Séptima	26 Oct–18 Nov 2026	10,500	25.6	–	29.2	11.1	–	4.0	1.1	–	–	6.3	17.7	5.0	3.6
40dB/Prisa	13–17 Nov 2026	2,000	22.5	–	32.4	16.6	–	4.8	2.8	–	–	–	15.1	5.9	9.9
SW Demoscopia/La Séptima	26 Oct–17 Nov 2026	10,000	25.3	–	29.0	11.0	–	4.0	1.1	–	–	6.5	17.9	5.2	3.7
40dB/Prisa	12–16 Nov 2026	2,000	22.2	–	32.8	17.3	–	4.3	2.8	–	–	–	15.6	5.0	10.6
SW Demoscopia/La Séptima	26 Oct–16 Nov 2026	9,500	25.1	–	28.8	11.0	–	3.9	1.1	–	–	6.6	18.2	5.2	3.7
40dB/Prisa	10–15 Nov 2026	2,500	21.1	–	32.1	19.0	–	4.4	2.9	–	–	–	15.9	4.7	11.0
SocioMétrica/El Español	1 Sep–15 Nov 2026	5,923	23.7	–	23.5	14.4	–	4.2	2.7	–	2.3	–	29.2	–	0.2
40dB/Prisa	10–14 Nov 2026	2,000	20.7	–	31.5	20.0	–	4.5	2.9	–	–	–	16.0	4.4	10.8
SW Demoscopia/La Séptima	26 Oct–14 Nov 2026	8,500	24.9	–	28.7	11.0	–	3.9	1.1	–	–	6.7	18.5	5.3	3.8
40dB/Prisa	10–13 Nov 2026	1,500	20.6	–	30.7	20.5	–	4.5	2.7	–	–	–	16.5	4.5	10.1
SW Demoscopia/La Séptima	26 Oct–13 Nov 2026	8,000	24.8	–	28.5	10.9	–	3.8	1.1	–	–	6.7	18.6	5.4	3.7
40dB/Prisa	10–12 Nov 2026	1,000	21.1	–	29.2	21.2	–	4.8	2.7	–	–	–	16.0	5.0	8.0
SW Demoscopia/La Séptima	26 Oct–12 Nov 2026	7,500	24.9	–	28.3	11.0	–	3.7	1.1	–	–	6.7	19.0	5.5	3.4
SW Demoscopia/La Séptima	26 Oct–11 Nov 2026	7,000	25.0	–	28.4	10.9	–	3.5	1.1	–	–	6.7	18.9	5.5	3.4
SW Demoscopia/La Séptima	26 Oct–10 Nov 2026	6,500	24.9	–	28.7	10.9	–	3.4	1.1	–	–	6.7	18.8	5.6	3.8
SW Demoscopia/La Séptima	26 Oct–9 Nov 2026	6,000	24.7	–	28.6	10.7	–	3.5	1.2	–	–	6.7	19.0	5.6	3.9
SocioMétrica/El Español	1 Sep–8 Nov 2026	5,460	23.7	–	22.9	14.2	–	4.2	2.4	–	2.4	–	30.2	–	0.8
SW Demoscopia/La Séptima	26 Oct–7 Nov 2026	5,000	24.5	–	28.5	10.7	–	3.5	1.1	–	–	6.8	19.2	5.8	4.0
SW Demoscopia/La Séptima	26 Oct–6 Nov 2026	4,500	24.5	–	28.6	10.6	–	3.5	1.1	–	–	6.7	19.2	5.8	4.1
GESOP	3–5 Nov 2026	946	21.5	–	25.5	13.7	–	4.9	2.5	–	2.9	8.3	5.9	14.8	4.0
Ateneo del Dato/elDiario.es	2–5 Nov 2026	2,000	23.0	–	26.0	19.0	–	3.0	3.0	–	–	13.0	–	12.0	3.0
SW Demoscopia/La Séptima	26 Oct–5 Nov 2026	4,000	24.6	–	28.5	10.6	–	3.5	1.1	–	–	6.6	19.4	5.7	3.9
40dB/Prisa	2–4 Nov 2026	2,000	20.0	–	30.0	19.8	–	4.4	4.0	–	–	–	17.7	4.2	10.0
SW Demoscopia/La Séptima	29 Oct–4 Nov 2026	3,500	24.8	–	28.6	10.5	–	3.5	1.1	–	–	6.5	19.3	5.7	3.8
YouGov/Ara	26 Oct–2 Nov 2026	1,221	26.0	–	23.0	15.0	–	2.0	2.0	–	–	12.0	20.0	–	3.0
SocioMétrica/El Español	1 Sep–1 Nov 2026	4,893	23.8	–	22.8	14.2	–	2.8	2.5	–	2.7	–	31.2	–	1.0
CIS	7–30 Oct 2026	45,074	21.1	1.8	33.2	13.4	1.1	1.8	1.5	–	1.5	7.2	10.1	7.4	12.1
More in Common	21–25 Oct 2026	2,210	20.0	–	19.6	16.5	–	2.0	2.7	–	–	13.5	17.0	8.7	0.4
More in Common	21–25 Oct 2026	2,210 (Note: Weighted by demographics.)	18.8	–	21.2	18.8	–	1.5	2.4	–	–	14.5	15.5	7.3	2.4
SocioMétrica/El Español	1 Sep–25 Oct 2026	3,223	23.1	–	21.7	13.5	–	2.2	3.1	–	3.0	–	33.4	–	1.4
Ateneo del Dato/elDiario.es	20–22 Oct 2026	2,000	21.0	–	26.0	21.0	–	3.0	3.0	–	–	15.0	–	13.0	5.0
GESOP/Prensa Ibérica	6–8 Oct 2026	1,000	19.2	–	25.8	13.9	–	3.1	4.6	–	–	–	28.1	5.2	6.6
CIS	1–6 Oct 2026	5,025	9.6	3.3	25.8	9.1	2.2	–	1.0	–	0.9	8.1	29.2	10.6	16.2
SocioMétrica/El Español	24–26 Sep 2026	1,200	21.6	–	19.8	12.3	7.8	–	–	2.7	2.5	–	33.5	–	1.8
CIS	17–25 Sep 2026	6,028	10.9	2.1	24.6	9.3	3.0	–	1.8	–	1.3	6.0	26.4	14.5	13.7
CIS	4–10 Sep 2026	6,038	12.0	1.2	22.2	9.7	0.9	–	0.4	–	1.1	4.2	26.2	22.2	10.2
CIS	1–4 Sep 2026	4,042	13.2	1.7	25.0	9.8	1.3	–	0.7	0.4	1.4	4.6	28.7	13.2	11.8
More in Common	24–28 Aug 2026	2,144	18.4	–	17.3	16.5	4.2	–	2.1	–	–	10.9	22.0	8.6	1.1
More in Common	24–28 Aug 2026	2,144	17.7	–	20.4	16.3	4.3	–	1.9	–	–	11.5	19.9	8.0	2.7
SocioMétrica/El Español	5–6 Aug 2026	1,690	22.9	–	19.5	11.9	8.3	–	–	2.5	2.2	–	32.7	–	3.4
CIS	13–21 Jul 2026	6,029	12.9	2.4	28.6	8.2	1.9	–	0.5	–	0.9	3.8	26.0	14.9	15.7
GESOP/Prensa Ibérica	6–9 Jul 2026	1,001	16.0	–	25.2	11.2	7.9	–	4.7	–	–	–	30.5	4.5	9.2
CIS	1–6 Jul 2026	4,020	13.9	2.6	26.7	9.2	2.1	–	0.7	–	1.6	4.6	26.3	12.4	12.8
SocioMétrica/El Español	2–4 Jul 2026	1,416	20.5	–	19.0	12.4	8.1	–	–	2.5	2.6	–	34.9	–	1.5
More in Common	24–28 Jun 2026	2,277	18.3	–	16.3	15.1	5.7	–	1.9	–	–	11.5	22.1	9.1	2.0
More in Common	24–28 Jun 2026	2,277	18.0	–	18.9	15.9	5.8	–	1.8	–	–	12.7	18.9	8.0	0.9
CIS	9–12 Jun 2026	4,027	11.8	3.7	23.8	10.5	2.3	–	0.8	–	1.4	6.4	29.0	10.2	12.0
CIS	1–4 Jun 2026	4,024	13.4	2.9	25.0	9.5	2.2	–	0.8	–	1.2	5.0	27.6	12.4	11.6
SocioMétrica/El Español	28–30 May 2026	1,200	19.6	–	20.8	13.4	7.6	–	–	3.0	2.8	–	32.8	–	1.2
CIS	4–19 May 2026	3,493	9.0	3.3	23.5	7.4	2.2	–	0.8	–	1.5	4.2	32.1	16.0	14.5
CIS	4–18 May 2026	4,016	13.8	2.8	29.4	9.3	2.5	–	0.6	0.4	1.4	4.4	24.5	10.9	15.6
CIS	22–30 Apr 2026	6,001	11.6	4.0	29.5	8.2	3.0	–	1.0	0.3	1.3	5.6	23.4	12.2	17.9
More in Common	21–25 Apr 2026	2,547	18.9	–	18.7	15.1	4.4	–	1.9	–	–	10.3	21.4	9.3	0.2
More in Common	21–25 Apr 2026	2,547	18.7	–	22.3	15.2	4.3	–	1.9	–	–	11.6	18.1	7.9	3.6
SocioMétrica/El Español	15–18 Apr 2026	1,712	17.6	–	22.1	14.2	8.1	–	–	2.8	2.1	–	33.1	–	4.5
CIS	6–10 Apr 2026	4,020	9.9	2.7	31.3	7.4	2.5	–	0.6	0.3	1.0	4.2	28.1	11.9	21.4
SocioMétrica/El Español	19–21 Mar 2026	1,100	18.6	–	19.0	14.0	8.0	–	–	2.8	2.5	–	35.1	–	0.4
CIS	5–12 Mar 2026	4,009	8.3	3.7	26.7	8.1	2.8	–	0.7	–	0.9	6.0	25.0	17.8	18.4
CIS	2–6 Mar 2026	4,016	9.9	2.9	25.7	9.4	3.0	–	0.6	–	1.3	5.8	28.9	12.7	15.1
CIS	20–27 Feb 2026	5,015	9.8	1.7	20.6	10.8	3.4	–	0.7	–	1.5	6.3	29.1	16.2	9.8
SocioMétrica/El Español	11–13 Feb 2026	1,200	18.5	–	18.9	14.2	8.4	–	–	2.8	2.8	–	34.5	–	0.4
CIS	2–6 Feb 2026	4,027	9.9	3.4	25.3	10.2	3.1	–	0.8	–	1.6	4.2	30.6	10.9	15.1
CIS	22–30 Jan 2026	5,007	7.5	2.7	21.4	8.5	3.7	–	0.7	0.6	0.8	4.2	30.8	19.2	12.9
GESOP/Prensa Ibérica	12–15 Jan 2026	1,002	17.0	–	22.9	11.8	10.4	–	4.0	–	–	–	26.1	7.8	5.9
SocioMétrica/El Español	7–10 Jan 2026	1,300	19.3	–	17.9	14.6	10.5	–	3.3	–	3.0	–	31.4	–	1.4
CIS	5–10 Jan 2026	4,006	9.7	3.8	24.5	10.4	3.1	–	0.6	0.3	1.3	4.2	31.3	10.7	14.1
CIS	18–23 Dec 2025	3,022	11.0	3.2	23.4	11.3	3.3	–	0.6	–	1.1	4.3	28.3	13.4	12.1
SocioMétrica/El Español	5–7 Dec 2025	1,100	20.1	–	18.1	13.3	9.4	–	2.9	–	2.2	–	34.0	–	2.0
CIS	1–5 Dec 2025	4,017	10.6	2.6	23.4	9.6	4.2	–	0.7	0.3	1.6	5.2	29.2	12.6	13.5
40dB/Prisa	27 Nov–1 Dec 2025	2,500	16.7	–	22.7	20.2	8.6	–	4.0	–	–	–	22.7	5.0	2.5
CIS	3–12 Nov 2025	4,028	8.9	2.9	24.5	11.0	3.8	–	0.7	0.3	0.4	3.6	32.0	11.9	13.5
SocioMétrica/El Español	6–8 Nov 2025	1,100	20.8	–	17.5	12.7	9.7	–	–	2.1	2.2	–	35.0	–	3.3
SocioMétrica/El Español	6–10 Oct 2025	900	20.1	–	17.1	12.6	9.7	–	–	2.2	2.3	–	36.0	–	3.0
GESOP/Prensa Ibérica	3–9 Oct 2025	1,000	14.4	–	22.3	13.0	7.9	–	3.0	–	–	5.9	27.3	6.2	7.9
CIS	1–7 Oct 2025	4,029	8.4	3.0	26.4	10.0	4.4	–	0.9	0.5	0.8	2.7	32.1	10.7	16.4
Opina 360/Antena 3	25–30 Sep 2025	1,203	19.2	0.8	25.3	15.6	12.1	–	0.6	–	0.5	2.0	23.2	0.8	6.1
CIS	1–6 Sep 2025	4,122	9.7	3.2	24.8	10.8	4.8	–	1.0	0.6	1.1	2.0	28.9	13.0	14.0
CIS	28–31 Jul 2025	2,896	11.1	2.5	25.2	9.3	4.2	–	0.6	0.5	0.7	2.2	26.0	17.5	14.1
SocioMétrica/El Español	26–29 Aug 2025	1,100	20.8	–	15.2	12.0	9.6	–	–	3.8	3.4	–	35.2	–	5.6
SocioMétrica/El Español	21–24 Jul 2025	1,100	22.1	–	15.4	11.5	10.5	–	–	3.7	2.9	–	34.1	–	6.7
CIS	1–7 Jul 2025	4,018	11.4	5.7	22.5	11.3	3.6	–	1.0	0.5	1.3	1.7	30.2	10.9	11.1
SocioMétrica/El Español	18–21 Jun 2025	1,150	21.0	–	18.8	12.0	11.3	–	–	2.5	2.2	–	32.2	–	2.2
CIS	12–19 Jun 2025	4,004	9.2	3.3	21.8	9.5	4.2	–	1.0	0.5	1.1	0.5	31.7	17.3	12.3
GESOP/Prensa Ibérica	10–12 Jun 2025	1,002	18.2	–	23.8	11.6	8.9	–	3.8	–	–	–	27.4	6.3	5.6
CIS	8 May–12 Jun 2025	15,017	12.1	6.7	23.7	7.8	4.9	–	1.0	0.5	0.9	1.1	26.7	14.7	11.6
CIS	2–7 Jun 2025	4,013	10.0	5.4	25.8	6.4	3.8	–	0.8	0.5	0.7	0.6	31.9	14.0	15.8
40dB/Prisa	23–26 May 2025	2,000	16.6	–	24.6	17.1	8.7	–	–	–	–	–	25.4	7.6	7.5
SocioMétrica/El Español	19–22 May 2025	1,812	18.7	–	20.2	12.3	8.3	–	–	2.6	2.6	–	35.3	–	1.5
CIS	5–8 May 2025	4,018	10.2	6.4	25.4	7.4	3.7	–	0.9	0.5	1.1	–	31.8	12.7	15.2
SocioMétrica/El Español	21–25 Apr 2025	1,000	18.1	–	19.7	11.3	7.6	–	–	2.8	2.4	–	38.1	–	1.6
CIS	1–8 Apr 2025	4,009	9.8	6.3	24.7	7.9	3.6	–	0.7	0.9	1.0	0.8	31.5	12.9	14.9
SocioMétrica/El Español	19–21 Mar 2025	1,903	18.1	–	19.2	9.5	8.2	–	–	2.6	2.5	–	39.9	–	1.1
CIS	28 Feb–7 Mar 2025	4,018	11.0	5.4	27.1	6.9	3.4	–	0.3	0.5	1.2	0.6	30.3	13.3	16.1
GESOP/Prensa Ibérica	3–6 Mar 2025	1,000	19.5	–	24.6	10.7	11.4	–	–	–	–	–	28.7	5.1	5.1
SocioMétrica/El Español	12–14 Feb 2025	1,812	18.8	–	18.4	10.0	9.7	–	–	3.3	2.6	–	37.2	–	0.4
CIS	31 Jan–6 Feb 2025	4,042	9.7	6.0	25.8	7.1	4.3	–	0.7	0.9	1.1	0.4	32.0	11.9	16.1
CIS	10–16 Jan 2025	5,006	10.3	5.9	23.9	6.2	4.7	–	0.5	0.3	1.2	–	28.7	18.2	13.6
CIS	2–9 Jan 2025	4,024	9.9	5.1	23.7	6.7	3.9	–	0.9	–	1.2	–	35.7	13.0	13.8
SocioMétrica/El Español	26–30 Dec 2024	2,953	18.9	–	18.5	9.8	10.6	–	–	–	3.0	–	39.3	–	0.4
CIS	2–9 Dec 2024	4,621	10.3	6.3	23.6	5.5	3.7	–	0.6	–	1.3	–	34.4	14.2	13.3
GESOP/Prensa Ibérica	2–4 Dec 2024	1,001	18.3	–	24.1	10.3	13.9	–	–	–	–	–	28.0	5.4	5.8
SocioMétrica/El Español	22–24 Nov 2024	1,227	20.4	–	17.9	9.9	11.5	–	–	–	2.7	–	40.3	–	2.5
CIS	2–7 Nov 2024	4,010	8.6	4.4	22.1	6.9	3.8	–	0.8	–	1.1	–	39.7	12.5	13.5
SocioMétrica/El Español	16–18 Oct 2024	2,240	21.1	–	22.0	9.8	11.5	–	–	–	3.0	–	35.6	–	0.9
CIS	1–11 Oct 2024	4,005	13.3	5.0	24.3	6.6	4.2	–	0.6	–	1.4	–	32.3	12.3	11.0
GESOP/Prensa Ibérica	23–26 Sep 2024	1,004	21.7	–	25.6	9.8	15.4	–	–	–	–	–	22.7	3.8	3.9
CIS	2–6 Sep 2024	4,027	12.1	4.5	24.8	6.3	4.8	–	0.6	–	1.2	–	29.0	16.5	12.7
SocioMétrica/El Español	26–31 Aug 2024	2,310	19.9	–	23.5	10.6	11.8	–	–	–	4.0	–	34.2	–	3.6
SocioMétrica/El Español	18–20 Jul 2024	1,200	20.7	–	22.4	10.9	10.9	–	–	–	4.1	–	35.1	–	1.7
CIS	1–4 Jul 2024	4,007	13.5	3.7	26.5	6.8	4.7	–	1.5	–	1.0	–	31.0	11.2	13.0
CIS	17–21 Jun 2024	3,010	18.4	7.0	25.5	8.1	7.4	–	1.3	–	3.1	–	18.3	10.8	7.1
CIS	6–11 Jun 2024	4,006	11.8	3.2	25.7	5.6	6.0	–	0.9	0.5	1.1	–	26.2	19.1	13.9
CIS	31 May–6 Jun 2024	4,011	13.6	3.2	27.4	6.5	5.8	–	–	–	–	–	31.1	12.3	13.8
GESOP/Prensa Ibérica	27–31 May 2024	1,013	23.7	–	29.7	7.5	12.9	–	–	–	–	–	21.9	4.3	6.0
CIS	27–30 May 2024	7,491	21.2	4.8	32.0	9.0	6.6	–	–	–	–	–	15.9	10.5	10.8
SocioMétrica/El Español	17–19 May 2024	519	22.6	–	25.8	11.7	9.7	–	–	–	–	–	30.2	–	3.2
CIS	8–17 May 2024	6,434	20.4	6.1	30.2	9.6	7.5	–	1.0	–	–	–	15.9	10.4	9.8
CIS	3–8 May 2024	4,013	12.5	5.1	27.8	6.2	5.9	–	–	–	–	–	30.4	12.1	15.3
SocioMétrica/El Español	30 Apr–4 May 2024	1,279	25.4	–	20.3	11.1	12.2	–	–	–	–	–	31.0	–	5.1
SocioMétrica/El Español	9–12 Apr 2024	2,550	23.6	–	21.7	11.0	13.8	–	–	–	–	–	29.9	–	1.9
CIS	1–4 Apr 2024	4,032	16.6	5.6	25.3	6.4	6.5	–	–	–	–	–	26.6	13.0	8.7
SocioMétrica/El Español	5–9 Mar 2024	2,900	24.0	–	21.6	10.0	14.8	–	–	–	–	–	29.6	–	2.4
CIS	1–5 Mar 2024	3,931	16.5	5.3	23.3	5.9	6.3	–	–	–	–	–	30.3	12.4	6.8
GESOP/Prensa Ibérica	19–21 Feb 2024	1,004	27.7	–	24.9	6.7	13.9	–	–	–	–	–	21.8	5.0	2.8
SocioMétrica/El Español	5–9 Feb 2024	2,900	28.0	–	26.4	10.6	14.6	–	–	–	–	–	20.4	–	1.6
CIS	1–6 Feb 2024	3,926	17.2	3.5	25.6	5.0	7.2	–	–	–	–	–	29.7	11.9	8.4
CIS	11–23 Jan 2024	5,973	15.4	4.3	24.6	5.2	7.6	–	–	–	–	–	28.8	14.2	9.2
SocioMétrica/El Español	25–31 Dec 2023	2,309	28.3	–	26.9	9.9	16.4	–	–	–	–	–	18.5	–	1.4
CIS	2–5 Jan 2024	4,016	16.5	3.8	30.4	4.0	6.0	–	–	–	–	–	29.0	10.4	13.9
CIS	11–15 Dec 2023	6,195	19.1	4.4	31.0	5.9	6.5	–	–	–	–	–	19.4	13.4	11.9
CIS	1–7 Dec 2023	4,613	16.5	5.3	27.9	4.6	8.5	–	–	–	–	–	27.5	9.8	11.4
SocioMétrica/El Español	20–24 Nov 2023	2,109	29.1	–	27.9	9.9	15.7	–	–	–	–	–	17.4	–	1.2
CIS	31 Oct–6 Nov 2023	4,090	21.0	4.1	27.7	5.6	6.6	–	–	–	–	–	23.7	11.3	6.7
SocioMétrica/El Español	25–27 Oct 2023	2,600	29.5	–	27.7	9.5	16.0	–	–	–	–	–	17.3	–	1.8
CIS	18 Sep–16 Oct 2023	27,433	23.6	4.4	28.8	4.4	11.4	–	–	–	–	–	18.6	8.8	5.2
CIS	2–6 Oct 2023	4,031	23.5	5.0	29.2	4.5	9.1	–	–	–	–	–	21.1	9.3	5.7
SocioMétrica/El Español	21–23 Sep 2023	1,429	31.1	–	26.0	9.8	15.4	–	–	–	–	–	17.7	–	5.1
CIS	1–12 Sep 2023	10,104	20.7	5.0	29.7	4.9	13.8	–	–	–	–	–	16.5	9.2	9.0

=== Feijóo vs. Sánchez ===
Polling firm/Commissioner	Fieldwork date	Sample size			Other/ None/ Not care	Question	Lead
Polling firm/Commissioner	Fieldwork date	Sample size	Feijóo PP	Sánchez PSOE	Other/ None/ Not care	Question	Lead
Target Point/El Debate	22 Nov 2026	?	34.1	31.6	20.4	13.9	2.5
SocioMétrica/El Español	1 Sep–21 Nov 2026	6,842	45.3	36.8	–	18.0	8.5
Sigma Dos/El Mundo	14–20 Nov	4,511	28.8	27.1	44.1		1.7
SW Demoscopia/La Séptima	26 Oct–18 Nov 2026	10,500	45.9	46.8	6.4	0.8	0.9
SW Demoscopia/La Séptima	26 Oct–17 Nov 2026	10,000	45.8	46.9	6.6	0.8	1.1
SW Demoscopia/La Séptima	26 Oct–16 Nov 2026	9,500	45.6	46.8	6.7	0.8	1.2
SocioMétrica/El Español	1 Sep–15 Nov 2026	5,923	43.9	35.4	–	20.7	8.5
Sondaxe/La Voz de Galicia	10–14 Nov 2026	1,000	34.4	29.3	36.3		5.1
SW Demoscopia/La Séptima	26 Oct–14 Nov 2026	8,500	45.7	46.9	6.6	0.8	1.2
InvyMark/laSexta	9–13 Nov 2026	?	51.2	46.8	–	2.0	4.4
Sondaxe/La Voz de Galicia	9–13 Nov 2026	1,000	34.5	29.2	32.1	4.2	5.3
SW Demoscopia/La Séptima	26 Oct–13 Nov 2026	8,000	45.6	46.8	6.7	0.9	1.2
SW Demoscopia/La Séptima	26 Oct–12 Nov 2026	7,500	45.9	46.4	6.9	0.9	0.5
SW Demoscopia/La Séptima	26 Oct–11 Nov 2026	7,000	45.9	46.2	7.0	0.8	0.3
SW Demoscopia/La Séptima	26 Oct–10 Nov 2026	6,500	45.8	46.4	6.9	0.9	0.6
SW Demoscopia/La Séptima	26 Oct–9 Nov 2026	6,000	45.7	46.5	6.9	0.8	0.8
SocioMétrica/El Español	1 Sep–8 Nov 2026	5,460	44.0	34.5	–	21.5	9.5
SW Demoscopia/La Séptima	26 Oct–7 Nov 2026	5,000	45.6	46.5	7.1	0.8	0.9
DYM/Henneo	4–6 Nov 2026	1,025	37.8	40.9	–	21.3	3.1
SW Demoscopia/La Séptima	26 Oct–6 Nov 2026	4,500	45.6	46.5	7.1	0.8	0.9
SW Demoscopia/La Séptima	26 Oct–5 Nov 2026	4,000	45.8	46.3	7.0	0.9	0.5
Sondaxe/La Voz de Galicia	2–4 Nov 2026	1,200	31.6	30.5	34.7	3.2	1.1
SW Demoscopia/La Séptima	29 Oct–4 Nov 2026	3,500	46.0	46.4	6.8	0.8	0.4
SocioMétrica/El Español	1 Sep–1 Nov 2026	4,893	43.7	33.2	–	23.1	10.5
Sondaxe/La Voz de Galicia	26–28 Oct 2026	1,200	28.5	31.7	34.1	5.7	3.2
SocioMétrica/El Español	1 Sep–25 Oct 2026	3,223	42.7	32.1	–	25.2	10.6
SocioMétrica/El Español	10–11 Oct 2026	1,000	42.7	35.4	–	21.9	7.3
40dB/Prisa	7–8 Oct 2026	800	29.3	32.2	33.4	5.1	2.9
DYM/Henneo	5–7 Oct 2026	1,011	36.7	37.0	–	26.3	0.3
SocioMétrica/El Español	1–3 Oct 2026	1,000	39.8	35.0	–	25.3	4.8
SocioMétrica/El Español	24–26 Sep 2026	1,200	39.8	35.4	–	24.8	4.4
DYM/Henneo	16–21 Sep 2026	1,017	36.2	34.7	–	29.0	1.5
InvyMark/laSexta	7–11 Sep 2026	1,200	53.9	45.7	–	0.4	8.2
SocioMétrica/El Español	5–6 Aug 2026	1,690	39.7	35.8	–	24.5	3.9
DYM/Henneo	15–20 Jul 2026	1,014	35.6	35.9	–	28.5	0.3
SocioMétrica/El Español	2–4 Jul 2026	1,416	38.2	37.4	–	24.4	0.8
InvyMark/laSexta	22–26 Jun 2026	?	52.8	45.5	–	1.7	7.3
SocioMétrica/El Español	28–30 May 2026	1,200	39.0	37.5	–	23.5	1.5
InvyMark/laSexta	25–29 May 2026	1,200	54.8	44.4	–	0.8	10.4
DYM/Henneo	20–22 May 2026	1,009	36.6	42.9	–	20.5	6.3
SocioMétrica/El Español	15–18 Apr 2026	1,712	36.2	37.4	–	26.4	1.2
DYM/Henneo	19–23 Mar 2026	1,002	32.8	38.9	–	28.3	6.1
SocioMétrica/El Español	19–21 Mar 2026	1,100	35.9	35.0	–	29.1	0.9
EM-Analytics/Electomanía	21–27 Feb 2026	2,307	29.7	37.3	30.6	2.4	7.6
SocioMétrica/El Español	11–13 Feb 2026	1,200	36.3	34.4	–	29.3	1.9
DYM/Henneo	23–24 Jan 2026	1,003	30.2	37.7	–	32.1	7.5
SocioMétrica/El Español	7–10 Jan 2026	1,300	38.3	33.4	–	28.3	4.9
InvyMark/laSexta	15–19 Dec 2025	?	49.7	46.7	–	3.6	3.0
SocioMétrica/El Español	5–7 Dec 2025	1,100	40.3	34.3	–	25.4	6.0
InvyMark/laSexta	1–5 Dec 2025	?	50.5	45.4	–	4.1	5.1
DYM/Henneo	12–14 Nov 2025	1,000	33.7	32.7	–	33.7	1.0
SocioMétrica/El Español	6–8 Nov 2025	1,100	41.0	33.9	–	25.1	7.1
SocioMétrica/El Español	6–10 Oct 2025	900	39.7	34.1	–	26.2	5.6
DYM/Henneo	10–15 Sep 2025	1,016	34.4	34.2	–	31.4	0.2
SocioMétrica/El Español	26–29 Aug 2025	1,100	41.8	32.3	–	25.9	9.5
SocioMétrica/El Español	21–24 Jul 2025	1,100	42.7	31.8	–	25.5	10.9
DYM/Henneo	11–14 Jul 2025	1,000	35.0	34.4	–	30.6	0.6
SocioMétrica/El Español	18–21 Jun 2025	1,150	38.0	34.7	–	27.3	3.3
DYM/Henneo	17 Jun 2025	1,042	34.0	33.6	–	32.4	0.4
SocioMétrica/El Español	19–22 May 2025	1,812	34.6	34.0	–	31.4	0.6
DYM/Henneo	14–19 May 2025	1,057	36.6	33.4	–	30.0	3.2
SocioMétrica/El Español	21–25 Apr 2025	1,000	33.4	33.8	–	32.8	0.4
SocioMétrica/El Español	19–21 Mar 2025	1,903	34.2	32.5	–	33.3	1.7
DYM/Henneo	12–16 Mar 2025	1,001	32.6	36.9	–	30.6	4.3
SocioMétrica/El Español	12–14 Feb 2025	1,812	35.6	32.0	–	32.4	3.6
DYM/Henneo	16–20 Jan 2025	1,014	37.1	36.2	–	26.7	0.9
SocioMétrica/El Español	26–30 Dec 2024	2,953	32.7	31.4	–	35.9	1.3
SocioMétrica/El Español	22–24 Nov 2024	1,227	34.6	31.3	–	34.1	3.3
DYM/Henneo	8–11 Nov 2024	1,015	33.8	36.2	–	30.0	2.4
EM-Analytics/Electomanía	18–25 Oct 2024	1,091	44.8	46.4	8.8	–	1.6
DYM/Henneo	16–18 Oct 2024	1,000	36.7	35.7	–	27.6	1.0
SocioMétrica/El Español	16–18 Oct 2024	2,240	33.8	35.9	–	30.3	2.1
SocioMétrica/El Español	26–31 Aug 2024	2,310	33.6	35.6	–	30.8	2.0
SocioMétrica/El Español	18–20 Jul 2024	1,200	33.3	35.8	–	30.9	2.5
SocioMétrica/El Español	17–19 May 2024	519	34.5	37.9	–	27.6	3.4
SocioMétrica/El Español	30 Apr–4 May 2024	1,279	38.6	36.9	–	24.5	1.7
SocioMétrica/El Español	9–12 Apr 2024	2,550	36.9	35.4	–	27.8	1.5
Sigma Dos/Antena 3	5–15 Mar 2024	2,405	36.7	35.7	21.2	6.4	1.0
SocioMétrica/El Español	5–9 Mar 2024	2,900	35.6	36.8	–	27.6	1.2
EM-Analytics/Electomanía	24 Feb–1 Mar 2024	1,327	43.4	56.6	–	–	13.2
SocioMétrica/El Español	5–9 Feb 2024	2,900	37.9	42.2	–	19.9	4.3
SocioMétrica/El Español	25–31 Dec 2023	2,309	40.0	43.1	–	16.9	3.1
DYM/Henneo	13–15 Dec 2023	1,011	38.7	37.5	–	23.8	1.2
SocioMétrica/El Español	20–24 Nov 2023	2,109	39.9	44.3	–	15.8	4.4
DYM/Henneo	17–18 Nov 2023	1,004	41.8	37.5	–	20.7	4.3
SocioMétrica/El Español	25–27 Oct 2023	2,600	40.2	44.8	–	15.0	4.6
DYM/Henneo	18–22 Oct 2023	1,035	38.8	40.1	–	21.0	1.3
Sigma Dos/Antena3	4–11 Oct 2023	1,440	37.5	37.1	13.9	11.5	0.4
Sigma Dos/El Mundo	25–28 Sep 2023	2,120	37.1	34.6	23.6	4.7	2.5
SocioMétrica/El Español	21–23 Sep 2023	1,429	40.6	37.6	–	21.8	3.0
DYM/Henneo	14–17 Sep 2023	1,003	38.6	40.4	–	21.0	1.8
40dB/Prisa	25–28 Aug 2023	2,000	31.7	45.0	18.3	5.1	13.3
Sigma Dos/El Mundo	17–24 Aug 2023	1,933	33.1	39.5	20.6	6.9	6.4

== Predicted prime minister ==
The table below lists opinion polling on the perceived likelihood for each leader to become prime minister.

Polling firm/Commissioner	Fieldwork date	Sample size			Other/ None/ Not care	Question	Lead
Polling firm/Commissioner	Fieldwork date	Sample size	Feijóo PP	Sánchez PSOE	Other/ None/ Not care	Question	Lead
SocioMétrica/El Español	1 Sep–21 Nov 2026	6,842	50.1	29.1	–	20.8	21.0
SocioMétrica/El Español	20 Nov 2026	1,600	65.0	27.0	–	8.0	38.0
Sigma Dos/El Mundo	14–20 Nov	4,511	58.5	26.1	15.4		32.4
Sondaxe/La Voz de Galicia	16–20 Nov 2026	1,000	51.8	25.9	22.3		25.9
Sigma Dos/El Mundo	11–16 Nov 2026	3,759	58.6	25.3	16.1		33.3
SocioMétrica/El Español	1 Sep–15 Nov 2026	5,923	49.0	28.4	–	22.7	20.6
Sondaxe/La Voz de Galicia	10–14 Nov 2026	1,000	51.8	25.7	22.5		26.1
Sondaxe/La Voz de Galicia	9–13 Nov 2026	1,000	51.4	24.5	24.1		26.9
SocioMétrica/El Español	1 Sep–8 Nov 2026	5,460	48.7	28.0	–	23.3	20.7
Sondaxe/La Voz de Galicia	2–4 Nov 2026	1,200	49.8	28.7	14.0	7.5	21.1
SocioMétrica/El Español	1 Sep–1 Nov 2026	4,893	48.1	27.6	–	24.3	20.5
Sondaxe/La Voz de Galicia	26–28 Oct 2026	1,200	45.8	32.0	11.8	10.4	13.8
SocioMétrica/El Español	1 Sep–25 Oct 2026	3,223	47.3	26.8	–	25.9	20.5
SocioMétrica/El Español	10–11 Oct 2026	1,000	47.8	26.7	–	25.5	21.1
SocioMétrica/El Español	1–3 Oct 2026	1,000	46.0	27.4	–	26.6	18.6
SocioMétrica/El Español	24–26 Sep 2026	1,200	45.2	28.9	–	26.0	16.3
SocioMétrica/El Español	5–6 Aug 2026	1,690	44.8	30.3	–	24.9	14.5
SocioMétrica/El Español	2–4 Jul 2026	1,416	44.4	28.2	–	27.4	16.2
InvyMark/laSexta	22–26 Jun 2026	?	55.4	43.0	–	1.6	12.4
SocioMétrica/El Español	28–30 May 2026	1,200	41.9	30.9	–	27.2	11.0
InvyMark/laSexta	25–29 May 2026	1,200	55.7	43.9	–	0.4	11.8
SocioMétrica/El Español	15–18 Apr 2026	1,712	39.7	33.9	–	26.4	5.8
SocioMétrica/El Español	19–21 Mar 2026	1,100	40.2	29.5	–	30.3	10.7
EM-Analytics/Electomanía	21–27 Feb 2026	2,307	55.7	29.8	7.6	6.9	25.9
SocioMétrica/El Español	11–13 Feb 2026	1,200	43.3	28.2	–	28.5	15.1
SocioMétrica/El Español	7–10 Jan 2026	1,300	40.9	27.7	–	31.4	13.2
InvyMark/laSexta	15–19 Dec 2025	?	51.5	45.7	–	2.8	5.8
SocioMétrica/El Español	5–7 Dec 2025	1,100	38.5	29.6	–	31.9	8.9
InvyMark/laSexta	1–5 Dec 2025	?	50.5	47.0	–	2.5	3.5
SocioMétrica/El Español	6–8 Nov 2025	1,100	39.6	29.0	–	31.4	10.6
SocioMétrica/El Español	6–10 Oct 2025	900	39.8	29.9	–	30.3	9.9
SocioMétrica/El Español	26–29 Aug 2025	1,100	41.7	28.7	–	29.6	13.0
SocioMétrica/El Español	21–24 Jul 2025	1,100	41.5	28.1	–	30.4	13.4
SocioMétrica/El Español	18–21 Jun 2025	1,150	37.4	33.1	–	26.4	4.3
SocioMétrica/El Español	19–22 May 2025	1,812	34.6	35.8	–	29.6	1.2
SocioMétrica/El Español	21–25 Apr 2025	1,000	32.1	34.8	–	33.1	2.7
SocioMétrica/El Español	19–21 Mar 2025	1,903	34.4	32.7	–	32.9	1.7
SocioMétrica/El Español	12–14 Feb 2025	1,812	35.1	33.2	–	31.7	1.9
SocioMétrica/El Español	26–30 Dec 2024	2,953	30.8	32.0	–	37.2	1.2
SocioMétrica/El Español	22–24 Nov 2024	1,227	33.1	30.4	–	36.5	2.7
SocioMétrica/El Español	16–18 Oct 2024	2,240	32.0	39.1	–	29.0	7.1
SocioMétrica/El Español	26–31 Aug 2024	2,310	32.3	38.7	–	29.0	6.4
SocioMétrica/El Español	18–20 Jul 2024	1,200	30.0	40.3	–	29.7	10.3
SocioMétrica/El Español	30 Apr–4 May 2024	1,279	37.4	42.6	–	20.0	5.2
SocioMétrica/El Español	9–12 Apr 2024	2,550	35.0	43.8	–	21.2	8.8
SocioMétrica/El Español	5–9 Mar 2024	2,900	34.4	45.8	–	19.8	11.4
SocioMétrica/El Español	5–9 Feb 2024	2,900	28.9	53.6	–	17.5	24.7
SocioMétrica/El Español	18 Jan 2024	?	29.8	44.0	–	26.2	14.2
SocioMétrica/El Español	25–31 Dec 2023	2,309	23.4	61.4	–	15.2	38.0
SocioMétrica/El Español	20–24 Nov 2023	2,109	24.0	60.3	–	15.7	36.3
SocioMétrica/El Español	25–27 Oct 2023	2,600	24.6	59.4	–	16.0	34.8
SocioMétrica/El Español	21–23 Sep 2023	1,429	27.2	56.7	–	16.1	29.5
SocioMétrica/El Español	21–23 Sep 2023	1,429 (Note: Specific question on "next investiture".)	26.4	51.4	–	22.3	25.0
EM-Analytics/Electomanía	25 Aug–1 Sep 2023	1,004	5.4	68.2	–	26.4	62.8
Sigma Dos/El Mundo	17–24 Aug 2023	1,933	10.2	64.6	13.4	11.7	54.4

== Leader ratings ==
The table below lists opinion polling on leader ratings, on a 0–10 scale: 0 would stand for a "terrible" rating, whereas 10 would stand for "excellent".

Polling firm/Commissioner	Fieldwork date	Sample size									
Polling firm/Commissioner	Fieldwork date	Sample size	Feijóo PP	Sánchez PSOE	Abascal Vox	Díaz Sumar	Colau FA	Belarra Podemos	Montero Podemos	Alvise SALF	Rufián ERC
SocioMétrica/El Español	1 Sep–21 Nov 2026	6,842	3.7	3.1	3.4	–	2.7	–	2.0	2.0	–
GAD3/Vocento	16–19 Nov 2026	1,501	4.6	3.3	3.5	–	3.0	–	2.5	2.3	–
More in Common	16–19 Nov 2026	2,315	4.20	3.52	3.78	–	3.12	–	2.77	–	4.11
SW Demoscopia/La Séptima	26 Oct–18 Nov 2026	10,500	3.76	3.79	2.94	–	2.73	–	–	–	–
SW Demoscopia/La Séptima	26 Oct–17 Nov 2026	10,000	3.74	3.79	2.92	–	2.72	–	–	–	–
SW Demoscopia/La Séptima	26 Oct–16 Nov 2026	9,500	3.71	3.78	2.92	–	2.70	–	–	–	–
SocioMétrica/El Español	1 Sep–15 Nov 2026	5,923	3.5	2.9	3.3	–	2.6	–	2.0	2.0	–
Sondaxe/La Voz de Galicia	10–14 Nov 2026	1,000	4.15	3.65	3.32	–	2.95	–	–	–	–
SW Demoscopia/La Séptima	26 Oct–14 Nov 2026	8,500	3.69	3.77	2.91	–	2.69	–	–	–	–
Sondaxe/La Voz de Galicia	9–13 Nov 2026	1,000	4.10	3.56	3.41	–	2.85	–	–	–	–
SW Demoscopia/La Séptima	26 Oct–13 Nov 2026	8,000	3.68	3.76	2.90	–	2.67	–	–	–	–
Target Point/El Debate	12 Nov 2026	1,013	4.37	3.80	3.68	–	2.96	–	2.83	2.33	–
NC Report/La Razón	6–12 Nov 2026	1,000	4.3	3.4	3.5	–	2.4	–	–	–	–
SW Demoscopia/La Séptima	26 Oct–12 Nov 2026	7,500	3.68	3.74	2.90	–	2.65	–	–	–	–
GESOP	10–11 Nov 2026	966	3.2	3.8	3.1	–	3.0	–	2.6	1.9	3.9
SW Demoscopia/La Séptima	26 Oct–11 Nov 2026	7,000	3.67	3.74	2.89	–	2.63	–	–	–	–
SW Demoscopia/La Séptima	26 Oct–10 Nov 2026	6,500	3.65	3.76	2.87	–	2.63	–	–	–	–
SW Demoscopia/La Séptima	26 Oct–9 Nov 2026	6,000	3.63	3.76	2.85	–	2.64	–	–	–	–
SocioMétrica/El Español	1 Sep–8 Nov 2026	5,460	3.4	2.9	3.3	–	2.5	–	2.0	–	–
SW Demoscopia/La Séptima	26 Oct–7 Nov 2026	5,000	3.61	3.77	2.84	–	2.64	–	–	–	–
DYM/Henneo	4–6 Nov 2026	1,025	3.6	3.5	2.8	–	2.6	–	2.3	–	–
IMOP/El Confidencial	2–6 Nov 2026	1,000	3.3	3.6	2.7	–	2.9	–	2.6	–	–
Sigma Dos/El Mundo	30 Oct–6 Nov 2026	4,172	4.0	3.1	3.4	–	2.8	–	2.4	–	–
SW Demoscopia/La Séptima	26 Oct–6 Nov 2026	4,500	3.6	3.8	2.8	–	2.6	–	–	–	–
GESOP	3–5 Nov 2026	946	3.7	3.6	3.2	–	3.3	–	2.9	2.3	4.2
GAD3/Vocento	3–5 Nov 2026	1,502	4.3	3.4	3.2	–	2.9	–	2.6	1.8	–
NC Report/La Razón	2–5 Nov 2026	1,000	4.3	3.5	3.4	–	2.6	–	–	–	–
SW Demoscopia/La Séptima	26 Oct–5 Nov 2026	4,000	3.6	3.7	2.9	–	2.6	–	–	–	–
Sondaxe/La Voz de Galicia	2–4 Nov 2026	1,200	4.1	3.6	3.5	–	–	–	–	–	–
SW Demoscopia/La Séptima	29 Oct–4 Nov 2026	3,500	3.6	3.7	2.8	–	2.6	–	–	–	–
YouGov/Ara	26 Oct–2 Nov 2026	1,221	3.4	3.3	3.1	–	2.5	–	2.2	–	3.9
SocioMétrica/El Español	1 Sep–1 Nov 2026	4,893	3.4	2.9	3.3	–	2.5	–	2.0	1.9	–
Sigma Dos/El Mundo	29–30 Oct 2026	2,505	3.9	3.2	3.3	–	2.9	–	2.4	–	–
Target Point/El Debate	28–30 Oct 2026	1,024	3.88	3.51	3.49	–	3.00	–	2.79	2.29	–
GESOP	27–30 Oct 2026	989	3.1	3.9	2.9	–	3.2	–	2.8	1.8	4.2
CIS	7–30 Oct 2026	45,074	3.88	4.65	3.41	–	3.82	–	3.56	–	5.21
NC Report/La Razón	26–29 Oct 2026	1,000	4.4	3.6	3.5	–	2.6	–	–	–	–
Sondaxe/La Voz de Galicia	26–28 Oct 2026	1,200	4.0	3.8	3.5	–	3.1	–	–	–	–
More in Common	21–25 Oct 2026	2,210	3.81	3.55	3.67	–	2.99	–	2.67	–	4.41
SocioMétrica/El Español	1 Sep–25 Oct 2026	3,223	3.2	2.8	3.1	–	2.4	–	2.0	1.9	–
NC Report/La Razón	22–24 Oct 2026	1,000	4.4	3.5	3.5	–	–	–	–	–	–
Sigma Dos/El Mundo	8–22 Oct 2026	3,122	3.7	3.3	3.3	–	2.9	–	2.6	–	–
Sigma Dos/El Mundo	1–14 Oct 2026	3,007	3.7	3.2	3.2	–	2.8	–	2.6	–	–
Target Point/El Debate	6–9 Oct 2026	1,002	3.27	3.81	3.03	3.47	–	2.41	–	1.72	–
GESOP/Prensa Ibérica	6–8 Oct 2026	1,000	3.5	3.7	3.0	–	3.2	–	3.1	–	–
GAD3/Vocento	6–8 Oct 2026	1,077	4.0	3.2	3.1	–	2.9	–	2.5	2.1	–
DYM/Henneo	5–7 Oct 2026	1,011	3.3	3.5	3.0	3.3	–	2.4	–	–	–
CIS	1–6 Oct 2026	5,025	3.43	4.42	2.89	4.22	–	–	–	–	–
NC Report/La Razón	1–6 Oct 2026	1,000	4.4	3.5	3.5	–	–	–	–	–	–
SocioMétrica/El Español	1–3 Oct 2026	1,000	3.2	2.8	3.0	3.0	–	2.3	–	1.8	–
Sigma Dos/El Mundo	22 Sep–1 Oct 2026	2,116	3.5	3.1	3.1	3.2	–	2.5	–	–	–
SocioMétrica/El Español	24–26 Sep 2026	1,200	3.2	2.9	3.0	3.1	–	2.2	–	1.6	–
DYM/Henneo	16–21 Sep 2026	1,017	3.2	3.0	2.9	3.0	–	2.2	–	–	–
InvyMark/laSexta	7–11 Sep 2026	1,200	4.19	3.44	3.00	–	–	–	–	–	2.66
Target Point/El Debate	9–10 Sep 2026	1,012	3.72	3.88	3.50	3.72	–	2.48	–	2.17	–
CIS	1–4 Sep 2026	4,042	3.65	4.18	3.01	3.99	–	–	–	–	–
NC Report/La Razón	1–3 Sep 2026	1,000	4.3	3.4	3.4	2.7	–	–	–	–	–
GAD3/ABC	1–3 Sep 2026	1,010	3.8	3.3	3.2	3.4	–	2.6	–	2.4	–
More in Common	24–28 Aug 2026	2,144	3.63	3.53	3.33	3.47	–	–	2.85	–	4.12
Sigma Dos/El Mundo	20–26 Aug 2026	2,173	3.4	3.0	2.9	3.0	–	2.2	–	–	–
SocioMétrica/El Español	5–6 Aug 2026	1,690	3.3	2.8	2.9	3.3	–	2.2	–	1.5	–
DYM/Henneo	15–20 Jul 2026	1,014	3.2	3.3	2.6	3.2	–	2.3	–	–	–
Sigma Dos/El Mundo	6–20 Jul 2026	3,690	3.6	3.5	3.0	3.4	–	2.6	–	–	–
Target Point/El Debate	15–17 Jul 2026	1,004	3.72	3.88	3.50	3.72	–	2.48	–	2.17	–
GESOP/Prensa Ibérica	6–9 Jul 2026	1,001	3.3	4.0	2.7	4.1	–	–	3.4	–	–
CIS	1–6 Jul 2026	4,020	3.64	4.25	2.96	4.00	–	–	–	–	–
SocioMétrica/El Español	2–4 Jul 2026	1,416	3.0	3.0	2.8	3.2	–	2.0	–	1.4	–
NC Report/La Razón	25 Jun–1 Jul 2026	1,000	4.4	3.6	3.2	2.8	–	–	–	–	–
Ipsos/La Vanguardia	16–29 Jun 2026	1,306	3.2	3.4	2.9	3.5	–	2.5	–	–	4.4
Target Point/El Debate	17–18 Jun 2026	1,022	3.66	3.77	3.40	3.73	–	2.42	–	2.22	–
Sigma Dos/El Mundo	1–11 Jun 2026	1,994	3.5	3.4	2.8	3.1	–	2.3	–	–	–
CIS	1–4 Jun 2026	4,024	3.79	4.21	2.99	4.05	–	–	–	–	–
SocioMétrica/El Español	28–30 May 2026	1,200	2.8	3.1	2.6	3.2	–	1.6	–	1.3	–
InvyMark/laSexta	25–29 May 2026	1,200	4.18	3.63	3.21	–	–	–	–	–	2.80
Target Point/El Debate	27–28 May 2026	1,007	3.20	3.49	2.87	3.37	–	2.45	–	2.23	–
GAD3/ABC	26–28 May 2026	1,011	3.8	3.5	3.1	3.6	–	2.7	–	2.1	–
NC Report/La Razón	25–27 May 2026	1,000	4.4	3.7	3.3	2.9	–	–	–	–	–
DYM/Henneo	20–22 May 2026	1,009	3.7	3.7	2.8	3.3	–	2.6	–	–	–
CIS	4–18 May 2026	4,016	3.74	4.59	2.93	4.25	–	–	–	–	–
Sigma Dos/El Mundo	24–29 Apr 2026	1,205	3.5	3.4	2.7	3.3	–	2.3	–	–	–
SocioMétrica/El Español	15–18 Apr 2026	1,712	2.7	3.0	2.5	3.1	–	1.5	–	1.2	–
CIS	6–10 Apr 2026	4,020	3.68	4.81	2.75	4.25	–	–	–	–	–
NC Report/La Razón	6–9 Apr 2026	1,000	4.3	3.9	3.3	3.0	–	–	–	–	–
Ipsos/La Vanguardia	23 Mar–8 Apr 2026	1,058	3.5	3.7	2.7	3.6	–	2.4	–	–	4.5
Sigma Dos/El Mundo	16–31 Mar 2026	1,958	3.5	3.4	2.8	3.1	–	2.3	–	–	–
Target Point/El Debate	24–26 Mar 2026	1,114	3.30	3.81	2.81	3.54	–	2.46	–	2.04	–
DYM/Henneo	19–23 Mar 2026	1,002	3.4	3.6	2.7	3.2	–	2.1	–	–	–
SocioMétrica/El Español	19–21 Mar 2026	1,100	2.7	2.8	2.8	2.9	–	1.8	–	1.8	–
CIS	2–6 Mar 2026	4,016	3.60	4.43	2.99	4.23	–	–	–	–	–
Sigma Dos/El Mundo	23–27 Feb 2026	1,969	3.5	3.3	3.1	3.3	–	2.3	–	–	–
Target Point/El Debate	17–19 Feb 2026	1,005	3.45	3.52	3.00	3.56	–	2.31	–	2.03	–
SocioMétrica/El Español	11–13 Feb 2026	1,200	2.6	2.7	2.9	3.0	–	1.9	–	1.9	–
NC Report/La Razón	10–13 Feb 2026	1,000	4.3	3.7	3.6	3.0	–	–	–	–	–
CIS	2–6 Feb 2026	4,027	3.45	4.23	2.97	3.97	–	–	–	–	–
DYM/Henneo	23–24 Jan 2026	1,003	3.0	3.2	2.7	3.2	–	2.1	–	–	–
Target Point/El Debate	13–15 Jan 2026	1,000	3.30	3.22	3.09	3.26	–	2.32	–	1.97	–
GESOP/Prensa Ibérica	12–15 Jan 2026	1,002	3.3	3.6	2.7	3.6	–	–	3.1	–	–
SocioMétrica/El Español	7–10 Jan 2026	1,300	2.6	2.7	2.9	3.2	–	2.0	–	1.3	–
CIS	5–10 Jan 2026	4,006	3.54	4.13	3.01	3.94	–	–	–	–	–
Sigma Dos/El Mundo	22–29 Dec 2025	2,182	3.5	3.4	2.9	3.3	–	2.5	–	–	–
InvyMark/laSexta	15–19 Dec 2025	?	3.75	3.55	2.88	2.92	–	–	–	–	–
SocioMétrica/El Español	5–7 Dec 2025	1,100	2.8	2.6	2.7	3.1	–	1.7	–	1.0	–
CIS	1–5 Dec 2025	4,017	3.39	4.08	2.90	4.01	–	–	–	–	–
InvyMark/laSexta	1–5 Dec 2025	?	4.21	3.64	3.06	3.05	–	–	–	–	–
40dB/Prisa	27 Nov–1 Dec 2025	2,500	3.26	3.34	3.31	3.19	–	–	2.40	–	–
DYM/Henneo	12–14 Nov 2025	1,000	3.4	3.3	3.1	3.5	–	–	–	–	–
NC Report/La Razón	11–14 Nov 2025	1,000	4.3	3.9	3.4	3.0	–	–	–	–	–
CIS	3–12 Nov 2025	4,028	3.43	4.14	2.98	3.99	–	–	–	–	–
CIS	3–11 Nov 2025	2,052	3.52	4.29	3.07	4.11	–	–	–	–	–
SocioMétrica/El Español	6–8 Nov 2025	1,100	2.8	2.5	2.7	3.0	–	1.6	–	1.2	–
SocioMétrica/El Español	6–10 Oct 2025	900	2.8	2.7	2.8	3.2	–	1.8	–	1.6	–
GESOP/Prensa Ibérica	3–9 Oct 2025	1,000	3.3	3.9	2.6	4.0	–	–	3.2	–	4.7
CIS	1–7 Oct 2025	4,029	3.46	4.44	2.89	4.24	–	–	–	–	–
NC Report/La Razón	1–4 Oct 2025	1,000	4.3	3.8	3.3	3.1	–	–	–	–	–
Sigma Dos/El Mundo	17 Sep–1 Oct 2025	2,345	3.6	3.5	3.0	3.4	–	2.6	–	–	–
InvyMark/laSexta	15–19 Sep 2025	?	4.03	3.66	2.63	2.99	–	–	–	–	–
DYM/Henneo	10–15 Sep 2025	1,016	3.4	3.4	2.8	3.5	–	–	–	–	–
Target Point/El Debate	10–11 Sep 2025	1,027	3.04	3.11	2.88	3.46	–	2.49	–	2.02	–
GAD3/ABC	5–11 Sep 2025	1,001	3.9	3.2	3.0	3.3	–	2.4	–	2.0	–
CIS	1–6 Sep 2025	4,122	3.55	4.23	2.93	4.13	–	–	–	–	–
NC Report/La Razón	1–6 Sep 2025	1,000	4.4	3.8	3.2	3.1	–	–	–	–	–
SocioMétrica/El Español	26–29 Aug 2025	1,100	3.0	2.6	2.7	3.2	–	2.0	–	1.6	–
Sigma Dos/El Mundo	21–30 Jul 2025	2,267	3.7	3.0	2.9	3.3	–	–	–	–	–
SocioMétrica/El Español	21–24 Jul 2025	1,100	2.9	2.5	2.7	3.1	–	1.9	–	1.6	–
DYM/Henneo	11–14 Jul 2025	1,000	3.6	3.0	3.3	3.4	–	2.3	–	–	–
Sigma Dos/El Mundo	8–11 Jul 2025	1,562	3.7	3.0	2.9	3.3	–	2.4	–	–	–
Target Point/El Debate	9–10 Jul 2025	1,002	3.48	3.14	3.01	3.55	–	2.53	–	1.98	–
CIS	1–7 Jul 2025	4,018	3.83	3.99	3.15	3.97	–	–	–	–	–
EM-Analytics/Electomanía	27 Jun–4 Jul 2025	1,111	3.1	3.3	2.4	2.9	–	2.0	–	0.9	–
NC Report/La Razón	19–21 Jun 2025	1,000	4.5	3.9	3.2	3.3	–	–	–	–	–
SocioMétrica/El Español	18–21 Jun 2025	1,150	3.0	2.9	2.5	3.3	–	2.0	–	1.6	–
Target Point/El Debate	18–20 Jun 2025	1,000	3.46	2.75	2.90	3.43	–	2.42	–	2.22	–
InvyMark/laSexta	16–20 Jun 2025	?	4.00	3.70	2.64	2.88	–	–	–	–	–
CIS	12–19 Jun 2025	4,004	3.46	3.98	2.91	4.01	–	–	–	–	–
DYM/Henneo	17 Jun 2025	1,042	3.4	3.1	2.7	3.4	–	2.5	–	–	–
GESOP/Prensa Ibérica	10–12 Jun 2025	1,002	3.5	3.6	2.6	3.8	–	–	3.1	–	–
CIS	2–7 Jun 2025	4,013	3.51	4.18	2.70	3.97	–	–	–	–	–
GAD3/ABC	27–29 May 2025	1,023	3.9	3.3	2.7	3.3	–	2.4	–	1.8	–
SocioMétrica/El Español	19–22 May 2025	1,812	3.1	3.3	2.3	3.1	–	1.9	–	1.4	–
Target Point/El Debate	21–23 May 2025	1,002	3.22	3.40	2.57	3.56	–	2.68	–	1.92	–
DYM/Henneo	14–19 May 2025	1,057	3.8	3.4	2.7	3.5	–	2.5	–	–	–
CIS	5–8 May 2025	4,018	3.78	4.15	2.90	3.89	–	–	–	–	–
Target Point/El Debate	23–25 Apr 2025	1,016	3.32	3.11	2.59	3.33	–	2.35	–	1.82	–
SocioMétrica/El Español	21–25 Apr 2025	1,000	3.2	3.3	2.4	3.0	–	2.1	–	1.5	–
NC Report/La Razón	14–17 Apr 2025	1,000	4.4	4.2	3.2	3.6	–	–	–	–	–
CIS	1–8 Apr 2025	4,009	3.78	4.10	2.85	3.91	–	–	–	–	–
SocioMétrica/El Español	19–21 Mar 2025	1,903	3.2	3.3	2.6	3.0	–	1.9	–	1.6	–
Target Point/El Debate	19–21 Mar 2025	1,000	3.22	3.37	2.71	3.56	–	2.47	–	1.97	–
DYM/Henneo	12–16 Mar 2025	1,001	3.6	3.3	2.5	3.1	–	–	–	–	–
NC Report/La Razón	3–7 Mar 2025	1,500	4.5	4.3	3.3	3.7	–	–	–	–	–
CIS	28 Feb–7 Mar 2025	4,018	3.78	4.12	2.77	3.88	–	–	–	–	–
GESOP/Prensa Ibérica	3–6 Mar 2025	1,000	3.5	3.6	2.5	3.8	–	–	–	–	–
Target Point/El Debate	19–21 Feb 2025	1,007	3.07	3.34	2.39	3.62	–	2.65	–	2.00	–
SocioMétrica/El Español	12–14 Feb 2025	1,812	3.3	3.2	2.8	3.4	–	2.1	–	1.9	–
NC Report/La Razón	4–7 Feb 2025	1,000	4.5	4.2	3.5	3.6	–	–	–	–	–
CIS	31 Jan–6 Feb 2025	4,042	3.61	4.13	2.85	3.96	–	–	–	–	–
Sigma Dos/El Mundo	24–31 Jan 2025	2,303	3.6	3.4	3.1	3.5	–	3.0	–	–	–
Target Point/El Debate	22–24 Jan 2025	1,001	3.02	3.33	2.50	3.62	–	2.75	–	2.00	–
DYM/Henneo	16–20 Jan 2025	1,014	3.7	3.4	2.9	3.3	–	–	–	–	–
CIS	2–9 Jan 2025	4,024	3.52	3.93	2.79	3.89	–	–	–	–	–
SocioMétrica/El Español	26–30 Dec 2024	2,953	3.4	3.2	2.9	3.7	–	–	–	2.5	–
Target Point/El Debate	26–30 Dec 2024	1,002	3.06	3.05	2.60	3.26	–	2.61	–	2.08	–
Sondaxe/La Voz de Galicia	5–11 Dec 2024	1,111	4.1	4.2	3.4	3.8	–	–	–	–	–
CIS	2–9 Dec 2024	4,621	3.64	4.00	2.87	3.92	–	–	–	–	–
GESOP/Prensa Ibérica	2–4 Dec 2024	1,001	3.7	4.1	2.7	4.4	–	–	–	–	–
NC Report/La Razón	25–29 Nov 2024	1,000	4.4	4.0	3.6	3.3	–	–	–	–	–
SocioMétrica/El Español	22–24 Nov 2024	1,227	3.6	3.3	2.9	3.8	–	–	–	2.5	–
Target Point/El Debate	20–22 Nov 2024	1,303	2.93	2.97	2.50	3.24	–	2.65	–	2.00	–
GAD3/Mediaset	11–14 Nov 2024	1,036	3.6	3.5	–	–	–	–	–	–	–
DYM/Henneo	8–11 Nov 2024	1,015	3.5	3.4	2.7	3.2	–	–	–	–	–
CIS	2–7 Nov 2024	4,010	3.43	3.86	2.66	3.68	–	–	–	–	–
GAD3/ABC	21–24 Oct 2024	1,018	4.1	3.3	2.9	3.2	–	2.3	–	2.0	–
CIS	11–21 Oct 2024	3,928	3.77	3.65	2.77	3.48	–	2.71	–	–	–
DYM/Henneo	16–18 Oct 2024	1,000	4.1	3.6	2.8	3.6	–	–	–	–	–
Target Point/El Debate	16–18 Oct 2024	1,020	3.48	3.35	2.80	3.53	–	2.55	–	2.04	–
SocioMétrica/El Español	16–18 Oct 2024	2,240	3.7	3.5	2.5	3.7	–	–	–	2.9	–
CIS	1–11 Oct 2024	4,005	4.02	4.13	2.93	3.99	–	–	–	–	–
GESOP/Prensa Ibérica	23–26 Sep 2024	1,004	3.8	3.8	2.7	4.0	–	–	–	–	–
Target Point/El Debate	18–19 Sep 2024	1,001	3.36	3.63	2.40	3.72	–	2.76	–	2.15	–
CIS	2–6 Sep 2024	4,027	3.95	4.28	2.89	4.15	–	–	–	–	–
SocioMétrica/El Español	26–31 Aug 2024	2,310	3.6	3.4	2.5	3.6	–	–	–	3.1	–
NC Report/La Razón	20–23 Aug 2024	1,000	4.5	4.0	3.4	3.5	–	–	–	–	–
Target Point/El Debate	22 Jul 2024	?	3.43	3.86	2.49	3.82	–	2.84	–	2.27	–
SocioMétrica/El Español	18–20 Jul 2024	1,200	3.6	3.5	2.7	3.7	–	–	–	3.0	–
Sigma Dos/El Mundo	12–18 Jul 2024	2,515	3.7	3.6	2.5	3.5	–	2.5	–	–	–
CIS	1–4 Jul 2024	4,007	4.04	4.32	2.88	4.09	–	–	–	–	–
Target Point/El Debate	25–27 Jun 2024	1,002	3.49	3.92	2.31	3.81	–	2.57	–	2.03	–
NC Report/La Razón	11–15 Jun 2024	1,000	4.6	4.1	3.4	3.4	–	–	–	–	–
CIS	31 May–6 Jun 2024	4,011	3.87	4.30	2.81	4.11	–	–	–	–	–
GESOP/Prensa Ibérica	27–31 May 2024	1,013	4.0	4.2	2.6	4.2	–	–	–	–	–
SocioMétrica/El Español	17–19 May 2024	519	3.7	3.8	3.0	3.9	–	–	–	–	–
CIS	3–8 May 2024	4,013	4.01	4.39	2.84	4.19	–	–	–	–	–
SocioMétrica/El Español	30 Apr–4 May 2024	1,279	3.8	3.5	3.1	4.0	–	–	–	–	–
SocioMétrica/El Español	9–12 Apr 2024	2,550	3.8	3.7	2.9	4.1	–	–	–	–	–
CIS	1–4 Apr 2024	4,032	4.14	4.22	2.81	4.07	–	–	–	–	–
NC Report/La Razón	20–27 Mar 2024	1,000	4.5	4.1	3.3	3.9	–	–	–	–	–
Sigma Dos/El Mundo	19–26 Mar 2024	1,413	3.8	3.5	2.6	3.6	–	–	–	–	–
Invymark/laSexta	18–22 Mar 2024	?	4.23	3.87	2.85	2.83	–	–	–	–	–
Sigma Dos/Antena 3	5–15 Mar 2024	2,405	3.6	3.5	2.3	3.3	–	–	–	–	–
SocioMétrica/El Español	5–9 Mar 2024	2,900	3.9	3.8	3.0	4.1	–	–	–	–	–
Target Point/El Debate	5–7 Mar 2024	1,080	3.58	3.53	2.17	3.76	–	–	–	–	–
CIS	1–5 Mar 2024	3,931	4.22	4.10	2.82	4.11	–	–	–	–	–
GAD3/ABC	26–29 Feb 2024	1,005	4.7	3.6	2.6	3.6	–	–	–	–	–
Sigma Dos/El Mundo	22–29 Feb 2024	1,632	4.0	3.5	2.8	3.5	–	–	–	–	–
GESOP/Prensa Ibérica	19–21 Feb 2024	1,004	4.3	3.9	2.5	3.9	–	–	–	–	–
SocioMétrica/El Español	5–9 Feb 2024	2,900	4.2	4.0	3.2	4.2	–	–	–	–	–
CIS	1–6 Feb 2024	3,926	4.18	4.25	2.76	4.27	–	–	–	–	–
Sigma Dos/El Mundo	26 Jan–1 Feb 2024	1,632	4.2	3.6	2.9	3.8	–	–	–	–	–
Invymark/laSexta	15–19 Jan 2024	?	4.43	4.46	2.90	3.53	–	–	–	–	–
CIS	2–5 Jan 2024	4,016	4.16	4.42	2.64	4.40	–	–	–	–	–
SocioMétrica/El Español	25–31 Dec 2023	2,309	4.0	4.3	3.2	4.5	–	–	–	–	–
Sigma Dos/El Mundo	15–26 Dec 2023	2,992	4.1	3.8	3.0	4.0	–	–	–	–	–
NC Report/La Razón	12–16 Dec 2023	1,000	4.5	4.3	3.4	4.0	–	–	–	–	–
DYM/Henneo	13–15 Dec 2023	1,011	4.0	3.7	2.7	3.8	–	–	–	–	–
Invymark/laSexta	11–15 Dec 2023	?	3.88	4.70	2.38	3.53	–	–	–	–	–
CIS	1–7 Dec 2023	4,613	4.14	4.29	2.78	4.46	–	–	–	–	–
Sigma Dos/El Mundo	27 Nov–1 Dec 2023	1,784	4.2	3.8	2.8	3.8	–	–	–	–	–
Sigma Dos/Antena 3	17–27 Nov 2023	1,654	4.2	3.9	3.0	3.7	–	–	–	–	–
SocioMétrica/El Español	20–24 Nov 2023	2,109	4.2	4.1	3.3	4.3	–	–	–	–	–
GESOP/Prensa Ibérica	21–23 Nov 2023	1,002	4.4	3.8	2.8	4.2	–	–	–	–	–
DYM/Henneo	17–18 Nov 2023	1,004	4.2	3.5	2.7	3.7	–	–	–	–	–
GAD3/Mediaset	16–17 Nov 2023	1,008	4.3	3.6	3.0	3.6	–	–	–	–	–
Invymark/laSexta	13–17 Nov 2023	?	4.24	4.48	2.81	3.59	–	–	–	–	–
CIS	31 Oct–6 Nov 2023	4,090	4.45	4.31	3.03	4.29	–	–	–	–	–
NC Report/La Razón	31 Oct–4 Nov 2023	1,000	4.5	4.3	3.3	4.0	–	–	–	–	–
Invymark/laSexta	30 Oct–3 Nov 2023	?	4.60	4.27	2.93	3.45	–	–	–	–	–
Sigma Dos/El Mundo	30 Oct–3 Nov 2023	1,788	4.2	3.8	3.1	3.9	–	–	–	–	–
GAD3/ABC	30 Oct–3 Nov 2023	1,001	4.7	4.0	2.8	3.9	–	–	–	–	–
SocioMétrica/El Español	25–27 Oct 2023	2,600	4.0	4.4	3.0	4.5	–	–	–	–	–
DYM/Henneo	18–22 Oct 2023	1,035	4.3	3.8	2.7	3.6	–	–	–	–	–
Sigma Dos/Antena 3	4–11 Oct 2023	1,440	4.4	4.2	3.2	3.9	–	–	–	–	–
CIS	2–6 Oct 2023	4,031	4.48	4.51	2.83	4.49	–	–	–	–	–
Target Point/El Debate	2–4 Oct 2023	1,003	3.39	3.80	2.51	3.55	–	–	–	–	–
Sigma Dos/El Mundo	25–28 Sep 2023	2,120	4.4	3.9	3.1	4.1	–	–	–	–	–
SocioMétrica/El Español	21–23 Sep 2023	1,429	3.9	4.5	2.9	4.4	–	–	–	–	–
DYM/Henneo	14–17 Sep 2023	1,003	4.1	3.7	2.9	3.6	–	–	–	–	–
NC Report/La Razón	28 Aug–1 Sep 2023	1,000	4.4	4.3	3.3	4.2	–	–	–	–	–
Sigma Dos/El Mundo	17–24 Aug 2023	1,933	3.8	4.3	2.8	4.5	–	–	–	–	–

== Approval ratings ==
The tables below list the public approval ratings of the leaders and leading candidates of the main political parties in Spain.

=== Alberto Núñez Feijóo ===
Polling firm/Commissioner	Fieldwork date	Sample size	Alberto Núñez Feijóo (PP)			
Polling firm/Commissioner	Fieldwork date	Sample size	check	X mark	Question	Net
SocioMétrica/El Español	1 Sep–21 Nov 2026	6,842	33.4	58.7	7.9	−25.3
Ipsos/La Vanguardia	13–20 Nov 2026	1,999	36.0	56.0	8.0	−20.0
SW Demoscopia/La Séptima	26 Oct–18 Nov 2026	10,500	41.5	?	?	−?
SW Demoscopia/La Séptima	26 Oct–17 Nov 2026	10,000	41.2	?	?	−?
SW Demoscopia/La Séptima	26 Oct–16 Nov 2026	9,500	40.8	?	?	−?
SW Demoscopia/La Séptima	26 Oct–14 Nov 2026	8,500	40.5	?	?	−?
SW Demoscopia/La Séptima	26 Oct–13 Nov 2026	8,000	40.3	?	?	−?
SW Demoscopia/La Séptima	26 Oct–12 Nov 2026	7,500	40.4	?	?	−?
SW Demoscopia/La Séptima	26 Oct–11 Nov 2026	7,000	40.4	?	?	−?
SW Demoscopia/La Séptima	26 Oct–10 Nov 2026	6,500	40.2	?	?	−?
SW Demoscopia/La Séptima	26 Oct–9 Nov 2026	6,000	39.9	?	?	−?
SocioMétrica/El Español	1 Sep–8 Nov 2026	5,460	30.5	60.8	8.7	−30.3
SW Demoscopia/La Séptima	26 Oct–7 Nov 2026	5,000	39.6	?	?	−?
SW Demoscopia/La Séptima	26 Oct–6 Nov 2026	4,500	39.6	?	?	−?
Ateneo del Dato/elDiario.es	2–5 Nov 2026	2,000	40.2	56.6	3.2	−16.4
SW Demoscopia/La Séptima	26 Oct–5 Nov 2026	4,000	39.9	?	?	−?
SW Demoscopia/La Séptima	29 Oct–4 Nov 2026	3,500	40.0	?	?	−?
SocioMétrica/El Español	1 Sep–1 Nov 2026	4,893	30.0	61.1	8.9	−31.1
SocioMétrica/El Español	1 Sep–25 Oct 2026	3,223	28.4	62.2	9.4	−33.8
Ateneo del Dato/elDiario.es	20–22 Oct 2026	2,000	38.9	56.6	4.5	−17.7
Winston/Artículo14	29 Sep–1 Oct 2026	1,201	32.0	59.0	9.0	−27.0
SocioMétrica/El Español	24–26 Sep 2026	1,200	27.8	?	?	−?
SocioMétrica/El Español	5–6 Aug 2026	1,690	28.5	?	?	−?
SocioMétrica/El Español	2–4 Jul 2026	1,416	27.5	?	?	−?
Ipsos/La Vanguardia	16–29 Jun 2026	1,306	35.0	59.0	6.0	−24.0
SocioMétrica/El Español	28–30 May 2026	1,200	26.4	?	?	−?
SocioMétrica/El Español	15–18 Apr 2026	1,712	25.6	?	?	−?
Ipsos/La Vanguardia	23 Mar–8 Apr 2026	1,058	36.0	58.0	6.0	−22.0
SocioMétrica/El Español	19–21 Mar 2026	1,100	24.1	66.6	9.3	−42.5
SocioMétrica/El Español	11–13 Feb 2026	1,200	23.8	?	?	−?
SocioMétrica/El Español	7–10 Jan 2026	1,300	24.3	?	?	−?
SocioMétrica/El Español	5–7 Dec 2025	1,100	26.0	?	?	−?
SocioMétrica/El Español	6–8 Nov 2025	1,100	26.1	?	?	−?
SocioMétrica/El Español	6–10 Oct 2025	900	25.6	?	?	−?
SocioMétrica/El Español	26–29 Aug 2025	1,100	27.6	?	?	−?
SocioMétrica/El Español	21–24 Jul 2025	1,100	25.9	?	?	−?
SocioMétrica/El Español	18–21 Jun 2025	1,150	28.3	?	?	−?
SocioMétrica/El Español	19–22 May 2025	1,812	26.8	?	?	−?
Ipsos/La Vanguardia	15–21 May 2025	2,000	26.0	62.0	12.0	−36.0
SocioMétrica/El Español	21–25 Apr 2025	1,000	28.0	?	?	−?
SocioMétrica/El Español	19–21 Mar 2025	1,903	26.2	?	?	−?
SocioMétrica/El Español	26–30 Dec 2024	2,953	26.0	?	?	−?
Target Point/El Debate	26–30 Dec 2024	1,002	32.0	?	?	−?
SocioMétrica/El Español	22–24 Nov 2024	1,227	27.5	?	?	−?
Ipsos/La Vanguardia	18–22 Nov 2024	1,178	28.0	66.0	6.0	−38.0
SocioMétrica/El Español	16–18 Oct 2024	2,240	28.5	?	?	−?
Simple Lógica/elDiario.es	1–13 Sep 2024	1,032	24.0	71.5	4.5	−47.5
SocioMétrica/El Español	26–31 Aug 2024	2,310	27.5	?	?	−?
Simple Lógica/elDiario.es	1–9 Aug 2024	1,055	24.0	71.1	4.9	−47.1
SocioMétrica/El Español	18–20 Jul 2024	1,200	28.7	?	?	−?
Simple Lógica/elDiario.es	1–10 Jul 2024	1,026	26.0	69.3	4.6	−43.3
Simple Lógica/elDiario.es	1–11 Jun 2024	1,032	28.3	67.6	4.1	−39.3
SocioMétrica/El Español	17–19 May 2024	519	29.6	?	?	−?
Simple Lógica/elDiario.es	1–9 May 2024	1,131	25.0	68.0	7.1	−43.0
SocioMétrica/El Español	30 Apr–4 May 2024	1,279	32.1	?	?	−?
SocioMétrica/El Español	9–12 Apr 2024	2,550	30.4	?	?	−?
Simple Lógica/elDiario.es	1–9 Apr 2024	1,042	26.1	69.3	4.6	−43.2
SocioMétrica/El Español	5–9 Mar 2024	2,900	32.6	?	?	−?
Simple Lógica/elDiario.es	1–8 Mar 2024	1,046	25.4	67.5	7.1	−42.1
SocioMétrica/El Español	5–9 Feb 2024	2,900	33.8	?	?	−?
Simple Lógica/elDiario.es	1–9 Feb 2024	1,018	27.3	67.4	5.2	−40.1
Simple Lógica/elDiario.es	2–9 Jan 2024	1,013	27.2	65.8	7.0	−38.6
SocioMétrica/El Español	25–31 Dec 2023	2,309	35.1	?	?	−?
Simple Lógica/elDiario.es	1–11 Dec 2023	1,003	27.7	65.8	6.5	−38.1
SocioMétrica/El Español	20–24 Nov 2023	2,109	35.8	?	?	−?
Simple Lógica/elDiario.es	2–13 Nov 2023	1,021	30.0	63.1	7.0	−33.1
Simple Lógica/elDiario.es	2–10 Oct 2023	1,010	27.7	67.2	5.1	−39.5
Simple Lógica/elDiario.es	1–7 Sep 2023	1,032	23.0	69.7	7.3	−46.7
Simple Lógica/elDiario.es	31 Jul–7 Aug 2023	1,098	24.9	70.4	4.6	−45.5

=== Pedro Sánchez ===
Polling firm/Commissioner	Fieldwork date	Sample size	Pedro Sánchez (PSOE)			
Polling firm/Commissioner	Fieldwork date	Sample size	check	X mark	Question	Net
SocioMétrica/El Español	1 Sep–21 Nov 2026	6,842	28.9	66.7	4.4	−37.8
Ipsos/La Vanguardia	13–20 Nov 2026	1,999	38.0	58.0	4.0	−20.0
SW Demoscopia/La Séptima	26 Oct–18 Nov 2026	10,500	45.9	?	?	−?
SW Demoscopia/La Séptima	26 Oct–17 Nov 2026	10,000	45.8	?	?	−?
SW Demoscopia/La Séptima	26 Oct–16 Nov 2026	9,500	45.7	?	?	−?
SocioMétrica/El Español	1 Sep–15 Nov 2026	5,923	27.5	67.7	4.8	−40.2
SW Demoscopia/La Séptima	26 Oct–14 Nov 2026	8,500	45.6	?	?	−?
SW Demoscopia/La Séptima	26 Oct–13 Nov 2026	8,000	45.5	?	?	−?
SW Demoscopia/La Séptima	26 Oct–12 Nov 2026	7,500	45.3	?	?	−?
SW Demoscopia/La Séptima	26 Oct–11 Nov 2026	7,000	45.2	?	?	−?
SW Demoscopia/La Séptima	26 Oct–10 Nov 2026	6,500	45.4	?	?	−?
SW Demoscopia/La Séptima	26 Oct–9 Nov 2026	6,000	45.5	?	?	−?
SocioMétrica/El Español	1 Sep–8 Nov 2026	5,460	27.1	68.0	4.9	−40.9
SW Demoscopia/La Séptima	26 Oct–7 Nov 2026	5,000	45.5	?	?	−?
SW Demoscopia/La Séptima	26 Oct–6 Nov 2026	4,500	45.5	?	?	−?
Ateneo del Dato/elDiario.es	2–5 Nov 2026	2,000	41.0	58.0	1.0	−17.0
SW Demoscopia/La Séptima	26 Oct–5 Nov 2026	4,000	45.0	?	?	−?
SW Demoscopia/La Séptima	29 Oct–4 Nov 2026	3,500	45.1	?	?	−?
SocioMétrica/El Español	1 Sep–1 Nov 2026	4,893	26.7	68.3	5.0	−41.6
Ateneo del Dato/elDiario.es	20–22 Oct 2026	2,000	39.9	57.7	2.4	−17.8
SocioMétrica/El Español	1–3 Oct 2026	1,000	26.9	67.4	5.7	−40.5
Winston/Artículo14	29 Sep–1 Oct 2026	1,201	31.0	62.0	7.0	−31.0
SocioMétrica/El Español	24–26 Sep 2026	1,200	26.8	67.3	5.9	−40.5
SocioMétrica/El Español	5–6 Aug 2026	1,690	26.7	?	?	−?
SocioMétrica/El Español	2–4 Jul 2026	1,416	28.5	?	?	−?
Ipsos/La Vanguardia	16–29 Jun 2026	1,306	37.0	59.0	4.0	−22.0
SocioMétrica/El Español	28–30 May 2026	1,200	30.0	?	?	−?
SocioMétrica/El Español	15–18 Apr 2026	1,712	28.4	?	?	−?
Ipsos/La Vanguardia	23 Mar–8 Apr 2026	1,058	42.0	54.0	4.0	−12.0
YouGov	11–23 Mar 2026	1,068	35.0	61.0	3.0	−26.0
SocioMétrica/El Español	19–21 Mar 2026	1,100	26.2	66.8	7.0	−40.6
YouGov	2–19 Feb 2026	1,069	32.0	66.0	2.0	−34.0
SocioMétrica/El Español	11–13 Feb 2026	1,200	25.5	?	?	−?
SocioMétrica/El Español	7–10 Jan 2026	1,300	24.9	?	?	−?
SocioMétrica/El Español	5–7 Dec 2025	1,100	25.7	69.6	4.7	−43.9
SocioMétrica/El Español	6–8 Nov 2025	1,100	25.1	68.1	6.8	−43.0
SocioMétrica/El Español	6–10 Oct 2025	900	25.4	?	?	−?
SocioMétrica/El Español	26–29 Aug 2025	1,100	24.3	71.9	3.8	−47.6
SocioMétrica/El Español	21–24 Jul 2025	1,100	23.3	?	?	−?
SocioMétrica/El Español	18–21 Jun 2025	1,150	27.2	?	?	−?
SocioMétrica/El Español	19–22 May 2025	1,812	30.4	?	?	−?
Ipsos/La Vanguardia	15–21 May 2025	2,000	36.0	58.0	6.0	−22.0
SocioMétrica/El Español	21–25 Apr 2025	1,000	30.1	?	?	−?
SocioMétrica/El Español	19–21 Mar 2025	1,903	28.2	?	?	−?
SocioMétrica/El Español	12–14 Feb 2025	1,812	27.4	?	?	−?
SocioMétrica/El Español	26–30 Dec 2024	2,953	26.2	?	?	−?
Target Point/El Debate	26–30 Dec 2024	1,002	36.2	?	?	−?
SocioMétrica/El Español	22–24 Nov 2024	1,227	26.5	?	?	−?
Ipsos/La Vanguardia	18–22 Nov 2024	1,178	31.0	66.0	3.0	−35.0
SocioMétrica/El Español	16–18 Oct 2024	2,240	28.3	?	?	−?
Simple Lógica/elDiario.es	1–13 Sep 2024	1,032	33.8	63.9	2.4	−30.1
SocioMétrica/El Español	26–31 Aug 2024	2,310	27.9	?	?	−?
Simple Lógica/elDiario.es	1–9 Aug 2024	1,055	31.6	66.2	2.3	−34.6
SocioMétrica/El Español	18–20 Jul 2024	1,200	29.1	?	?	−?
Simple Lógica/elDiario.es	1–10 Jul 2024	1,026	37.2	59.8	2.9	−22.6
Simple Lógica/elDiario.es	1–11 Jun 2024	1,032	36.4	61.3	2.2	−24.9
SocioMétrica/El Español	17–19 May 2024	519	32.3	?	?	−?
Simple Lógica/elDiario.es	1–9 May 2024	1,131	35.0	61.1	3.9	−26.1
SocioMétrica/El Español	30 Apr–4 May 2024	1,279	31.1	?	?	−?
SocioMétrica/El Español	9–12 Apr 2024	2,550	32.6	?	?	−?
Simple Lógica/elDiario.es	1–9 Apr 2024	1,042	33.8	63.2	3.0	−29.4
SocioMétrica/El Español	5–9 Mar 2024	2,900	33.8	?	?	−?
Simple Lógica/elDiario.es	1–8 Mar 2024	1,046	35.3	60.0	4.7	−24.7
SocioMétrica/El Español	5–9 Feb 2024	2,900	35.7	?	?	−?
Simple Lógica/elDiario.es	1–9 Feb 2024	1,018	34.4	61.7	3.9	−27.3
Simple Lógica/elDiario.es	2–9 Jan 2024	1,013	35.0	61.4	3.6	−26.4
SocioMétrica/El Español	25–31 Dec 2023	2,309	38.8	?	?	−?
Simple Lógica/elDiario.es	1–11 Dec 2023	1,003	37.8	59.1	3.0	−21.3
SocioMétrica/El Español	20–24 Nov 2023	2,109	40.0	?	?	−?
Simple Lógica/elDiario.es	2–13 Nov 2023	1,021	35.2	61.9	2.9	−26.7
Simple Lógica/elDiario.es	2–10 Oct 2023	1,010	41.4	55.6	2.9	−14.2
Simple Lógica/elDiario.es	1–7 Sep 2023	1,032	42.4	53.7	3.9	−11.3
Simple Lógica/elDiario.es	31 Jul–7 Aug 2023	1,098	47.1	50.6	2.3	−3.5

=== Santiago Abascal ===
Polling firm/Commissioner	Fieldwork date	Sample size	Santiago Abascal (Vox)			
Polling firm/Commissioner	Fieldwork date	Sample size	check	X mark	Question	Net
SocioMétrica/El Español	1 Sep–21 Nov 2026	6,842	31.1	61.6	7.3	−30.5
Ipsos/La Vanguardia	13–20 Nov 2026	1,999	32.0	60.0	8.0	−28.0
SW Demoscopia/La Séptima	26 Oct–18 Nov 2026	10,500	34.3	?	?	−?
SW Demoscopia/La Séptima	26 Oct–17 Nov 2026	10,000	34.1	?	?	−?
SW Demoscopia/La Séptima	26 Oct–16 Nov 2026	9,500	34.1	?	?	−?
SW Demoscopia/La Séptima	26 Oct–14 Nov 2026	8,500	34.0	?	?	−?
SW Demoscopia/La Séptima	26 Oct–13 Nov 2026	8,000	33.9	?	?	−?
SW Demoscopia/La Séptima	26 Oct–12 Nov 2026	7,500	34.0	?	?	−?
SW Demoscopia/La Séptima	26 Oct–11 Nov 2026	7,000	34.1	?	?	−?
SW Demoscopia/La Séptima	26 Oct–10 Nov 2026	6,500	33.9	?	?	−?
SW Demoscopia/La Séptima	26 Oct–9 Nov 2026	6,000	33.6	?	?	−?
SocioMétrica/El Español	1 Sep–8 Nov 2026	5,460	29.5	62.5	8.0	−33.0
SW Demoscopia/La Séptima	26 Oct–7 Nov 2026	5,000	33.7	?	?	−?
SW Demoscopia/La Séptima	26 Oct–6 Nov 2026	4,500	33.6	?	?	−?
Ateneo del Dato/elDiario.es	2–5 Nov 2026	2,000	38.9	58.7	2.4	−19.8
SW Demoscopia/La Séptima	26 Oct–5 Nov 2026	4,000	33.7	?	?	−?
SW Demoscopia/La Séptima	29 Oct–4 Nov 2026	3,500	33.6	?	?	−?
SocioMétrica/El Español	1 Sep–1 Nov 2026	4,893	29.3	62.6	8.1	−33.3
SocioMétrica/El Español	1 Sep–25 Oct 2026	3,223	27.7	63.2	9.1	−35.5
Ateneo del Dato/elDiario.es	20–22 Oct 2026	2,000	39.0	56.3	4.7	−17.3
Winston/Artículo14	29 Sep–1 Oct 2026	1,201	29.0	63.0	8.0	−34.0
SocioMétrica/El Español	24–26 Sep 2026	1,200	25.8	?	?	−?
SocioMétrica/El Español	5–6 Aug 2026	1,690	25.8	?	?	−?
SocioMétrica/El Español	2–4 Jul 2026	1,416	25.9	?	?	−?
Ipsos/La Vanguardia	16–29 Jun 2026	1,306	32.0	63.0	5.0	−31.0
SocioMétrica/El Español	28–30 May 2026	1,200	25.1	?	?	−?
SocioMétrica/El Español	15–18 Apr 2026	1,712	24.3	?	?	−?
Ipsos/La Vanguardia	23 Mar–8 Apr 2026	1,058	28.0	65.0	7.0	−37.0
SocioMétrica/El Español	19–21 Mar 2026	1,100	25.5	67.7	6.8	−42.2
SocioMétrica/El Español	11–13 Feb 2026	1,200	26.1	?	?	−?
SocioMétrica/El Español	7–10 Jan 2026	1,300	28.2	?	?	−?
SocioMétrica/El Español	5–7 Dec 2025	1,100	26.6	?	?	−?
SocioMétrica/El Español	6–8 Nov 2025	1,100	25.2	?	?	−?
SocioMétrica/El Español	6–10 Oct 2025	900	24.7	?	?	−?
SocioMétrica/El Español	26–29 Aug 2025	1,100	23.9	?	?	−?
SocioMétrica/El Español	21–24 Jul 2025	1,100	24.0	?	?	−?
SocioMétrica/El Español	18–21 Jun 2025	1,150	23.0	?	?	−?
SocioMétrica/El Español	19–22 May 2025	1,812	20.5	?	?	−?
Ipsos/La Vanguardia	15–21 May 2025	2,000	20.0	70.0	11.0	−50.0
SocioMétrica/El Español	21–25 Apr 2025	1,000	20.8	?	?	−?
SocioMétrica/El Español	19–21 Mar 2025	1,903	21.6	?	?	−?
SocioMétrica/El Español	26–30 Dec 2024	2,953	21.7	?	?	−?
Target Point/El Debate	26–30 Dec 2024	1,002	28.1	?	?	−?
SocioMétrica/El Español	22–24 Nov 2024	1,227	22.7	?	?	−?
Ipsos/La Vanguardia	18–22 Nov 2024	1,178	19.0	72.0	9.0	−53.0
SocioMétrica/El Español	16–18 Oct 2024	2,240	19.5	?	?	−?
Simple Lógica/elDiario.es	1–13 Sep 2024	1,032	15.6	80.6	3.8	−65.0
SocioMétrica/El Español	26–31 Aug 2024	2,310	19.3	?	?	−?
Simple Lógica/elDiario.es	1–9 Aug 2024	1,055	14.6	81.2	4.2	−66.6
SocioMétrica/El Español	18–20 Jul 2024	1,200	20.5	?	?	−?
Simple Lógica/elDiario.es	1–10 Jul 2024	1,026	15.3	80.8	3.9	−65.5
Simple Lógica/elDiario.es	1–11 Jun 2024	1,032	17.4	78.2	4.4	−60.8
SocioMétrica/El Español	17–19 May 2024	519	23.6	?	?	−?
Simple Lógica/elDiario.es	1–9 May 2024	1,131	17.3	77.1	5.5	−59.8
SocioMétrica/El Español	30 Apr–4 May 2024	1,279	25.4	?	?	−?
SocioMétrica/El Español	9–12 Apr 2024	2,550	24.2	?	?	−?
Simple Lógica/elDiario.es	1–9 Apr 2024	1,042	13.5	81.7	4.9	−68.2
SocioMétrica/El Español	5–9 Mar 2024	2,900	25.3	?	?	−?
SocioMétrica/El Español	5–9 Feb 2024	2,900	26.6	?	?	−?
Simple Lógica/elDiario.es	1–8 Mar 2024	1,046	14.7	79.4	5.9	−64.7
Simple Lógica/elDiario.es	1–9 Feb 2024	1,018	17.4	78.4	4.2	−61.0
Simple Lógica/elDiario.es	2–9 Jan 2024	1,013	14.2	79.6	6.2	−65.4
SocioMétrica/El Español	25–31 Dec 2023	2,309	26.8	?	?	−?
Simple Lógica/elDiario.es	1–11 Dec 2023	1,003	15.7	78.6	5.7	−62.9
SocioMétrica/El Español	20–24 Nov 2023	2,109	27.3	?	?	−?
Simple Lógica/elDiario.es	2–13 Nov 2023	1,021	15.8	80.7	3.5	−64.9
Simple Lógica/elDiario.es	2–10 Oct 2023	1,010	15.6	80.4	4.0	−64.8
Simple Lógica/elDiario.es	1–7 Sep 2023	1,032	14.4	78.9	6.7	−64.5
Simple Lógica/elDiario.es	31 Jul–7 Aug 2023	1,098	13.2	82.5	4.4	−69.3

=== Ada Colau ===
Polling firm/Commissioner	Fieldwork date	Sample size	Ada Colau (FA)			
Polling firm/Commissioner	Fieldwork date	Sample size	check	X mark	Question	Net
SocioMétrica/El Español	1 Sep–21 Nov 2026	6,842	21.8	64.4	13.8	−42.6
Ipsos/La Vanguardia	13–20 Nov 2026	1,999	27.0	57.0	16.0	−30.0
SW Demoscopia/La Séptima	26 Oct–18 Nov 2026	10,500	33.7	?	?	−?
SW Demoscopia/La Séptima	26 Oct–17 Nov 2026	10,000	33.6	?	?	−?
SW Demoscopia/La Séptima	26 Oct–16 Nov 2026	9,500	33.4	?	?	−?
SW Demoscopia/La Séptima	26 Oct–14 Nov 2026	8,500	33.2	?	?	−?
SW Demoscopia/La Séptima	26 Oct–13 Nov 2026	8,000	33.0	?	?	−?
SW Demoscopia/La Séptima	26 Oct–12 Nov 2026	7,500	32.6	?	?	−?
SW Demoscopia/La Séptima	26 Oct–11 Nov 2026	7,000	32.4	?	?	−?
SW Demoscopia/La Séptima	26 Oct–10 Nov 2026	6,500	32.4	?	?	−?
SW Demoscopia/La Séptima	26 Oct–9 Nov 2026	6,000	32.7	?	?	−?
SocioMétrica/El Español	1 Sep–8 Nov 2026	5,460	20.7	64.9	14.4	−44.2
SW Demoscopia/La Séptima	26 Oct–7 Nov 2026	5,000	32.6	?	?	−?
SW Demoscopia/La Séptima	26 Oct–6 Nov 2026	4,500	32.6	?	?	−?
Ateneo del Dato/elDiario.es	2–5 Nov 2026	2,000	34.1	58.8	7.1	−24.7
SW Demoscopia/La Séptima	26 Oct–5 Nov 2026	4,000	32.3	?	?	−?
SW Demoscopia/La Séptima	29 Oct–4 Nov 2026	3,500	32.2	?	?	−?
SocioMétrica/El Español	1 Sep–1 Nov 2026	4,893	20.0	65.4	14.5	−45.4
Ateneo del Dato/elDiario.es	20–22 Oct 2026	2,000	29.2	61.8	9.0	−32.6

=== Yolanda Díaz ===
Polling firm/Commissioner	Fieldwork date	Sample size	Yolanda Díaz (Sumar)			
Polling firm/Commissioner	Fieldwork date	Sample size	check	X mark	Question	Net
SocioMétrica/El Español	24–26 Sep 2026	1,200	26.7	?	?	−?
SocioMétrica/El Español	5–6 Aug 2026	1,690	28.9	?	?	−?
SocioMétrica/El Español	2–4 Jul 2026	1,416	29.6	?	?	−?
Ipsos/La Vanguardia	16–29 Jun 2026	1,306	39.0	54.0	7.0	−15.0
SocioMétrica/El Español	28–30 May 2026	1,200	28.2	?	?	−?
SocioMétrica/El Español	15–18 Apr 2026	1,712	26.4	?	?	−?
Ipsos/La Vanguardia	23 Mar–8 Apr 2026	1,058	39.0	53.0	8.0	−14.0
SocioMétrica/El Español	19–21 Mar 2026	1,100	25.5	66.6	7.9	−41.1
SocioMétrica/El Español	11–13 Feb 2026	1,200	27.3	?	?	−?
SocioMétrica/El Español	7–10 Jan 2026	1,300	30.0	?	?	−?
SocioMétrica/El Español	5–7 Dec 2025	1,100	28.3	?	?	−?
SocioMétrica/El Español	6–8 Nov 2025	1,100	28.5	?	?	−?
SocioMétrica/El Español	6–10 Oct 2025	900	28.2	?	?	−?
SocioMétrica/El Español	26–29 Aug 2025	1,100	28.2	?	?	−?
SocioMétrica/El Español	21–24 Jul 2025	1,100	27.4	?	?	−?
SocioMétrica/El Español	18–21 Jun 2025	1,150	28.1	?	?	−?
SocioMétrica/El Español	19–22 May 2025	1,812	27.1	?	?	−?
Ipsos/La Vanguardia	15–21 May 2025	2,000	35.0	56.0	10.0	−21.0
SocioMétrica/El Español	21–25 Apr 2025	1,000	26.0	?	?	−?
SocioMétrica/El Español	19–21 Mar 2025	1,903	25.3	?	?	−?
SocioMétrica/El Español	26–30 Dec 2024	2,953	28.7	?	?	−?
Target Point/El Debate	26–30 Dec 2024	1,002	36.4	?	?	−?
SocioMétrica/El Español	22–24 Nov 2024	1,227	30.0	?	?	−?
Ipsos/La Vanguardia	18–22 Nov 2024	1,178	32.0	62.0	6.0	−30.0
SocioMétrica/El Español	16–18 Oct 2024	2,240	28.8	?	?	−?
Simple Lógica/elDiario.es	1–13 Sep 2024	1,032	30.6	64.7	4.6	−34.1
SocioMétrica/El Español	26–31 Aug 2024	2,310	28.1	?	?	−?
Simple Lógica/elDiario.es	1–9 Aug 2024	1,055	29.7	65.7	4.6	−36.0
SocioMétrica/El Español	18–20 Jul 2024	1,200	28.8	?	?	−?
Simple Lógica/elDiario.es	1–10 Jul 2024	1,026	33.9	61.4	4.6	−27.5
Simple Lógica/elDiario.es	1–11 Jun 2024	1,032	33.2	62.8	4.0	−29.6
SocioMétrica/El Español	17–19 May 2024	519	31.0	?	?	−?
Simple Lógica/elDiario.es	1–9 May 2024	1,131	32.9	61.0	6.1	−28.1
SocioMétrica/El Español	30 Apr–4 May 2024	1,279	33.4	?	?	−?
SocioMétrica/El Español	9–12 Apr 2024	2,550	34.3	?	?	−?
Simple Lógica/elDiario.es	1–9 Apr 2024	1,042	32.7	62.1	5.1	−29.4
SocioMétrica/El Español	5–9 Mar 2024	2,900	33.0	?	?	−?
Simple Lógica/elDiario.es	1–8 Mar 2024	1,046	34.2	58.9	6.9	−24.7
SocioMétrica/El Español	5–9 Feb 2024	2,900	33.1	?	?	−?
Simple Lógica/elDiario.es	1–9 Feb 2024	1,018	33.7	61.1	5.2	−27.4
Simple Lógica/elDiario.es	2–9 Jan 2024	1,013	34.0	58.4	7.6	−24.4
SocioMétrica/El Español	25–31 Dec 2023	2,309	39.3	?	?	−?
Simple Lógica/elDiario.es	1–11 Dec 2023	1,003	36.1	57.5	6.4	−21.4
SocioMétrica/El Español	20–24 Nov 2023	2,109	39.6	?	?	−?
Simple Lógica/elDiario.es	2–13 Nov 2023	1,021	35.3	59.0	5.7	−23.7
Simple Lógica/elDiario.es	2–10 Oct 2023	1,010	40.0	55.1	4.9	−15.1
Simple Lógica/elDiario.es	1–7 Sep 2023	1,032	40.3	53.0	6.7	−12.7
Simple Lógica/elDiario.es	31 Jul–7 Aug 2023	1,098	47.0	48.1	4.8	−1.1

=== Irene Montero ===
Polling firm/Commissioner	Fieldwork date	Sample size	Irene Montero (Podemos)			
Polling firm/Commissioner	Fieldwork date	Sample size	check	X mark	Question	Net
SocioMétrica/El Español	1 Sep–21 Nov 2026	6,842	16.8	73.5	9.7	−56.7
Ipsos/La Vanguardia	13–20 Nov 2026	1,999	21.0	68.0	11.0	−47.0
SocioMétrica/El Español	1 Sep–15 Nov 2026	5,923	16.5	73.4	10.1	−56.9
SocioMétrica/El Español	1 Sep–8 Nov 2026	5,460	16.6	73.0	10.4	−56.4
Ateneo del Dato/elDiario.es	2–5 Nov 2026	2,000	29.7	65.9	4.4	−36.2
SocioMétrica/El Español	1 Sep–1 Nov 2026	4,893	16.5	73.1	10.4	−56.6
Ateneo del Dato/elDiario.es	20–22 Oct 2026	2,000	24.3	68.8	6.9	−44.5
Winston/Artículo14	29 Sep–1 Oct 2026	1,201	23.0	68.0	9.0	−45.0

=== Ione Belarra ===
Polling firm/Commissioner	Fieldwork date	Sample size	Ione Belarra (Podemos)			
Polling firm/Commissioner	Fieldwork date	Sample size	check	X mark	Question	Net
SocioMétrica/El Español	24–26 Sep 2026	1,200	17.9	?	?	−?
SocioMétrica/El Español	5–6 Aug 2026	1,690	17.9	?	?	−?
SocioMétrica/El Español	2–4 Jul 2026	1,416	16.9	?	?	−?
Ipsos/La Vanguardia	16–29 Jun 2026	1,306	21.0	59.0	20.0	−38.0
SocioMétrica/El Español	28–30 May 2026	1,200	14.9	?	?	−?
SocioMétrica/El Español	15–18 Apr 2026	1,712	14.0	?	?	−?
Ipsos/La Vanguardia	23 Mar–8 Apr 2026	1,058	20.0	61.0	19.0	−41.0
SocioMétrica/El Español	19–21 Mar 2026	1,100	13.0	68.9	18.1	−55.9
SocioMétrica/El Español	11–13 Feb 2026	1,200	13.7	?	?	−?
SocioMétrica/El Español	7–10 Jan 2026	1,300	15.7	?	?	−?
SocioMétrica/El Español	6–8 Nov 2025	1,100	13.8	?	?	−?
SocioMétrica/El Español	6–10 Oct 2025	900	12.1	?	?	−?
SocioMétrica/El Español	26–29 Aug 2025	1,100	14.5	?	?	−?
SocioMétrica/El Español	21–24 Jul 2025	1,100	14.0	?	?	−?
SocioMétrica/El Español	18–21 Jun 2025	1,150	14.5	?	?	−?
SocioMétrica/El Español	19–22 May 2025	1,812	13.4	?	?	−?
Ipsos/La Vanguardia	15–21 May 2025	2,000	15.0	61.0	24.0	−46.0
SocioMétrica/El Español	21–25 Apr 2025	1,000	13.1	?	?	−?
SocioMétrica/El Español	19–21 Mar 2025	1,903	12.2	?	?	−?
Target Point/El Debate	26–30 Dec 2024	1,002	21.0	?	?	−?
Simple Lógica/elDiario.es	1–13 Sep 2024	1,032	16.6	68.3	15.2	−51.7
Simple Lógica/elDiario.es	1–9 Aug 2024	1,055	14.6	71.5	13.9	−56.9
Simple Lógica/elDiario.es	1–10 Jul 2024	1,026	17.1	70.5	12.4	−53.4
Simple Lógica/elDiario.es	1–11 Jun 2024	1,032	15.5	70.3	14.1	−54.8

=== Alvise Pérez ===
Polling firm/Commissioner	Fieldwork date	Sample size	Alvise Pérez (SALF)			
Polling firm/Commissioner	Fieldwork date	Sample size	check	X mark	Question	Net
SocioMétrica/El Español	1 Sep–21 Nov 2026	6,842	10.8	60.4	28.8	−49.6
SocioMétrica/El Español	1 Sep–8 Nov 2026	5,460	10.1	60.6	29.3	−50.5
SocioMétrica/El Español	1 Sep–1 Nov 2026	4,893	10.0	61.0	28.9	−51.0
SocioMétrica/El Español	24–26 Sep 2026	1,200	8.7	?	?	−?
SocioMétrica/El Español	5–6 Aug 2026	1,690	9.1	?	?	−?
SocioMétrica/El Español	2–4 Jul 2026	1,416	11.1	?	?	−?
SocioMétrica/El Español	28–30 May 2026	1,200	11.4	?	?	−?
SocioMétrica/El Español	15–18 Apr 2026	1,712	10.5	?	?	−?
SocioMétrica/El Español	19–21 Mar 2026	1,100	9.3	64.3	26.4	−55.0
SocioMétrica/El Español	11–13 Feb 2026	1,200	10.9	?	?	−?
SocioMétrica/El Español	7–10 Jan 2026	1,300	10.3	?	?	−?
SocioMétrica/El Español	6–8 Nov 2025	1,100	8.9	?	?	−?
SocioMétrica/El Español	6–10 Oct 2025	900	8.9	?	?	−?
SocioMétrica/El Español	26–29 Aug 2025	1,100	9.2	?	?	−?
SocioMétrica/El Español	21–24 Jul 2025	1,100	9.5	?	?	−?
SocioMétrica/El Español	18–21 Jun 2025	1,150	9.3	?	?	−?
SocioMétrica/El Español	19–22 May 2025	1,812	8.7	?	?	−?
SocioMétrica/El Español	19–21 Mar 2025	1,903	8.1	?	?	−?
SocioMétrica/El Español	26–30 Dec 2024	2,953	8.7	?	?	−?
Target Point/El Debate	26–30 Dec 2024	1,002	15.5	?	?	−?
SocioMétrica/El Español	22–24 Nov 2024	1,227	9.2	?	?	−?
SocioMétrica/El Español	16–18 Oct 2024	2,240	11.0	?	?	−?
Simple Lógica/elDiario.es	1–13 Sep 2024	1,032	10.2	65.4	24.3	−55.2
SocioMétrica/El Español	26–31 Aug 2024	2,310	11.8	?	?	−?
Simple Lógica/elDiario.es	1–9 Aug 2024	1,055	11.6	62.5	25.9	−50.9
SocioMétrica/El Español	18–20 Jul 2024	1,200	12.1	?	?	−?

=== Gabriel Rufián ===
Polling firm/Commissioner	Fieldwork date	Sample size	Gabriel Rufián (ERC)			
Polling firm/Commissioner	Fieldwork date	Sample size	check	X mark	Question	Net
Ipsos/La Vanguardia	13–20 Nov 2026	1,999	44.0	46.0	10.0	−2.0
Ateneo del Dato/elDiario.es	20–22 Oct 2026	2,000	52.2	42.0	5.8	+10.2
Ipsos/La Vanguardia	16–29 Jun 2026	1,306	46.0	45.0	9.0	+1.0
Ipsos/La Vanguardia	23 Mar–8 Apr 2026	1,058	46.0	44.0	10.0	+2.0
