= Nora Junco =

Spanish politician

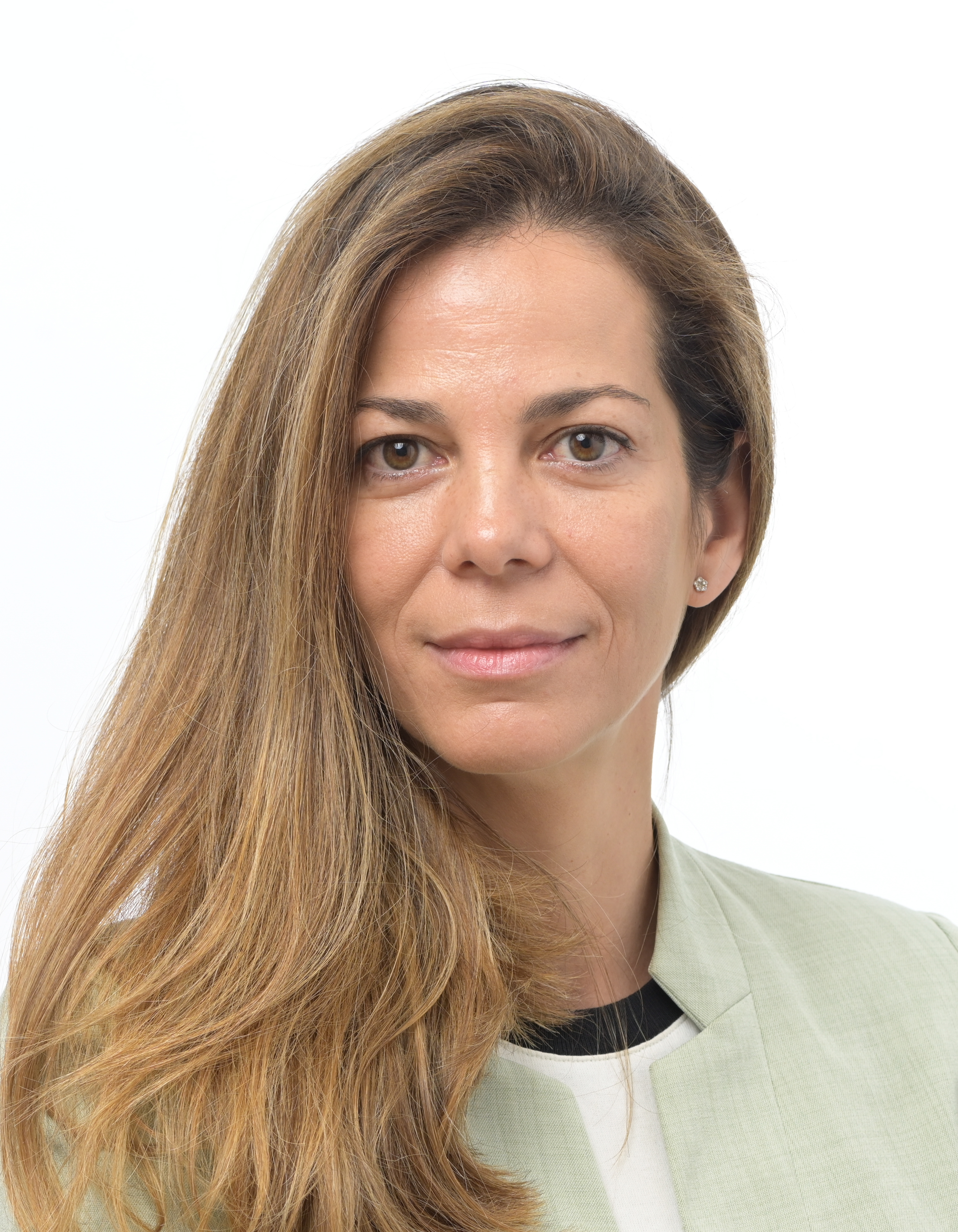
MEP Nora Junco

Nora Junco García (Spanish pronunciation: [ˈnoɾa ˈxuŋko]; born 1975) is a Spanish politician who was elected to the European Parliament in 2024 through an independent electoral list under the name Se Acabó La Fiesta (SALF), separating herself from SALF before it became a national party.

== Biography ==
Various media outlets reported that little was known of Junco before her election. LaSexta mentioned that it was unusual that she and Diego Solier had managed to be elected without any publicity or campaigning.

La Razón found that Junco had been the sole administrator of four companies between 2022 and 2024, in fields including housing, hotels, events and social media marketing. She was succeeded at one company by another member of the SALF list, and succeeded another member of the list at another company.

Junco said in 2025 that she knew SALF founder Alvise Pérez through friends and helped organise his party and campaign, believing in his message of anti-corruption. In December 2024, Junco and Solier were admitted to the European Conservatives and Reformists Group (ECR) in the European Parliament, while Pérez remained in the non-attached members, having also applied for the ECR. By June 2025, the pair had severed their links with Pérez and SALF. In October 2025, the Supreme Court of Spain opened an investigation into the alleged harassment and disclosure of private information by Pérez against Junco and Solier.
