= Diego Solier =

Spanish politician

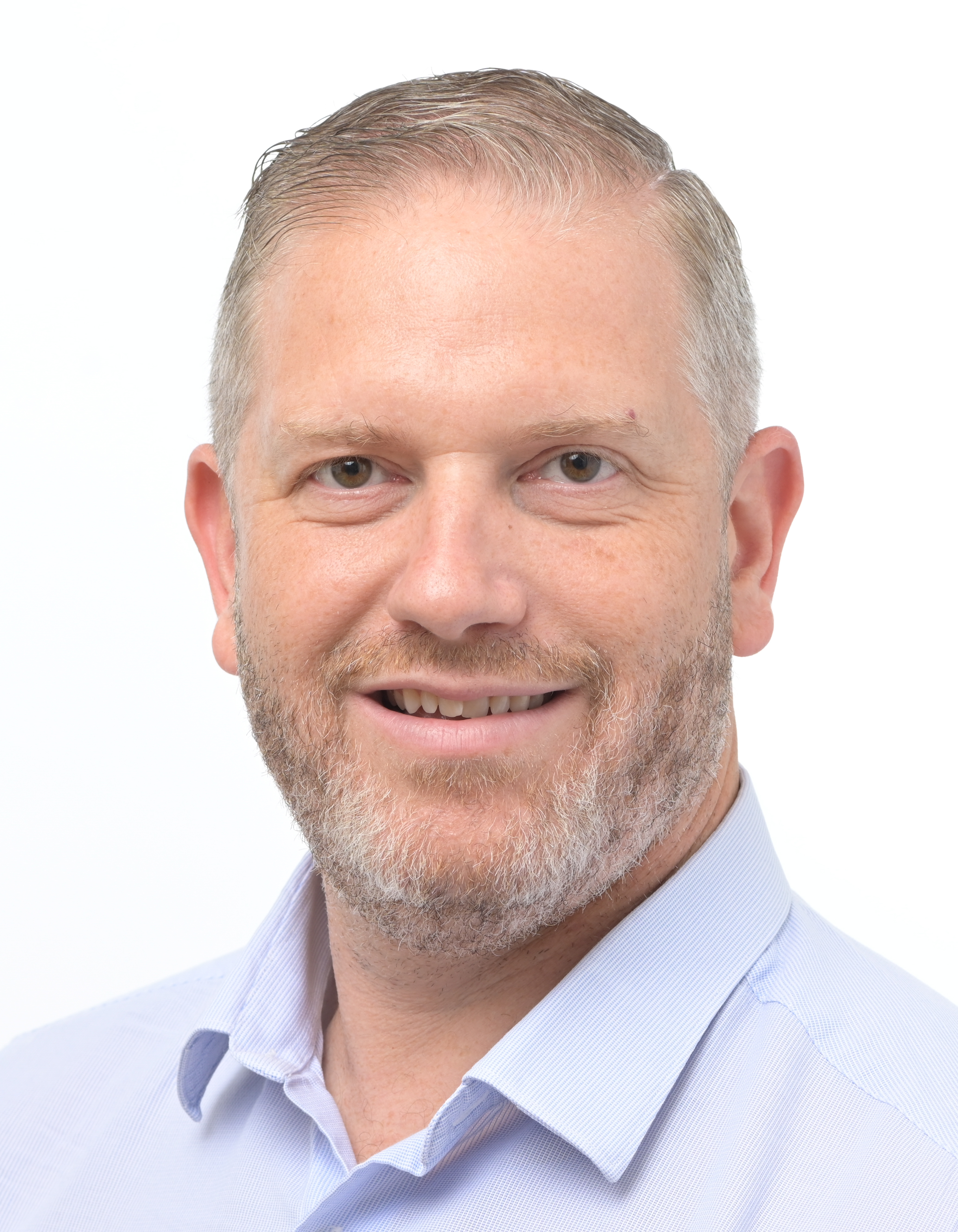
MEP Diego Solier

Diego Solier Fernández (Spanish pronunciation: [ˈdjeɣo soˈljeɾ]; born 26 April 1980) is a Spanish politician who was elected to the European Parliament in 2024 as a member of the electoral list Se Acabó La Fiesta (SALF). Prior to his election, he worked in information technology for corporations in Spain and Ireland.

== Early life and business career ==
Various media outlets reported that little was known of Solier before his election to the European Parliament, similar to Nora Junco who was also elected on the Se Acabó La Fiesta (SALF) list. He was born in Valencia and qualified as a systems engineer at the Technical University of Valencia, where he also obtained a Master of Business Administration.

Solier worked for several years in Dublin for Trinity Biotech, the Irish Medicines Board and Irish Continental Group. From 2012 to 2018, he was the head of IT systems for The Walt Disney Company in the Iberian Peninsula before moving to an IT Director role in Attindas, a global personal care company. According to his LinkedIn profile, he was employed at the company when he was elected.

He is considered to be in line with initiatives from Vox politicians Santiago Abascal and Javier Ortega Smith, as well as Isabel Díaz Ayuso of the People's Party, whom he wanted to be the next prime minister of Spain. He also wrote statements supporting certain aspects of foreign politicians activities like Donald Trump, Javier Milei and Nayib Bukele.

== Political career ==
Solier ran second on the SALF list for the 2024 European Parliament election in Spain, which had three members elected. He met Alvise Pérez days before the election. Solier was aware of Pérez through his online personality and supported his aim of opposing corruption.

In December 2024, Junco and Solier were admitted to the European Conservatives and Reformists Group (ECR) in the European Parliament, while Pérez remained in the non-attached members, having also applied for the ECR. By June 2025, the pair had severed their links with Pérez and SALF. In October 2025, the Supreme Court of Spain opened an investigation into the alleged harassment and disclosure of private information by Pérez against Junco and Solier.
