= Alvise Pérez =

Spanish social media personality and politician (born 1990)

Alvise Pérez MEP
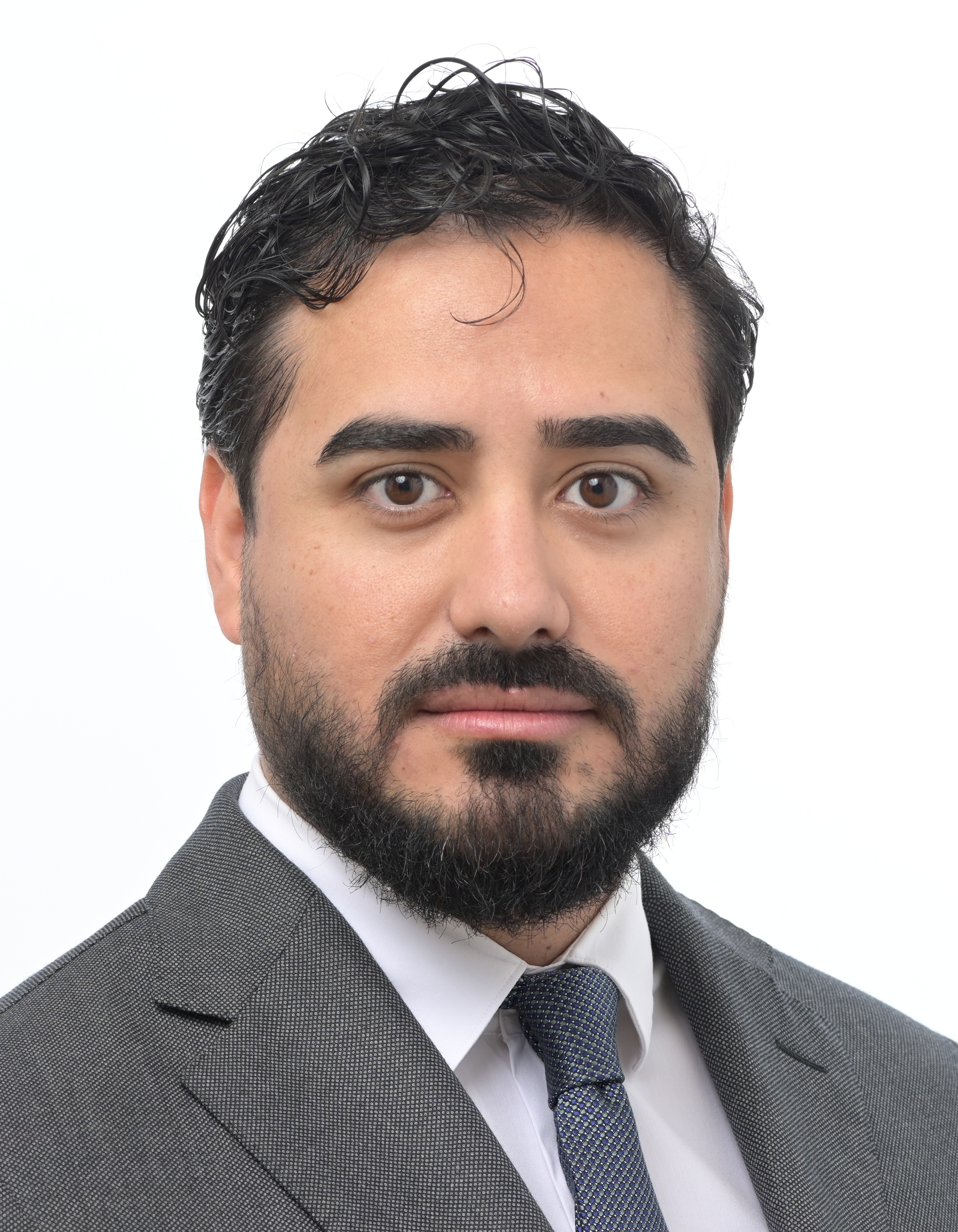
- Official portrait, 2024

Member of the European Parliament for Spain
- Incumbent
- Assumed office 16 July 2024

President of SALF
- Incumbent
- Assumed office 30 April 2024
- Preceded by: Office established

Personal details
- Born: Luis Pérez Fernández; 26 February 1990 (age 36) Seville, Spain
- Party: SALF (since 2024)
- Other political affiliations: Citizens (2017–2019); UPyD (2011–2016); Liberal Democrats (2010s)
- Education: National University of Distance Education (dropped out); University of Leeds (dropped out)
- Occupation: Political advisor; influencer

Luis "Alvise" Pérez Fernández (Spanish pronunciation: [alˈβise ˈpeɾeθ]; born 26 February 1990) is a Spanish social media personality, politician, and political advisor. He is the founder and leader of Se Acabó La Fiesta, a political party that obtained 3 seats in the 2024 European Parliament election in Spain.

A former member of Union, Progress and Democracy, during his time in England he was a member of the Liberal Democrats. Back in Spain, he joined Citizens (Cs) and served as chief of staff of Toni Cantó, leader of Cs in the Valencian Community. In 2019, he was dismissed and left Cs over controversial statements he had made on Twitter. Since the COVID-19 pandemic, he has become a leading figure of the alt-right movement in Spain thanks to his activity on social networks, which consists of publishing information about alleged illegalities committed by Spanish left-wing politicians and journalists. Some of those exclusives have turned out to be fake news, which has led him to be sued and fined several times, whereas other trials have resulted in his acquittal.

The Spanish Supreme Court has opened four cases against him, including for alleged illegal funding and for harassing the two EU lawmakers elected under his movement in 2024, who have since broken with him. In 2025, the European Parliament started the process to revoke his parliamentary immunity.

== Early life ==
Luis Pérez Fernández was born on 26 February 1990 in Seville, the youngest of four children. His father was a local businessman and his mother a housewife. He goes by the pseudonym "Alvise", which means Luis in the Venetian language. After finishing secondary school, he had to take care of his ill grandmother, which forced him to attend the National University of Distance Education. He enrolled for a double degree in Political Science and Public Administration, from which he dropped out a year and a half later. In 2011, he joined the centrist Union, Progress and Democracy (UPyD) and held some minor responsibilities in the regional branch of Andalusia.

In early 2012, at 22 years of age, Pérez moved to Leeds with his girlfriend and for a time worked as a dishwasher. He later worked as online community manager for the Cervantes Institute while studying a degree in Philosophy, Politics and Economics at the University of Leeds. Eventually, he left UPyD and joined the Liberal Youth, the youth wing of the Liberal Democrats, a political party in the United Kingdom. He claimed to be the first ever Spanish delegate at the International Federation of Liberal Youth general assembly not to be a member of a Catalan nationalist party.

== Political career ==
=== Career in Citizens ===
In late 2017, Pérez joined Citizens (Cs) attracted by the proposals of its leader Albert Rivera. Fellow former member of UPyD Toni Cantó, at the time a member of the Congress of Deputies, encouraged Pérez to return to Spain to be his campaign manager in the 2019 Valencian regional election. After passing a selection process, Pérez moved to Valencia in December 2018 and dropped out of university to start working as chief of staff of Cs at the Corts Valencianes.

Following the election, Pérez became criticized within the parliamentary group of Cs over the dismissal of some employees and his controversial statements on immigration and violence against women. In July 2019, Pérez drew attention over his insults against left-wing politicians and allegedly Islamophobic commentaries on Twitter. After Cs' collapse in the November 2019 Spanish general election, Pérez was dismissed as the chief of staff of Cantó, having served for less than a year. Shortly after, Pérez resigned from the remaining of his positions and left Cs due to its "turn to the centre-left". Subsequently, he moved to Madrid and announced being working on a new private project.

=== Political activism ===
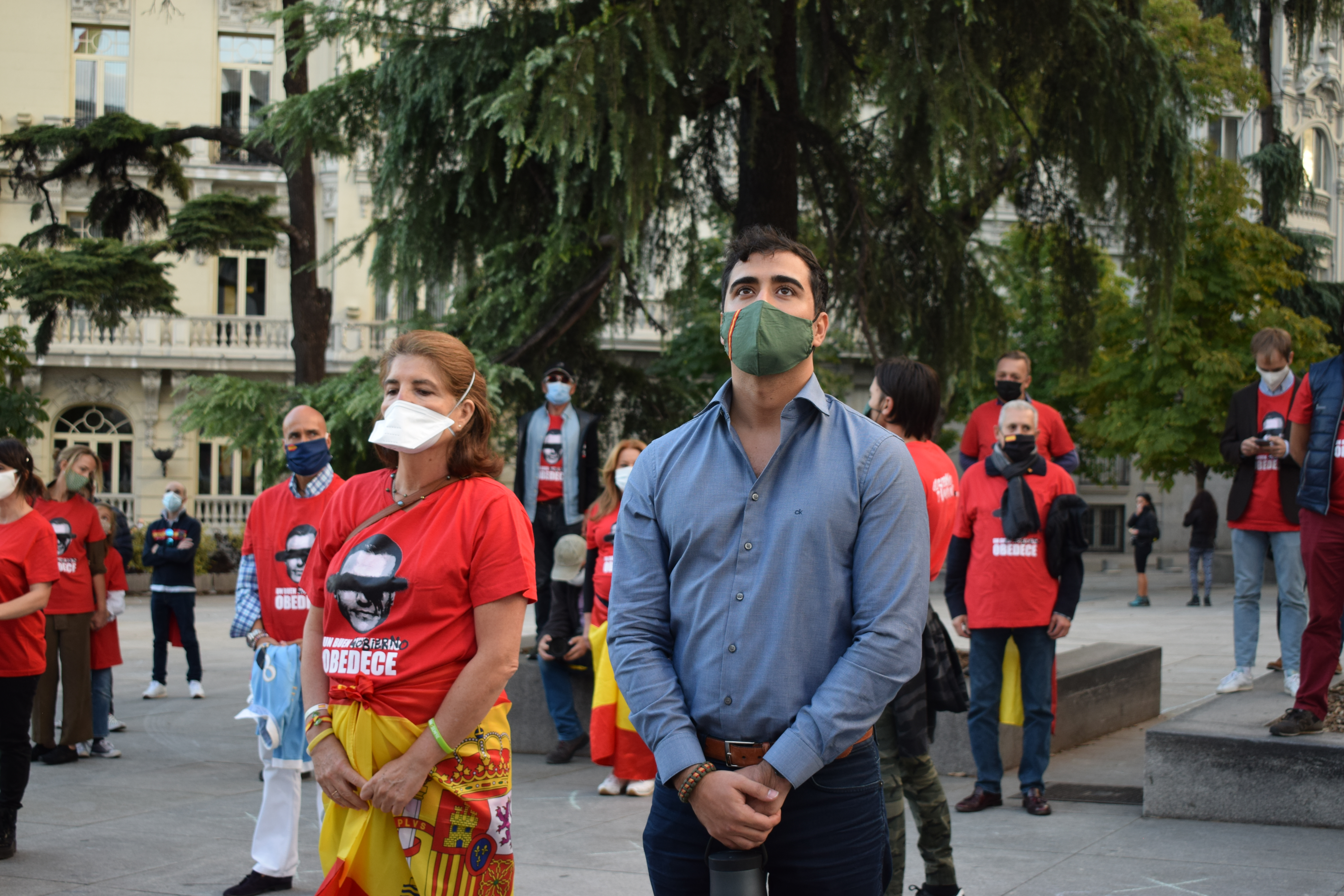
Pérez wearing a face mask in a rally against the government's management of the COVID-19 pandemic

Shortly after leaving Cs, Pérez worked in a political consulting firm until the start of the COVID-19 pandemic. Subsequently, he started preparing campaigns for lobbies and established Resistencia Popular S. L., a company through which he receives confidential information and then disseminates it on his social networks. Due to the dissemination of these pieces of information he has been deemed as a propagator of fake news. Thanks to his political activism Pérez became an online celebrity within the Spanish alt-right and began collaborating in Javier Negre's far-right YouTube channel EDATV. In May 2020, he installed several placards in Madrid which depicted the face of the Spanish prime minister Pedro Sánchez imitating the Big Brother and the text "A good citizen obeys". On 22 November 2020, his Twitter account was briefly suspended for a few hours over the spread of fake news. Pérez received support from several public figures of Vox and used to express his support for the party until he criticized Vox MP Juan Luis Steegmann for his pro-vaccine stance.

On 13 December 2023 Pérez published in his YouTube channel the first interview with former president of the Royal Spanish Football Federation Luis Rubiales since his forced kiss to Jenni Hermoso. Pérez himself had leaked a video of the footballers celebrating their victory in the 2023 FIFA Women's World Cup and commenting the kiss in a joking and casual tone, which lead to the suspension of his X (formerly Twitter) account. After his X account was again suspended, Pérez began spreading his messages through his Telegram account, which as of May 2024 has almost 450,000 followers. He used his Telegram account to promote the 2023 Spanish protests and led one of them towards the Congress of Deputies alongside founder of Desokupa Daniel Esteve.

==== Legal affairs ====
On March 31, 2020, in the context of the COVID-19 pandemic in Spain, Pérez tweeted that the former mayor of Madrid, Manuela Carmena, had received at her home a personal ventilator from the company VitalAire to avoid going to a public hospital. That same day, Carmena denied the information, calling them a slander, and later that year she filed a lawsuit against Pérez. On 16 March 2023, the Court of First Instance No. 59 of Madrid ordered Pérez to delete the tweet and pay €5,000 to Carmena.

Pérez has engaged in several legal feuds with journalist Ana Pastor for statements he made on Twitter. In January 2023 Pérez was fined €1,000 for insinuating in Twitter that Pastor's fact-checking company Newtral had committed irregularities and had not paid sufficient taxes. In February 2024, the Supreme Court of Spain annulled the sentence establishing that his statements "were supported by an adequate factual basis" and sentenced Pastor to bear the costs of the trial. Moreover, the Provincial Court of Madrid ordered him in July 2023 to pay €10,000 in damages to Pastor for publishing a picture of Pastor having dinner at a restaurant with her husband. In June 2024, the Supreme Court lowered the fine to €7,000, therefore becoming the first non-appealable sentence against him.

In January 2021, Pérez posted on his Twitter account two pictures of minister of Transport José Luis Ábalos in which he appeared alone on the terrace of his house next to a cage of birds along with the text "What would you think of the mental health of a Minister who spends all afternoon staring at a pair of caged birds?" Although the tweet was deleted shortly after, Ábalos sued Pérez. On 11 November 2022, a court in Madrid sentenced Pérez to pay a compensation of €60,000 for unlawful interference with his right to honor, since those pictures "had no public interest or relevance, were taken within the private sphere of the politician and were totally unrelated to his public function". On 22 September 2023, the Provincial Court of Madrid annulled the sentence, considering that the court of first instance had committed errors notifying the defendant, and ordered the repetition of the trial.

=== 2024 European Parliament election ===
On 22 February 2024, Pérez announced on his Telegram channel his candidacy for the 2024 European Parliament election in Spain in order to gain parliamentary immunity and avoid his multiple legal proceedings. Initially, he attempted to register a political party called Alvise; due to the Spanish law prohibiting to name a party after a public person, he founded a grouping of electors called Se Acabó La Fiesta (SALF, "The Party Is Over"). According to his campaign, SALF collected 136,000 signatures, nine times more than the 15,000 required.

SALF ran its campaign through social networks relying on Pérez's big online community and avoiding spending money on traditional massive rallies. Pérez's electoral platform included a monthly raffle of his salary as a Member of the European Parliament (MEP) and a potential referendum on Spain's withdrawal from the European Union. Shortly after the official proclamation of the candidacies for the election, SALF began surging in opinion polls with possibility of winning up to two seats, according to the Centre for Sociological Research. Polling suggested that more than 16% of Vox voters in the 2023 Spanish general election were considering voting for SALF, which caused concern within Vox's leadership.

The election saw SALF emerge as the sixth-largest national force, receiving more than 800,000 votes and 4.6% of the vote. Pérez was elected as an MEP along with Diego Solier and Nora Junco, neither of whom had participated in the campaign. In his speech following the declaration of the results, Pérez promised to use an "iron fist" with criminals and vowed to incarcerate Prime Minister Pedro Sánchez.

=== Member of the European Parliament ===
During his first plenary session in the European Parliament on 16 July 2024, Pérez confirmed his intention to transform SALF into a full-fledged political party and to contest the next general election. Initially, Pérez joined negotiations between Alternative for Germany and other European far-right parties for the formation of a new parliamentary group, which materialized into the formation of Europe of Sovereign Nations (ESN). However, despite Hungarian MP László Toroczkai announcing that SALF would join the group, they pulled out minutes before the formal presentation of ESN. Subsequently, SALF requested to join the European Conservatives and Reformists Group (ECR)—which Vox had left shortly before. In December, ECR allowed Solier and Junco to join the group as individual members while Pérez remained in the Non-Inscrits, owing to the legal investigation for illegal funding on him.

On 22 October 2025, the European Parliament announced starting the process to remove his parliamentary immunity. Pérez' immunity was removed on 28 April 2026.

In 2026, Transparency International included him in a list of 14 MEPs shared to Politico Europe who had not declared external income. Pérez had previously committed to declaring his income as an influencer at the end of each year (estimated to be €20,000 per month) but had not done so since being elected.

== Political positions ==
Pérez's stances have been described as far-right, alt-right, and anti-establishment. He has been described as the "Spanish Bukele", with him being inspired by the outsider politics of Latin American presidents Javier Milei and Nayib Bukele. When he was a member of the Liberal Democrats, he had pro-European views and defended that "the European Union will be a federation or it will not be. And we, the liberals will have a lot to say about that." During his membership in Cs, he distinguished himself for being against the party's official position on immigration and gender-based violence. In 2020, he self-described as being "more liberal than conservative". He is a Christian and alongside Hazte Oír has engaged in sidewalk counseling in front of abortion clinics.

Pérez is opposed to illegal immigration, calling for mass deportations of immigrants, including those who acquired the Spanish nationality. He is in favour of a potential referendum on Spain's withdrawal from the European Union, and has spoken against the perceived partitocracy. Pérez has been critical of King Felipe VI, and has voiced support for a republic in Spain. He also supports reforming the Constitution to implement forced labour for pederasts and murderers. He endorses same-sex marriage because he is "a firm supporter of civil rights without any discrimination, and the choice of one's sexual orientation is one of the most fundamental rights that can exist". He is also against bullfighting and has voted against subsidizing it.

== Personal life ==
Pérez's partner was Spanish model Andrea de las Heras, who was the first runner-up in Miss Universe Spain 2020. They broke up in 2024. He previously had a "sentimental relationship" with Vox member Mireia Borrás, then a member of the Congress of Deputies.
