= Se Acabó La Fiesta =

Political party

The Party is Over Se Acabó La Fiesta
- Abbreviation: SALF
- President: Alvise Pérez
- Founded: 30 April 2024
- Registered: 31 January 2025
- Headquarters: Paseo de la Castellana 72, 28046 Madrid
- Ideology: Spanish nationalism Economic liberalism Right-wing populism Euroscepticism; Techno-populism
- Political position: Right-wing to far-right
- European Parliament group: ECR Group (2024–2025); Non-Inscrits (since 2025)
- Colours: Brown
- Congress of Deputies: 0 / 350
- Spanish Senate: 0 / 266
- European Parliament (Spanish seats): 1 / 61
- Regional parliaments: 0 / 1,268

Website
- seacabolafiesta.com

Se Acabó La Fiesta (SALF, lit. 'The Party is Over') is a Spanish right-wing to far-right political party founded by the social media personality Alvise Pérez.

Politically, SALF has described itself as an anti-corruption, anti-establishment, and economically liberal political force. It was initially registered as a grouping of electors to take part in the 2024 European Parliament election, in which it won three seats. In 2025, MEPs Nora Junco and Diego Solier left the party due to conflict with Pérez.

== History ==
=== Background ===
Alvise Pérez, the founder of SALF, is known for his activity on social networks, such as Telegram, where he has more than 700,000 subscribers and rallies against "the deep state". Alvise calls himself a "free and independent news channel" and is considered among its supporters to be "a staunch defender of the truth and the fight against political corruption". Pérez claims that denouncing and fighting against corruption in all its aspects (political, judicial, business, and the media) is the central axis of his speech and actions, and he boasts of "making trouble" for the political class and the media, as a result of which he has been called an agitator.

In 2019, Pérez was dismissed from the Citizens party over controversial statements he had made on Twitter. Since the COVID-19 pandemic in Spain, he has become a leading figure of the alt-right movement in Spain. He has been compared to the incumbent El Salvador president Nayib Bukele and called "the Spanish Bukele", as well as to the incumbent Argentinian president Javier Milei. During the 2010s, he was a member of two liberal parties (Unión, Progreso y Democracia, Ciudadanos) in Spain and the United Kingdom (Liberal Democrats), had pro-European views, and was more liberal than conservative; since then, some analysts consider that his views have shifted towards the political right. They have since been described by critical commentators and journalists as alt-right, anti-establishment, and far-right.

Perez's activity on social networks consisted in receiving information about alleged irregularities and illegal acts committed by politicians at the national, provincial, and local levels, and also some businessmen, which he ties to the media. For this reason, the logo of the group of voters is a squirrel with the typical Guy Fawkes mask of Anonymous, referring to the community of anonymous followers committed to the fight against systemic corruption. His collaborators, affectionately called "squirrels", sent him numerous videos and documents that started investigations into several politicians in 2023 and 2024, including the Koldo affair and the case of Tito Berni.

Pérez's social media activities are controversial, and he has been accused by his critics of spreading misinformation and fake news about Spanish left-wing personalities, and of being a far-right populist. In addition, Pérez himself was denounced before the courts on several occasions by some politicians and journalists, including Ana Pastor, the transport minister Óscar Puente, the former minister José Luis Ábalos, a former state secretary for security, and the daughter of the incumbent Spanish prime minister Pedro Sánchez. In relation to this complaint, Pérez stated that the courts wanted to hold him responsible for comments made only by some users among his many followers on his social networks, arguing that it was impossible to control absolutely everything that thousands of people freely publish.

As of June 2024, Pérez has never been convicted in a final and non-appealable sentence. At the same time, the Madrid Court revoked a previous ruling that forced Pérez to pay €60,000 to Ábalos due to null procedural actions that had generated defenselessness in the accused, which would force the trial to be repeated. Furthermore, after four years of litigation, the Supreme Court of Spain ruled in favour of Pérez, forcing Pastor to bear the costs of the trial.

Given this, Pérez defended himself by arguing that all those complaints against him were part of a political and media persecution campaign, with the aim of silencing him and his recently founded grouping of electors. As examples of his alleged persecution, he stated that numerous Spanish media would mention him only to attack him, and cited the deletion of all pages of the Spanish Wikipedia that had been created about his grouping of electors; Pérez attributed this situation to the possible benefits that not only politicians, but also several businessmen and various media conglomerates would be obtaining from the corruption networks he claims to fight against. For these reasons, he expressed his hope that obtaining the status of member of the European Parliament would allow him to obtain judicial immunity to avoid reprisals from the powers of the state for his fight against corruption.

=== Founding ===
The grouping was founded in early 2024 around the figure of Alvise Pérez, who had previously been member of the centrist liberal parties Citizens and Union, Progress and Democracy; additionally, he was an international delegate of the Young Liberals, the youth wing of the Liberal Democrats in the United Kingdom. Pérez announced that SALF would take part to the 2024 European Parliament election in Spain, where it was registered as the No. 23 of the 33 participating lists.

=== 2024 European elections ===
The official announcement that SALF would take part to the 2024 European Parliament election came on 22 February 2024 through Pérez's Telegram channel. Initially, he attempted to register a political party called Alvise; due to the Spanish law prohibiting naming of a political party after a public person, he founded Se Acabó La Fiesta. According to his campaign, SALF collected 136,000 signatures, nine times more than the 15,000 required; however, he also denounced on his Telegram channel an alleged attempted boycott by some postal officials who, according to his accusations, had deliberately withheld various bags full of signatures in order to try to prevent them from being presented in time to register the electoral candidacy.

SALF ran its campaign through social networks relying on Pérez's big online community and avoiding spending money on traditional massive rallies. Pérez's electoral platform included the promise of a monthly raffle of his salary as a member of the European Parliament and a potential referendum on Spain's withdrawal from the European Union.

Shortly after the official proclamation of the candidacies for the election, SALF began registering in opinion polls with an estimated 0.9% of the votes and the possibility of winning up to two seats according to the spanish Centre for Sociological Research. Several polls also suggested that more than 16% of Vox voters in the 2023 Spanish general election or 18% of its voters in the 2019 European Parliament election were considering voting for SALF, which caused concern within Vox's leadership; Santiago Abascal's party said it fears that the SALF is going to split the right-wing electorate and steal votes from them. According to other opinion polls, SALF would receive between 2.9% and 3.8% of the votes, and the possibility of obtaining between one and two seats on the European Parliament. According to the latest electoral polls of the spanish CIS, he could get between 4.9 and 5.7% of the votes, which would be equivalent to obtain between two and three deputies of the European Parliament. As a result, some small parties like Junts and Podemos also fear that the irruption of this new grouping of electors could jeopardize their hopes of obtaining representatives in the European Parliament. Ultimately, the party received 4.6% of the vote and three seats in the European Parliament.

=== European parliament group breakup ===
Alvise Perez accused his two other MEPs − Nora Junco and Diego Solier − of having been bought by lobbies to defend the divergence in the votes in the European Parliament. However, the two MEPs voted the same as the rest of their colleagues in the European Conservatives and Reformists Group. Faced with this accusation, their colleagues announced they were considering taking legal action against Alvise.

On May 6, 2025, Nora Junco and Diego Solier announced they were becoming independents after accusing Alvise of "thuggery and blackmail."

=== 2026 regional elections ===
SALF ran its first campaign in an autonomous community in the 2026 Aragonese regional election, where the party won 2.73% of the vote, falling short of a seat in the Cortes of Aragon by less than 1,500 votes. A month later, in the 2026 Castilian-Leonese regional election, SALF received 1.4% of the vote, gaining no seats in neither of the two elections. The party also ran for the 2026 Andalusian regional election, obtaining 2.53% of the vote and failing to win any seats once again.

== Ideology ==
SALF's ideology claims to focus on reducing corruption in Spain, a prominent priority in its electoral program. The electoral program of SALF, as indicated by Pérez in various interviews to the media, can be summarized in the following basic axes:

1. measures against corruption;
2. measures against the perceived particracy;
3. measures in favour of freedom of expression;
4. child protection and fighting against pedophilia;
5. a reformulation of the state.

Pérez stated he hopes that obtaining the status of member of the European Parliament would allow him to obtain judicial immunity to be able to better fight corruption without fear of being retaliated against by the powers of the state. In addition, Pérez promised that he would publicly raffle among citizens "100% of the European public salary monthly if elected" as a member of the European Parliament.

Pérez openly defended political ideas that fit into the liberalism and the economic liberalism since he started his political militancy, and so is also expected for the grouping of electors SALF. In fact, in recent media interviews, Pérez has summarized his ideas in the motto "as much freedom as possible, as much state as necessary." Nevertheless, several political observers and critic commentators described the grouping as far-right. Pérez is known for criticizing what he calls the political caste, which includes both the PP and Vox.

Pérez is opposed to illegal immigration. He was previously critical of Israel, stating that he did not want Spain to be Israel's "prostitute". However, Pérez later condemned the Spanish left for taking anti-Israel stances and expressed support for Israel, arguing that Muslim immigration into Europe had increased antisemitism. Nevertheless, he strongly opposed the actions taken by Israel and the United States in the 2026 Iran war, describing it as "illegal" and an "oil war".

Pérez has opposed financial assistance to Ukraine in the Russo-Ukrainian War. Pérez stands against bullfighting and voted against subsidizing it, unlike the PP and Vox. Pérez is also critical of the King of Spain, and has expressed support for the idea that the country should be transformed into a republic.

== Electoral performance ==
=== European Parliament ===
European Parliament
Election	Leading candidate	Votes	%	Seats	EP Group
2024	Alvise Pérez	803,545	4.6 (#6)	3 / 61	NI
