= Political colour =

Colours used to represent a political ideology, movement or party

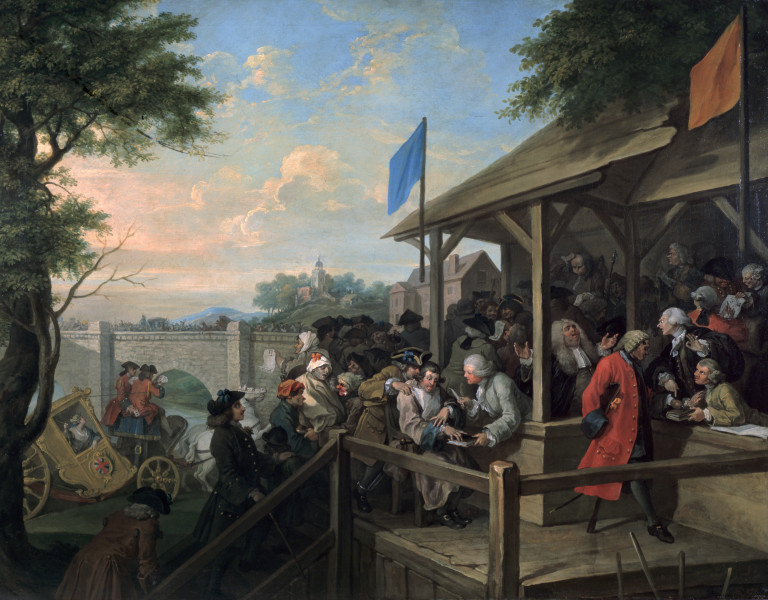
The Polling, by William Hogarth, depicting a 1754 election to the British parliament, includes a blue flag representing the Tories and a buff flag representing the Whigs.

Political colours are colours used to represent a political ideology, movement, party, or a politician either officially or unofficially. They represent the intersection of colour symbolism and political symbolism. Politicians making public appearances will often identify themselves by wearing rosettes, flowers, ties or ribbons in the colour of their political party. Parties in different countries with similar ideologies sometimes use similar colours. As an example, the colour red symbolizes ideologies further to the left of the political spectrum, sometimes referred to as left-wing politics. In some countries this has also been associated with Communism (leading to the use of such terms as "Red Army" and "Red Scare"). The colour blue is often used for conservatism, politics that lie further to the right of the political spectrum, and thus referred to as "right of centre" or "right wing" politics. In more recent years, the colour yellow has been commonly associated with liberalism and right-libertarianism, while the colour green has an association with Green politics so-named after the ideology's choice of that colour and concern with environmental issues, also commonly described as being green.

Though there are some commonalities, the political associations of a given colour do vary from country to country and there are exceptions to the general trends. For example red has historically been associated with Christianity, but over time gained association with leftist politics, while the United States differs from other countries in that conservatism is associated with red and liberalism with blue. Mass media has driven a standardization of colour by political party, to simplify messaging, while historically the colour a candidate chose to identify with could have been chosen based on other factors such as family or regional variations.

== Associations of different colours ==
=== Black ===
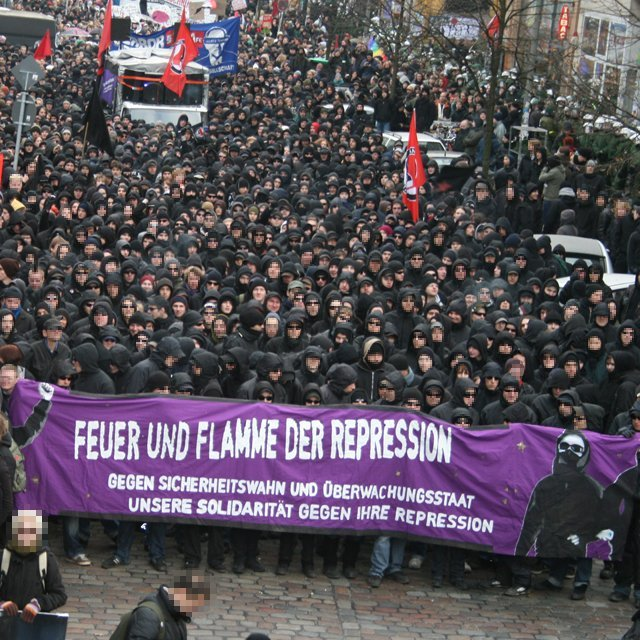
Anarchists in Germany in black bloc

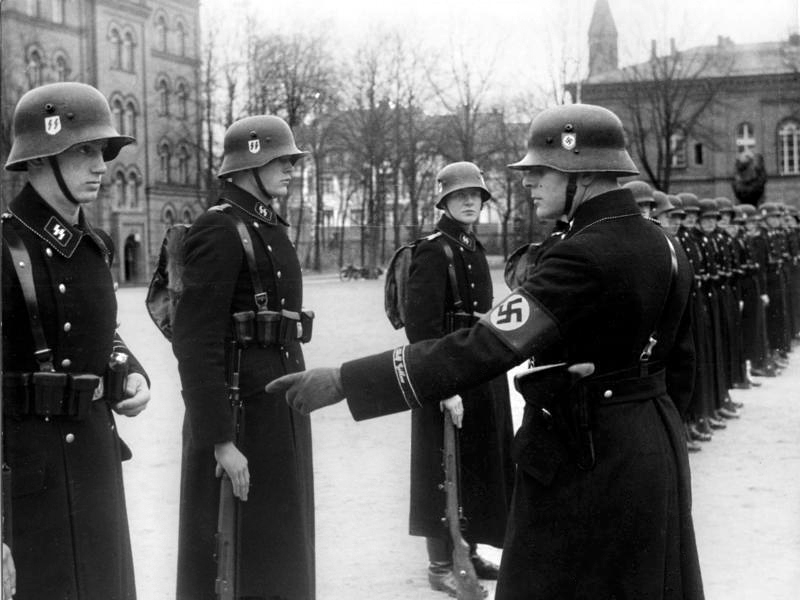
The 1st SS Panzer Division Leibstandarte SS Adolf Hitler (LSSAH) in their black uniforms

The jihadist flag

Black is primarily associated with anarchism (see anarchist symbolism); black is a lack of colour, and anarchism is a lack of a state. It is used in contrast of national flags, to instead represent universal anarchism. Black is also used to a lesser extent to represent ideologies on the opposite end of the spectrum: fascism (see Blackshirts and Schutzstaffel/Gestapo) and jihadism (see Black Standard).

The colours black and red have been used by anarchists since at least the late 1800s when they were used on cockades by Italian anarchists in the 1874 Bologna insurrection, and in 1877 when anarchists entered the Italian town Letino carrying red and black flags to promote the First International. During the Spanish Civil War the CNT used a diagonally half strip of black and red, with black representing anarchism and red representing the labour movement and the worker movement. The flag was quickly adopted by other anarchists, with the second colour used to distinguish specific anarchist philosophies: anarcho pacifism with white, green anarchism with green, anarcho-syndicalism and anarcho-communism with red, mutualism with orange, and anarcho-capitalism with yellow, while black alone typically represents 'anarchism without adjectives'.

During the Golden Age of Piracy, the black flag, or Jolly Roger of pirates such as Blackbeard and Samuel Bellamy became popular symbols of piracy. The flags represented death and no quarter to those who did not surrender. The Crossed Swords Jolly Roger, falsely attributed to John Rackham, has become a popular and recognizable symbol of pirates, particularly of pirates of the Americas. The skull and bones also became a hazardous symbol to display poisons such as cyanide, Zyklon B and other toxic substances. The black flag of piracy would later be considered as symbols of anarchist movements like Makhnovshchina and the Kronstadt rebellion, but the piracy elements in flags of the Makhnovshchina has been proven false by Nestor Makhno himself. The skull and bones was also used in other military troops including right-wing ones like Schutzstaffel, Chetniks and Lavr Kornilov's white russian army. The rise of internet piracy led to the symbols of the golden age of piracy becoming widely adopted, becoming the symbols of pirate sites such as the Pirate bay. Black becoming a colour to represent pirate parties.

Black was also used by some anti-racist and Black nationalist parties, such as the Black Panther Party in the United States and the Popular Unity in Brazil.

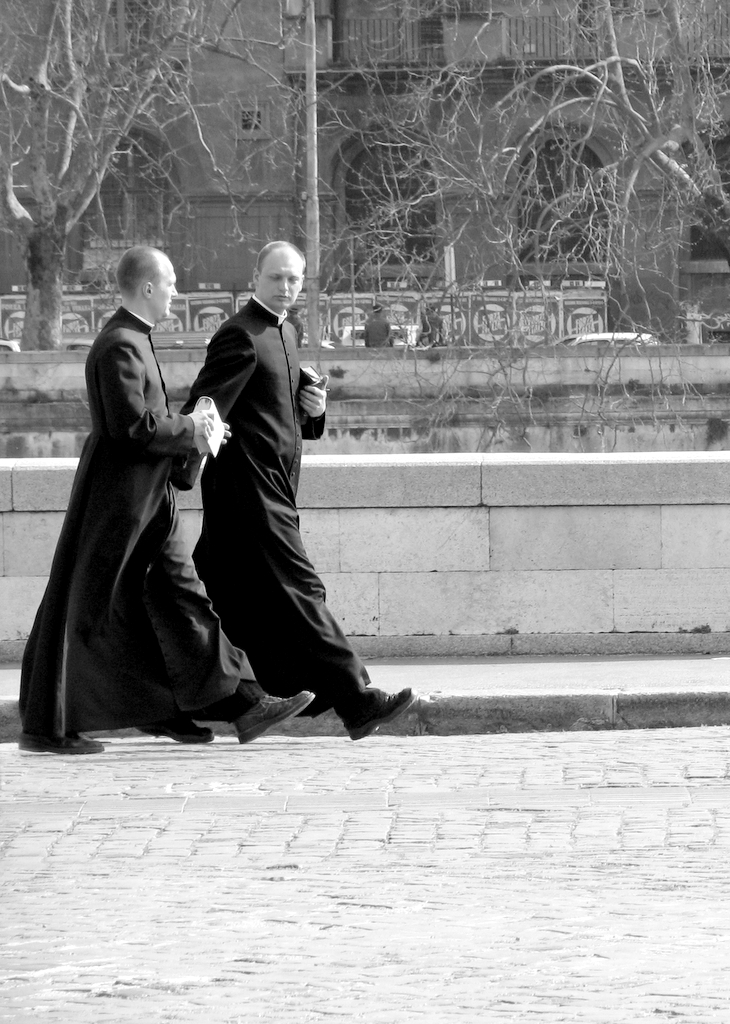
Priests in black clerical robe

- Anti-clerical parties in the late 19th and early 20th centuries sometimes used the colour black in reference to the officials of the Roman Catholic Church because the cassock is usually black.
- In Germany and Austria, black is, due to the black clerical robes of 19th century priests and Jesuits active in politics, the colour historically associated with Christian democratic parties, such as the Christian Democratic Union of Germany (CDU), the Christian Social Union in Bavaria (CSU) and the Austrian People's Party (ÖVP); however, this is only customary, as the official colours of the CDU are usually either one of or a mix of different shades of yellow, orange or blue, depending on the regional branch of the party, with the nationwide party also using the red, black and gold from the German flag as official colours. The CSU uses a medium dark shade of blue as their official colour, as seen in their logo. In 2017, the ÖVP changed their official colour from black to turquoise, with some regional branches switching to turquoise as well, while others continue to use black, often in a mix with another colour, such as red, yellow, green or blue.
- In Italy, black is the colour of fascism because it was the official colour of the National Fascist Party. As a result, modern Italian parties would not use black as their political colour; however, it has been customary to use black to identify the neo-fascist Italian Social Movement.
- In the Islamic world, black flags (often with a white shahadah) are sometimes used by jihadist groups. Black was the colour of the Abbasid caliphate. It is also commonly used by Shia Muslims, as it is also associated with mourning the death of Husayn ibn Ali. It is now known as the flag colour of the Islamic State of Iraq and the Levant.
- In Malaysia, the People's Solidarity Secretariat (SSR), an umbrella youth organization, launched the Black Flag Movement (#BenderaHitam) in 2021 as a resistance-based protest against the then ruling Perikatan Nasional government. The Malaysian United Democratic Alliance (MUDA) also adapted the colour black as their official colour.
- In Russia, black was used for monarchism and nationalist movements, such as the Black Hundreds before their defeat.
- In India, black has often been a theme in protests. In the state of Tamil Nadu, black is associated with the Dravidar Kazhagam, a left-wing social movement, led by Periyar, a social reformer and politician.
- In Brazil, the far-left socialist and anti-racist party Popular Unity has black as its official colour.

=== Blue ===
Blue is usually associated with centre-right or conservative parties, originating from its use by the Tories (predecessor of the Conservative Party) in the United Kingdom. Blue is used by many international organizations of centre right and conservative parties, such as the International Democrat Union, the Democrat Union of Africa, the Asia Pacific Democrat Union, the Caribbean Democrat Union (together with red), the European Democrat Union, the European People's Party, the European Conservatives and Reformists Party.

- The field of the flag of the United Nations is light blue, chosen to represent peace and hope. It has given rise to the term "bluewashing".
- The colour blue, normally of a lighter shade, is of prime significance in Judaism. The flag of Israel features two blue horizontal stripes and a blue Star of David, so blue, often combined with white, is often used by mainstream Zionist parties and movements, such as the Jewish National Fund or more recently the Blue and White alliance. See also tekhelet, National colours of Israel and Zionism.
- The colour blue has occasionally been used by socially conservative factions of otherwise left-leaning political parties, such as Blue Labour in the United Kingdom (though its use has also been attributed to blue-collar working class values, see below).
- In Australia the colour blue has been associated with conservatism and the right since pre-federation, taking influence from the United Kingdom. The major centre-right, conservative political party, called the Liberal Party of Australia, uses blue, as did its predecessor party: United Australia.
- In Austria, blue is heavily associated with the right-wing populist Freedom Party and with pan-Germanism. It is the Freedom Party's official colour, and its members are generally referred to as "blues" in the media and colloquial speech. The blue cornflower was a national symbol of Germany in the 19th century, often associated with Prussia. It later became a symbol for Pan-German nationalists in Austria, such as Georg Ritter von Schönerer's Alldeutsche Vereinigung. In 1930s Austria the cornflower was also worn by members of the then illegal NSDAP, as a secret symbol and identifier. After 1945, MPs of the Freedom Party wore cornflowers on their lapels at the openings of the Austrian parliament, until they switched to the more "Austrian" Edelweiß in 2017.
- In Argentina, blue is associated with the syncretic Peronist movement. The left-wing populist Frente de Todos uses sky blue alongside the Justicialist Party, the main party of the front. Federal Peronism, which represents the right wing of the Peronist movement and the conservative Christian Democratic Party current, uses dark blue.
- In Belgium, blue is associated with liberalism, used both by the Open Flemish Liberals and Democrats as the Reformist Movement.
- In Brazil, blue is associated with mainstream centre-right, liberal and conservative parties opposed to populism, often associated with the left but also opposed with the populist reactionary right, like National Democratic Union, National Renewal Alliance, Progressive Party, Brazilian Social Democracy Party, Democratas and Brazil Union. The first major party which used blue was the far-right Brazilian Integralist Action, but their successors use Gold.
- In Canada, the Conservative Party uses blue. Also, blue is often used to represent Quebec. The Bloc Québécois, a federal party centred around Quebec nationalism, uses blue, as do major provincial parties in Quebec like the Parti Québécois and Coalition Avenir Québec. The colour is also used to represent the many provincial Conservative parties, often called the "Progressive Conservative Party" or PC, for short.
- In Germany, the far-right Alternative for Germany uses a light blue as their primary colour.
- In Honduras, blue is used by the conservative National party.
- In Hong Kong, blue is used by pro-Beijing camp, but also used by localists (for symbolizing Hong Kong independence).
- In India, sky blue is associated with the Indian National Congress, a centrist political party. Meanwhile, dark blue is associated with the Dalit Movement, represented by multiple parties: Republican Party of India (and its Athawale splinter), Bahujan Samaj Party, etc.
- In Indonesia, blue is used by the centrist Democratic Party and the center-left NasDem Party. It is also used by the islamist party National Mandate Party.
- In the Republic of Ireland, blue is associated with the centre-right Fine Gael party, going back to the Blueshirts, a quasi-fascist uniformed group that merged into the party in 1932. "Blueshirt" is a common derogatory term for Fine Gael, and they often use blue in party materials.
- In Japan, blue is associated with liberal, centrist, and centre-left parties. Three centre-left parties in Japan with elected representatives use blue: the Constitutional Democratic Party, Democratic Party for the People, and the Social Democratic Party. Historically, blue was used by Japan Socialist Party.
- In Malaysia, blue was currently used to represent both Barisan Nasional (royal blue) and Perikatan Nasional (solid blue).
- In Poland, blue is used by the right-wing populist PiS party, and a darker version (navy blue) is also used by the far-right Confederation party.
- In Russia, blue is an official colour of the ruling party, United Russia.
- In Singapore, blue is usually associated with the ruling People's Action Party, though it is also used for the Workers' Party as its colour represents blue-collared working class, to keep up with the civic nationalism and social democracy ideologies.
- In South Africa, blue is usually associated with liberal political parties, the most popular being the Democratic Alliance, the largest opposition party. The colour blue was also used by the United Party, from which the Progressive Party (the most senior ancestor of the Democratic Alliance) split in 1959.
- In South Korea, traditionally blue was used by conservative parties. Since 2013, blue has adopted by the liberal Democratic Party of Korea (previously used green and yellow), while conservative party change its colour from blue to red. This makes South Korea an exception to the general rule that blue represents conservative parties, along with the United States.
- In Spain, blue is the colour of the mainstream conservative People's Party, but regionally:
  - Light blue is used by Galician nationalism as it appears in the flag of Galicia.
  - Dark blue is used by non-separatist Catalan nationalism, being the colour of Convergence and Union, which ruled Catalonia from 1980 to 2003 and from 2010 to 2015, and its successor PDeCAT.
  - Light blue is used by pro-independence party Junts
- In Taiwan and historically in China, it is used by the Kuomintang and the wider Pan-Blue Coalition, a coalition generally associated with Chinese nationalism as well as conservatism.
- In the United States, the colour blue has been associated with the liberal Democratic Party since around the 2000 presidential election, when most of the major television networks used the same colour scheme for the parties. This makes the United States an exception to the general rule that blue represents conservative parties; the major conservative party in the United States, the Republican Party, uses red. In 2010, the Democratic party unveiled a blue official logo (see red states and blue states).
- In Venezuela, blue represents the Democratic Unity Roundtable, the large multi-ideological coalition of parties in opposition, probably as a counterpart to PSUV's red.
- In most of Latin America, blue is used as a colour of anti-feminism and, more specifically, anti-abortion. This colour was used as a response to the feminist/pro-abortion green. This originated in Argentina.

=== Brown ===
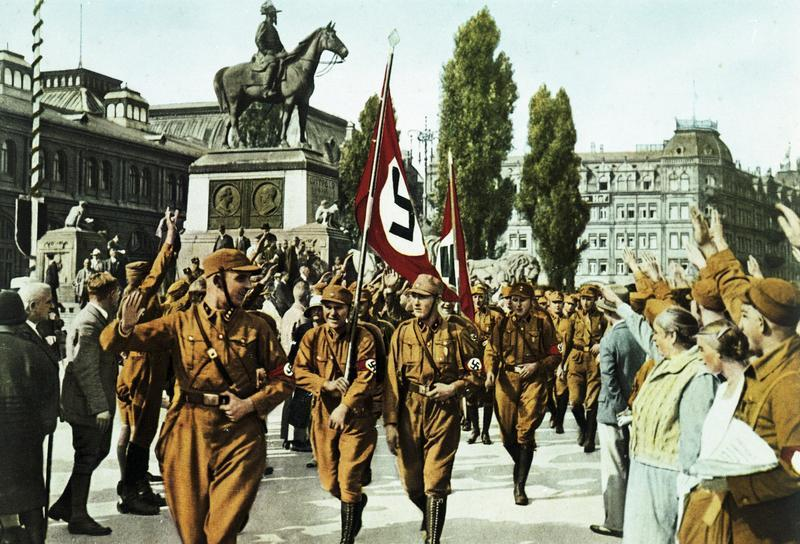
The Sturmabteilung of the Nazi Party, wearing their brown uniforms

Brown has been associated with Nazism, and in particular the Nazi Party in Germany, because of the Sturmabteilung (SA), whose members were called "brown shirts". They were modelled on Benito Mussolini's blackshirts, and the colour of their shirts was chosen because many brown uniforms intended for the colonial troops in Germany's African colonies were cheaply available after the end of World War I. In Europe and elsewhere, the colour brown is sometimes used to refer to fascists in general.

Brown has also been used to refer to the far-right in general, rather than exclusively Nazism or fascism. In the 21st century, far-right parties in both France and Russia have been represented with the colour brown, especially in contexts where other ideologies are represented by colours (for example red for communists and socialists or green for Islamists). In these cases, as in the original Nazi German context, the colour brown was chosen to refer to the modern far-right on account of the colour's association with the Nazi Sturmabteilung.

- Brown is sometimes used to describe the opposite of green parties, that is to describe parties that care little about pollution.

=== Buff ===
- Buff, along with blue, was the colour of the Whig faction in British politics from the early 18th century until the middle of the 19th century. As such, it is sometimes used to represent the current political left (in opposition to blue, which represented the Tories and then the Conservatives and political right).

=== Grey ===
- Grey is sometimes used by parties that represent the interests of pensioners and senior citizens, such as "The Greys" in Germany.
- Grey can also be used to refer to either reactionary independence, neo-Confederate or secessionist movements, due to its association with the Confederate States of America; specifically, with its uniforms during the American Civil War.
- Grey is often used to represent independent politicians; however in the UK, white is used to represent independent politicians.
- Grey is the unofficial color of the technocracy movement of the mid-20th century, due to followers like to wear a grey suits and like to paint their cars in a grey color.

=== Green ===
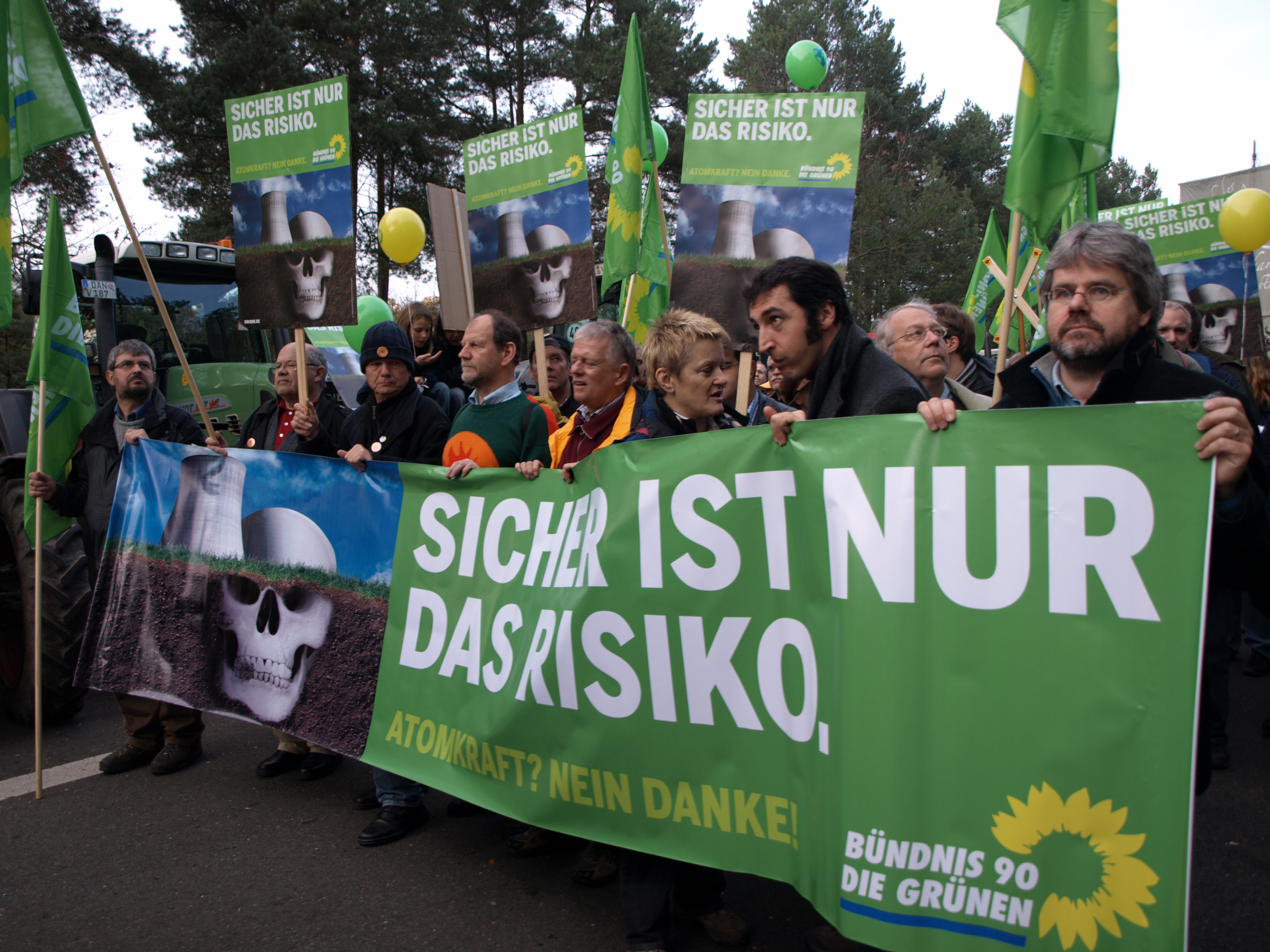
Green banner and signs at an anti-nuclear protest by the Green Party in Germany, 2008

Green is the colour for environmentalist and agrarian parties and movements. Considered the holy colour of Islam (see green in Islam), it is also used to represent Islamism, as with Hamas, Saudi Arabia and many Islamist parties.

- In most of Latin America, green is associated with pro-choice movements, the colour started being used in Argentina as a symbol of third wave feminism and abortion rights, with a green scarf as a symbol. However, green is also the colour of many Christian democratic parties in the region which opposes abortion, like in Aruba, Bolivia, Brazil, Ecuador, El Salvador, Guatemala (DCG & El Fente), Honduras, Panama, Paraguay, Peru and Venezuela (COPEI & National Convergence).
- The Esperanto movement makes wide use of green in its symbolism, including the language's flag which is known as the Verda Flago (literally Green Flag)
- Fern green is occasionally used by political organizations and groups who advocate the legalization of medicinal use of marijuana.
- Sea green was used as a symbol by members of the Levellers in 17th-century Britain; for this reason, it is occasionally used to represent radical liberalism.
- In Australia, a dark shade of green is used to represent right wing National Party of Australia, while a light shade of green is used to represent the Australian Greens.
- In Brazil, in addition to its use by the Green Party, green, as the main colour of the Brazilian flag, is strongly associated with Brazilian nationalism and Brazilian people. The big tent, pro-democracy Brazilian Democratic Movement and the anti-corruption and pro-direct democracy Podemos use different shades of green. In the past, green was also the colour of the Conservative Party of the Empire of Brazil.
- In Canada, in addition to its use by the Green Party of Canada, green has also been frequently used by right-wing and populist parties that are unaffiliated with the Conservative Party. Examples include the Social Credit Party of Canada, Reform Party of Canada, Canadian Alliance, Wildrose Party in Alberta and the Saskatchewan Party. Green was also historically used as a secondary colour by the left-wing New Democratic Party, whose primary colour is orange; before this, it was the primary colour of its predecessor, the Co-operative Commonwealth Federation.
- In Denmark, a dark shade of green is used by the right-centre Conservative People's Party (Det Konservative Folkeparti).
- In Iran, green has been used by the Iranian Green Movement, a political movement that arose after the 2009 Iranian presidential election, in which protesters demanded the removal of Mahmoud Ahmadinejad from office.
- In India, green is used mainly by centre-left parties, such as All India Trinamool Congress and All India Anna Dravida Munnetra Kazhagam, and by Islamic political parties, such as the Indian Union Muslim League.
- Most Islamic parties in Indonesia use green as their main party colours. Examples include the United Development Party, National Awakening Party and Reform Star Party.
- Irish Nationalist and Irish Republican movements have used the colour green. Sinn Féin, the SDLP, Fianna Fáil and Aontú all use green as colour. Though the official colour of Ireland is blue, green is the colour of St. Patrick and thus took on a particular significance for Irish nationalists in the 19th century.
- In Italy, Northern secessionist movements such as Lega Nord chose green as their political colour, advocating their Celtic origin. Green was historically associated with republicanism in Italy and is the official colour of the Italian Republican Party.
- In Japan, the dominant Liberal Democratic Party (LDP) uses green as one of its official colours, although the party has used the colour red more prominently in recent years. Other examples of right wing parties adopting the colour green in its branding include the Japan Innovation Party and the now defunct Party of Hope.
- In Macau, green is used by the pro-Beijing camp.
- In Malaysia, green is used by the Islamists, especially the Malaysian Islamic Party and several Malay nationalists as part of the Malay Tricolour (the other being yellow and red).
- In Morocco, it is associated with the Green March of 1975.
- In Paraguay, two centre-left social democratic parties use green: the Revolutionary Febrerista Party and the Progressive Democratic Party
- In the Philippines, Green is associated to Dutertism or "DDS", supporters of President Rodrigo Duterte.
- In Poland, green is used by the agrarian PSL party, and is sometimes associated with the Third Way coalition party. Green is also used by the ultranationalist organization ONR.
- After the Russian Revolution, the Green armies were the range of peasant forces (often aligned with anarchists or the Socialist Revolutionary Party) in Russia and Ukraine that fought against both the Bolshevik Red Army and counter-revolutionary White Army.
- In Serbia, green is often used by minority parties such as the Alliance of Vojvodina Hungarians, the Justice and Reconciliation Party and the Party of Democratic Action of Sandžak (Sandžak's Bosniaks). The Green–Left Front also uses green alongside red.
- In South Korea, green was used by various liberal parties for much of post-war history. When the Democratic Party of Korea was founded in 2014, it used blue instead.
- In Spain, green is used by monarchists, as the initials of "Viva el Rey de España" ("Hail the King of Spain") spell out the word verde (Spanish: green). Currently, green is used by monarchist and far-right party Vox. In order to avoid clash of colours, green parties Más Madrid, Más País and Equo use teal. Also, regionwide:
  - Green is the standard colour of Basque nationalism and separatism; with dark green used by centre-right Basque Nationalist Party, and light green used by abertzale left EH Bildu.
  - Green is the colour of Andalusian nationalism as it appears in the flag of Andalusia, itself purportedly based on the flag of the Medieval Caliphate of Córdoba. es
- In Taiwan, it is used by the Democratic Progressive Party and the wider Pan-Green Coalition, a coalition generally associated with Taiwan independence as well as progressive liberalism.
- In the United States, it is used by the Green Party, which promotes green politics, specifically things like environmentalism.

=== Magenta ===
Magenta is a colour that started being used in the 21st century to replace yellow for some liberal and centrist parties and organizations in Europe. It is not to be confused with the socialist or social democratic use of the colour pink.

- In Germany although the official colour of the left-wing party Die Linke is red, mass media uses magenta as the party colour to prevent confusion with the centre-left Social Democratic Party whose party colour is also red.
- In Poland, magenta is used by the democratic-socialist Razem (Together) party.
- In the Canadian province of Newfoundland and Labrador, magenta was used to represent the short lived Newfoundland Reform Liberal Party.
- In Greece, magenta is used by the left-wing party, Course of freedom.
- In New Zealand, magenta is used by the right-libertarian ACT Party.

=== Orange ===
Orange is the traditional colour of the Christian democratic political ideology and most Christian democratic political parties, which are based on Catholic social teaching and/or neo-Calvinist theology. Christian democratic political parties came to prominence in Europe and the Americas after World War II. Orange less frequently represents various kinds of populist parties. Such is the case in Austria, Germany, France, Portugal, Switzerland, Finland, Romania, Hungary, Slovakia, the Czech Republic and Turkey.

- Since 2004, orange has represented some post-Communist democratic revolutions ("colour revolutions") in Eastern Europe such as the "Orange Revolution" in Ukraine. This gave the colour orange a certain association with radical anti-authoritarian politics in some countries and it has been used as such by groups and organizations in the Middle East, for example in Lebanon, the Palestinian Authority, Egypt, Bahrain and Israel.
- Humanism frequently uses orange for representation. It is the colour of the Humanist International, as well as the humanist parties in Argentina, Costa Rica and Chile, and other humanist organizations.
- Orange is often used to represent the mutualist current in anarchist politics, as a middle ground between pro-market currents such as anarcho-capitalism (associated with the colour yellow of liberalism) and anti-capitalist currents such as anarcho-syndicalism and anarcho-communism (associated with the colour red of communism and socialism).
- In Australia, orange is used to represent the One Nation party, a right-wing populist and national-conservative led by Pauline Hanson. It is also used to represent other populist parties, such as the Centre Alliance party.
- In Brazil, orange is the colour of the liberal New Party and also is the colour of two parties associated with a socially conservative social democracy: Forward and Solidarity.
- In Canada, Orange is the official colour of the social-democratic New Democratic Party. During Jack Layton's leadership green was used as their accent colour; The logo was a green maple leaf with orange "NDP" lettering. Currently light blue is used as their accent colour although it seldom appears and is not included in the logo (the current logo is an orange maple leaf with orange "NDP" lettering).
- In Cyprus, since its adoption by the fans of APOEL FC, orange has been associated with fascist and ultranationalist politics.
- The Czech Social Democratic Party uses orange alongside the more traditional red.
- During the English Civil War of 1642, orange was associated with parliamentarian Roundheads.
- In Greece, orange is associated with liberal and centrist parties, like Center Union, Drassi and Recreate Greece
- In Hungary, the colour is associated with the conservative Fidesz party.
- In Israel, the colour orange has become the dominant colour of the right-wing, with an emphasis on the religious-right. This is when, from 2004, the colour became the leader of a protest against the disengagement plan, and became identified with the right-wing camp.
- In Mexico, orange is not linked to Christian democratic movements (the Christian democratic party Partido Acción Nacional uses blue). Instead, it is linked to the centre-left secular party Movimiento Ciudadano.
- In New Zealand, the Electoral Commission rejected a proposed orange logo for being likely to confuse or mislead voters by being too similar to the colour used by the country's electoral agencies.
- In Peru, orange is associated with Fujimorism and Fujimorist parties such as Popular Force and New Majority (Peru).
- In the Philippines, Orange is associated to supporters of President Joseph Estrada, its Populist party Pwersa ng Masang Pilipino, and its mass organization, the People's Movement Against Poverty or PMAP.
- In Poland, it is associated and was formerly used by the liberal Civic Platform party.
- In Spain, orange is used by Citizens, a liberal party that opposes Catalan separatism. This is in contrast to the yellow used by Catalan separatism (see below).
- In Thailand, orange is used by the banned Future Forward Party, and its successor parties, the Move Forward and the People's Party, been associated with social democracy and progressivism.
- In Japan, Sanseitō, a newly founded, ultraconservative, right-wing populist political party in Japan uses this colour.
- It is the national colour of the Netherlands because of its association with the ruling House of Orange and Prince of Orange, consequently orange is used to show association with the Netherlands or the House of Orange, this support is often called Orangism.
  - In the Republic of Ireland, Northern Ireland and Scotland orange is associated with Unionism and the Orange Order, this originates from William of Orange securing British rule over Irish in 1690.
  - In Belgium an idiology, Orangism, in the 1830s and 1840s supported reunification of Belgium and the Netherlands.
  - In South Africa, orange is often associated with conservative Afrikaner political movements. Orange was the official colour of the National Party which was the country's governing party from 1948 to 1994. Additionally, its successor, the New National Party, used the colour orange. It is the used by the Christian democratic and Afrikaner nationalist party Freedom Front Plus. Orange red is the official colour of the Independent Democrats, a social democratic political party in the Northern and Western Cape Provinces.

=== Pink ===
Pink is sometimes used by social democratic parties, such as in France and Portugal. The more traditional colour of social democracy is red (because social democracy is descended from the democratic socialist movement), but some countries have large social democratic parties alongside large socialist or communist parties, so that it would be confusing for them all to use red. In such cases, social democrats are usually the ones who give up red in favour of a different colour. Pink is often chosen because it is seen as a softer, less aggressive version of red, in the same way that social democracy is more centrist and capitalistic than socialism.

- In some European nations and the United States, pink is associated with homosexuality and the pink flag is used as a symbol in support of civil rights for LGBT people; it is commonly used to represent queer anarchism. This use originates in Nazi German policy of appending pink triangles to the clothing of homosexual prisoners.
- The Austrian liberal party NEOS uses pink as its main colour, though this corresponds closer to the use of magenta typically associated with centrist liberal parties.
- In the Dominion of Newfoundland, pink was used to represent the Newfoundland People's Party.

=== Purple ===
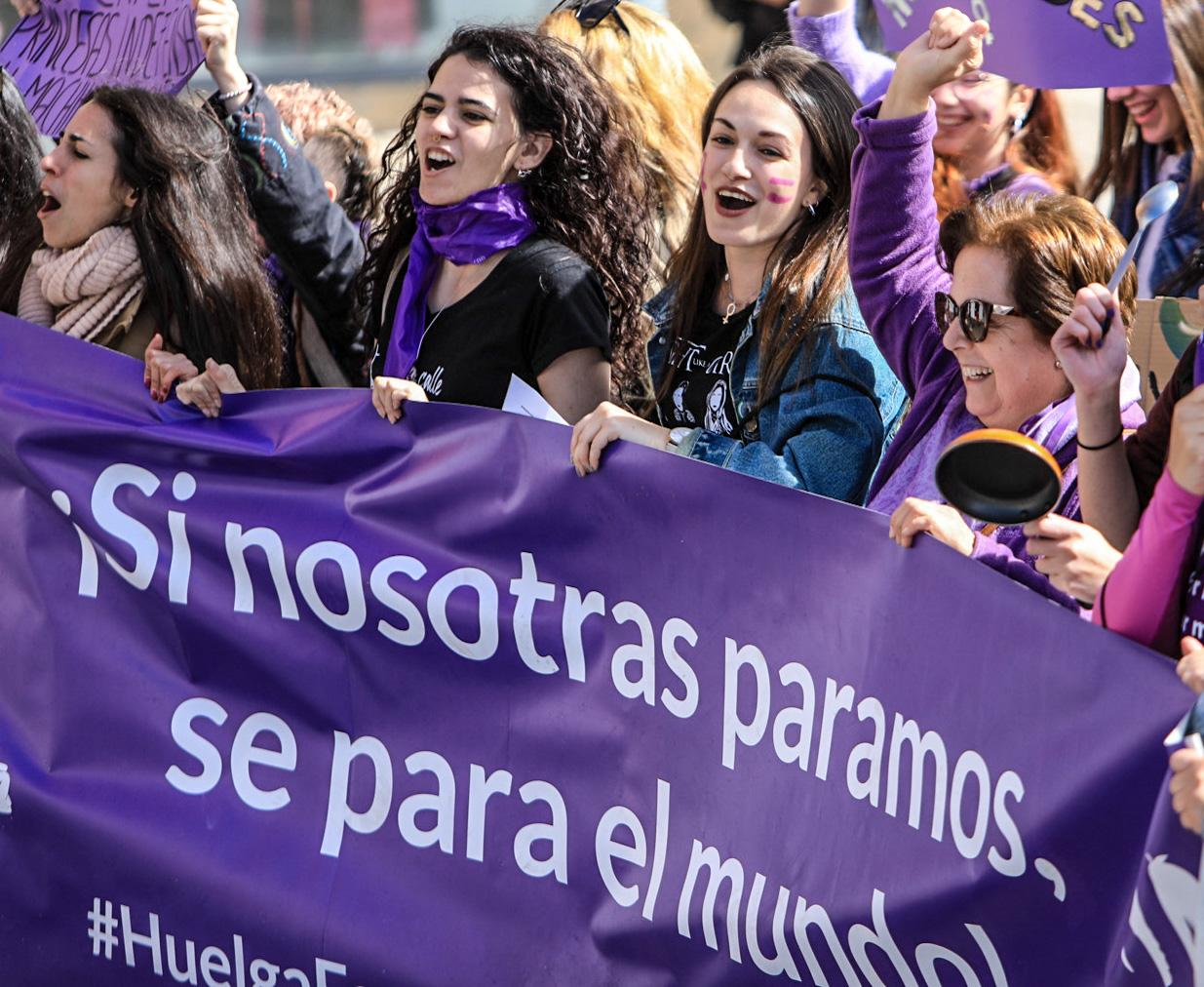
Purple placards and clothing at an International Women's Day event in Spain

Although purple has some older associations with monarchism, it is the most prominent colour that is not traditionally connected to any major contemporary ideology. As such, it is sometimes used to represent a mix of different ideologies, or new protest movements that are critical of all previously existing large parties and minor parties.

- Since purple, green and white were adopted by the Women's Social and Political Union (the Suffragettes), purple has been associated with feminism and the women's movement. 1970s feminists such as Dale Spender and Midge Mackenzie revived these colours, and they were used officially for International Women's Year in 1975 and subsequently as the colours for International Women's Day. Often in combination with green, it the symbol for feminist political parties such as the UK's Women's Equality Party or the Women's List in Iceland. When combined with black, it is used to represent anarcha-feminism.
- Purple has been the colour of the international Pirate Party movement since the founding of the Swedish Pirate Party in 2006.
- In Albania, purple is the colour of the Socialist Party of Albania.
- In Australia, purple is used by the Australian Electoral Commission, the independent statutory authority responsible for the management of federal elections. While use of the colour purple by political parties is not prohibited in itself, it is strongly discouraged owing to the possibility of confusion and the risk of contravening laws against misleadingly branded election signage.
- In Brazil, purple is the colour associated with some progressive liberal movements such as Cidadania and Livres. This colour is chosen because those movements consider themselves to be mixing the best ideas of the left (associated with red) and the right (associated with blue)
- In Canada, the People's Party of Canada is a right-libertarian and right-wing populist party whose colour has been purple since its founding and have changed their logo in 2021 to reflect that. The People's Alliance of New Brunswick are another right-wing party that uses purple in Canada. Previously, purple was used by several municipal politicians, such as Naheed Nenshi and Lisa Helps, as a "nonpartisan" or "postpartisan" colour, due to its lack of association with any major party or ideological viewpoints. In the 1980s and 1990s, the Alberta NDP used purple as their main colour instead of orange – their current colour and the standard colour of NDP parties across Canada. This was because orange was being used as the secondary colour by the Alberta Progressive Conservatives.
- In the Dominican Republic, the Dominican Liberation Party logo is a yellow five-pointed star on a purple background. It was originally a leftist party but today the party is seen gravitating towards a more centrist platform.
- In Europe, purple tends to be used for movements, parties and governments that are neither clearly right nor left. The colour is also used by the European federalist party Volt.
  - It has been used to represent the Purple governments of Belgium and the Netherlands, formed by an alliance of red social-democratic and blue liberal parties.
- In the Republic of Ireland, purple is the colour of the Social Democrats; in most other countries, social democrats use pink or red, but the use of purple has allowed the party to stand out visually from other left-wing parties (such as Labour, Solidarity, People Before Profit and the Workers' Party, who all use shades of red and pink). Co-leader Catherine Murphy used purple as her personal colour when she was an independent politician, prior to the party's foundation in 2015.
- In Israel, because purple has been a less politicized colour (and inspired by Spain's Podemos), the colour has become the symbol of Standing Together, a joint Jewish/Palestinian grassroots movement for social justice.
- In Italy, purple has been adopted by anti-Silvio Berlusconi protesters (see Purple People) as an alternative from other colours and political parties.
- In Peru, the Purple Party is a liberal party which chose purple as its colour to represent centrism, between the blue of the right and red of the left.
- In Spain, purple is associated with leftist anti-fascist republicanism, as purple (originally the colour representing Castile and León), along with gold and red, was the colour of the flag of the Second Spanish Republic. The left-wing to far-left and republican Podemos uses purple.
- In Turkey, the Peoples' Democratic Party (HDP) is often represented with the colour purple. Considered on the left-wing of the political spectrum and a merger of various socialist and pro-Kurdish movements, the party places a strong emphasis on participatory and radical democracy, feminism, LGBT rights, minority rights, youth rights and egalitarianism.
- In the United Kingdom, purple is most commonly associated with UKIP, a formerly prominent eurosceptic party which has since become extremely minor. Purple has also been the official colour of two other British Eurosceptic parties, Veritas and the Christian Peoples Alliance. From these associations, among others, the colour purple has been linked with far-right politics in the UK. However, it is also the colour of the centre-left, pro-European Co-operative Party, which has an electoral pact with the Labour Party.
- In the United States, the Working Families Party, which is a progressive third party, uses purple as one of its primary party colours. The Reform Party of the United States of America uses purple as its color. Purple is also used to describe populations with a near-equal mix of Democrat (blue) and Republican (red) voters, particularly in the context of Presidential elections. 21st-century election reporting commonly refers to "Purple states" or "Purple counties" for regions where neither party appears to have a clear majority among likely voters (i.e. contested frequently between the Republican Party, whose unofficial colour is red; and the Democratic Party, whose unofficial colour is blue). It has also been used to reference Purple America, noting that electoral differences nationwide are observed more on discrepancies instead of unity (see red states and blue states). Purple is also used by centrists to represent a combination of beliefs belonging to the Republicans and the Democrats.

=== Red ===
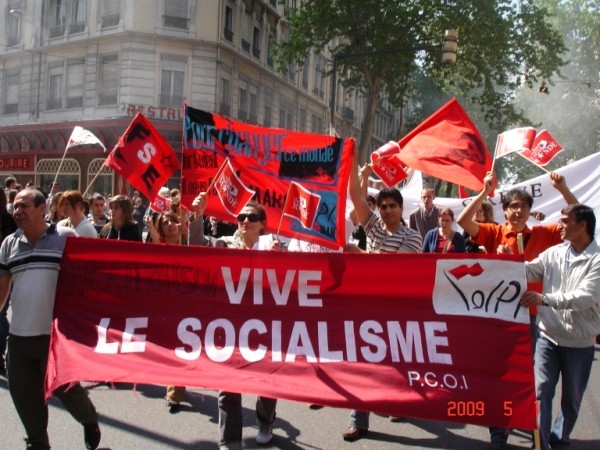
Red flags and a banner at a socialist rally in Lyon, France, on International Workers' Day in 2009

Red is often associated with the left, especially socialism and communism. The oldest symbol of socialism (and by extension communism) is the red flag, which dates back to the French Revolution in the 18th century and the revolutions of 1848. Before this nascence, the colour red was generally associated with Christianity due to the symbolism and association of Christ's blood. The colour red was chosen to represent the blood of the workers who died in the struggle against capitalism. All major socialist and communist alliances and organizations—including the First, Second, Third and Fourth Internationals—used red as their official colour. The association between the colour red and communism is particularly strong. Communists use red much more often and more extensively than other ideologies use their respective traditional colours.

- In Western Europe, Australia, and New Zealand red is also associated with parties of social democracy and democratic socialism and often their allies within the labour movement, a symbol of common solidarity among leftists.
- Additionally, in parts of Latin America, red is also the traditional colour of liberal parties. It was the colour used, for example, in Chile, Colombia, Costa Rica, Honduras, Mexico, Nicaragua and Uruguay for liberal parties.
- In Brazil, red is used by the Workers' Party, supporters of Lula and communist parties. The association of red with Lulism and communism has become so prevalent in recent years that other parties that had red as a primary or secondary colour switched colours so as not to be associated with or confused with Lula, PT and the communist parties.
- In Canada, red is the colour of the Communist Party of Canada and is also used by the Liberal Party of Canada.
- In China, red is the colour used by the Chinese Communist Party (CCP).
- In Hong Kong, red is used by the pro-Beijing camp.
- In Indonesia, red is used primarily by Indonesian Democratic Party of Struggle and their previous iterations, the Indonesian National Party and the Indonesian Democratic Party. It is also used by Indonesian Solidarity Party.
- In Macau, red is used by the pro-Beijing camp.
- In Malaysia, red was currently used to represent Pakatan Harapan and also the Socialist Party of Malaysia. Meanwhile, red is also used United Malays National Organization and Malaysian United Indigenous Party as part of the Malay Tricolour (the other being yellow and green).
- In Poland, it is used by the social-democratic Lewica party. The colour crimson has traditionally been used by Polish monarchists.
- In Russia, red is used by the Communist Party of the Russian Federation. In the Soviet Union, red was the colour used by the Communist Party of the Soviet Union.
- In Singapore, red is used as the official colours for both the Singapore Democratic Party and the Progress Singapore Party. Both parties had social liberalism ideologies.
- In Spain, red is the official colour of both the Spanish Socialist Workers' Party and the Communist Party of Spain. Because the Socialists are a major party, and in order to avoid a clash of colours, the Communist United Left voluntarily uses dark red as its customary colour.
- In Taiwan, it is used by the Taiwan People's Communist Party and the wider united front in Taiwan, associated with Chinese communism and allegiance to the CCP.
- In Thailand, red is used by Pheu Thai Party and supporters of Thaksin Shinawatra, hence the umbrella term "Red Shirts".
- In the Philippines, Red is used by both the Far Left Communist Party of the Philippines and Right Wing President Ferdinand Marcos and his supporters, also known as 'Marcos Loyalists' Kilusang Bagong Lipunan and Kabataang Barangay. It is also associated to the historical Filipino revolutionary Nationalist group Katipunan.
- In the United Kingdom, Australia, New Zealand, and Ireland, red is also the colour of the labour movement and the Labour parties in those countries (spelled 'Labor Party' in Australia). The use of red as a symbol is referenced in the British Labour Party's anthem, The Red Flag.
- In the heyday of the British Empire before 1960, maps, globes, and atlases typically used red or pink to designate the Empire or its Commonwealth; the practice inspired the All-Red Route and the All Red Line. This derived from the Redcoats traditionally worn by the British Army. As soon as a colony became independent, it needed its own distinctive colour and the practice died out.
- A key exception to the convention of red to mean the left wing of politics is the United States. Since about the year 2000, the mass media have associated red with the Republican Party, even though the Republican Party is a conservative party (see red states and blue states). This use is possibly entrenched, as many political organizations (for example, the website RedState) now use the term. Red baseball caps have become specifically associated with Donald Trump and his supporters since the introduction of the MAGA hat.
- Since the 2010s, some conservative parties such as the Liberal Democratic Party of Japan and the People Power Party of South Korea have also adopted red as their political colour.

=== Saffron ===
Saffron is traditionally associated with Hinduism, Hindutva and the Hindu nationalist movement. Saffron was chosen because in Hinduism, the deep saffron colour is associated with sacrifice, religious abstinence, quest for light and salvation. Saffron or "Bhagwa" is the most sacred colour for the Hindus and is often worn by Sanyasis who have left their home in search of the ultimate truth.

=== Teal ===
- In Australia, the colour teal, and the term "teal independents", have become associated with some of the centrist independent candidates supported by the Voices groups in Australia and campaigning on a platform emphasizing climate change action, tackling corruption in politics, and gender equality. Six such candidates won seats at the 2022 Australian federal election, ousting incumbent MPs from the Liberal Party of Australia. One theory about the colour teal in this context is that it symbolizes a mixture of blue (the Liberal Party's colour) with green (representing environmental concerns).
- In Spain, because the colour green is connected to monarchism, environmental parties use teal in order to avoid clash of colours. They include the parties; Más Madrid, Más País and Equo.
- In the United Kingdom, teal is used by right-wing populist Reform UK, because it is seen as a version of the conservative blue.
- In Canada, teal is used by the French-Canadian nationalist Bloc Québécois.
- In Austria, teal is the main colour of the Austrian People's Party. The colour was changed from black to teal as a part of the party's rebranding campaign after the Sebastian Kurz corruption scandal and subsequent drop in the party's popularity.
- In Germany, the CDU uses a teal color as part of their logo although their main color remains Black.
- In New Zealand, teal is used by the radical centrist Opportunity Party, which has described its "blue-green" colour as a mix between business and climate interests.

=== White ===
White is today mainly linked to pacifism (as in the white flag of truce or parley).

- Historically, it was associated with support for absolute monarchy, starting with the supporters of the Bourbon dynasty of France because it was the dynasty's colour. Partly due to this association, white also came to be associated with Jacobitism, itself allied with the Bourbons. White cockades, white ladies' gloves, and Rosa pimpinellifolia (the 'burnet' or 'Stuart' rose) symbolized support for the exiled House of Stuart. Because some of the Russian "Whites" had similar goals to the French "Whites" of a century earlier, it was used by the Whites who fought against the communist "Reds" in the Russian Civil War (see also White Army), although the Whites included many different people with many ideologies, such as monarchists, liberals, anticommunist social democrats and others.
  - Because of its use by anti-communist forces in Russia, the colour white came to be associated in the 20th century with many different anti-communist and counter-revolutionary groups, even those that did not support absolute monarchy (for example, the Finnish "Whites" who fought against the socialist "Reds" in the civil war following the independence of Finland). In some revolutions, red is used to represent the revolutionaries and white is used to represent the supporters of the old order, regardless of the ideologies or goals of the two sides.
- In Italy, a red cross on a white shield (scudo crociato) is the emblem of Catholic parties from the historical Christian Democracy party.
- The white uniforms for the Singapore's political party, the People's Action Party, represents its conservatism, and to promote unity and pure political ideologies.
- In Afghanistan, white has been used to represent the ruling Taliban, reflecting the white background of their flag. In war, the placement of a blank white flag was used to represent their claims rather than surrender.
- In the politics of the United Kingdom, white represents independent politicians such as Martin Bell.
- The Yorkshire Party, a Devolutionist Political Party with elected representatives in Yorkshire, uses a stylized White Rose of York as its emblem.

=== Yellow and gold ===
Yellow and gold are the colours most strongly associated with right-libertarianism and (classical) liberalism. In several countries, the yellow ribbon, often associated with showing support for troops serving in wars, prisoners of war or hostages, has taken on a political meaning.

- In Latin America, it is not unusual for left-wing social democratic parties to use yellow, as red was the traditional colour of liberals, especially in countries with prominent red-using liberal parties like Uruguay, Honduras, Mexico, Colombia and Costa Rica.
- Yellow is also associated with Judaism and the Jewish people, although this may be seen negatively (see also Yellow badge). It has consequently been taken up by the Revisionist Zionist and Kach movements, and yellow ribbons are used to demonstrate support for hostages taken by Palestinian militants, especially after 7 October 2023.
- In East and Southeast Asia, yellow is used to represent monarchies. For instance, in Thailand yellow represents King Bhumibol and King Vajiralongkorn, apart from the colour of the royalists, known as the "yellowshirts". It was also the colour of the pro-monarchy Panchayat system in the Kingdom of Nepal.
- It is also a common colour to represent Buddhism; monks in Myanmar used it in the anti-government protests in 2007–2008.
- Yellow socialism was a political movement in France from 1902 until World War I, opposed to the "red socialism" of Marxism.
- In Australia, yellow is used to represent the United Australia Party established in 2013.
- In Brazil, yellow, combined with green, is associated with right-wing populists and national conservatives movements against corruption, anti-Workers Party, anti-communists, supportive of impeachment of Dilma Rousseff and later, with support of Jair Bolsonaro, like PSL and the Alliance for Brazil. The association came because many of the protesters against Dilma wore the jersey of Brazil national football team, which is yellow with the numbers and some details in green, and because the protesters chanted that the Brazilian flag "will never be red" (in reference to the colours of the communism and Workers' Party) and "will always be green and yellow".
- In Canada, yellow does not have any dominant political connotation, and so is commonly used by Elections Canada as a politically neutral colour and as a high-visibility colour to mark polling stations.
- In the Czech Republic, yellow is used by KDU-ČSL, a Christian democratic party.
- In Estonia, yellow is used by the right-wing liberal Reform Party.
- In Hong Kong, yellow represents the pro-democracy supporters. (See also Yellow economic circle.)
- In Macau, yellow represents the pro-democracy supporters.
- In Malaysia, yellow was formerly used by Bersih (The Coalition for Clean and Fair Elections).
- In the Philippines, yellow is commonly associated with the centre to centre-left Liberal Party although other colours such as red and blue are used.
- In Poland, yellow is used by the liberal centrist party Poland 2050.
- In Romania, yellow is used by the National Liberal Party (PNL).
- In South Korea, yellow associated with historically Uri Party and former President Roh Moo-hyun supporters. Since 2015, Justice Party adopted the colour.
- In Spain, regionally:
  - Yellow is the colour used by supporters of the Catalan independence movement. Since 2017, separatists adopted the yellow ribbon as one of their symbols along with the estelada (pro-independence flag).
  - Yellow is the customary colour of Canarian nationalism, with blue and white, the other colours in the flag of the Canary Islands, also being used.
- In the United States, the colour yellow was the official colour of the suffrage movement of the late 19th and early 20th centuries. In the 21st century, the Libertarian Party's official branding colours are gold-yellow, grey, and black. The gold-yellow colour is prominent because of the historical association with classical liberalism and in reference to a gold-backed currency and free markets.
- In the United Kingdom, the colour yellow is predominantly used by the Scottish National Party, Liberal Democrats, and Alliance Party of Northern Ireland. The use of political yellow dates back to David Lloyd George's publication of "Britain's Industrial Future" in the early to mid-1920s. Yellow denotes freedom, advancement, and novelty, with special importance on the freedom representing the desire of independence for the SNP.

== Colour combinations ==
=== Black, Gold, Green, and Red ===
Black, gold, green, and red are the Pan-African colours (though sometimes only 3 may be present).

=== Black, Green, Red, and White ===
Black, green, red, and white together are the Pan-Arab colours, each representing a different historical Arab dynasty: Black for the Black Standard, used by Muhammad and the Rashidun and Abbasid caliphates. White was the colour of the Umayyad Caliphate. Green is associated with Islam (see Green in Islam) and the Fatimid Caliphate, and red was used by the Hashemites.

=== Red and Yellow ===
This colour combination is often associated to Communism because it symbolizes working-class solidarity and the blood of revolutionaries. Communist flags contain a yellow hammer and sickle and a red background. Examples of flags of former and current Communist countries that have red and yellow combination are the flags of China, Soviet Union, Vietnam, and Democratic Kampuchea.

== By country ==
=== Germany ===
In Germany, colours are commonly used by media and politicians as signals of political affiliation; this public practice helps them reach the increasing number of unaffiliated voters.

Colour schemes used by major political parties in Germany include the following:

- Social Democratic Party (SPD): red
- Christian Democratic Union (CDU) and Christian Social Union (CSU): black (in federal elections) (Note: In state elections and parliaments, CDU and CSU are sometimes depicted in blue.)
- Alliance 90/The Greens: green
- Free Democratic Party (FDP): yellow
- Alternative for Germany (AfD): blue
- The Left (Die Linke): red or purple

=== Russia ===
- In the Russian Federation politics are dominated by the conservative big tent United Russia party who mainly uses blue, but sometimes uses the other national colours of the Russian flag being red and white.
- The Communist Party of the Russian Federation mainly uses red due to its socialist and Soviet roots, being the main successor to the Communist Party of the Soviet Union.
- The far right ultranationalist Liberal Democratic Party of Russia uses blue and yellow.
- The liberal center right New People party uses cyan.
- The center left A Just Russia party uses yellow and dark red.

=== United Kingdom ===
- In Northern Ireland, the Unionist parties in the Northern Ireland Assembly are called the "orange block" and the Nationalist parties are the "green block".
- In Wales, Plaid Cymru, a Welsh nationalist party, uses green and yellow because of the colours of a daffodil, the national flower of Wales; a stylised daffodil is also used as their logo.
- Some of the established political parties use or have used different colour variations in certain localities. This was common in British politics up to the 1970s. The traditional colour of the Penrith and the Border Conservatives was yellow, rather than dark blue, even in the 2010 election Conservative candidates in Penrith and the neighbouring constituency of Westmorland and Lonsdale wore blue and yellow rosettes. In North East England, the Conservatives traditionally used red, Labour green and the Liberals blue and orange. In parts of East Anglia, the Conservatives used pink and blue, while in Norwich their colours were orange and purple. The Liberals and Conservatives used blue and red respectively in West Wales, while in parts of Cheshire the Liberals were red and Labour yellow. During the 18th and 19th centuries, the Tories used orange in Birmingham, pink in Whitby and red in East Worcestershire, while the Whigs were blue in Kendal, purple in Marlborough and orange in Wakefield. The traditional colour of the Warwickshire Liberals was green, rather than orange.

=== United States ===
In this map of the 2012 United States presidential election results, the states are colour-coded by the political colour of the party whose candidate won their electoral college votes, but the political meanings of red and blue in the United States are the opposite of their meanings in the rest of the world.

- In the United States the two major political parties use the national colours, i.e. red, white and blue. Historically, the only common situation in which it has been necessary to assign a single colour to a party has been in the production of political maps in graphical displays of election results. In such cases, there had been no consistent association of particular parties with particular colours. Between the early 1970s and 1992, most television networks used blue to denote states carried by the Democratic Party and red to denote states carried by the Republican Party in presidential elections. A unified colour scheme (blue for Democrats, red for Republicans) began to be implemented with the 1996 presidential election; in the weeks following the 2000 election, there arose the terminology of red states and blue states. Political observers latched on to this association, which resulted from the use of red for Republican victories and blue for Democratic victories on the display map of a television network. As of November 2012, maps for presidential elections produced by the U.S. government also use blue for Democrats and red for Republicans. In September 2010, the Democratic Party officially adopted an all-blue logo. Around the same time, the official Republican website began using a red logo.
  - This association has potential to confuse foreign observers in that, as described above, red is traditionally a left-wing colour (as used with the Democratic Socialists of America), while blue is typically associated with right-wing politics. This is further complicated by the diversity of factions in the Democratic Party ranging from conservatives to right-libertarians to democratic socialists alongside the dominant centrist and social liberal elements of the party that outside the United States often each use different political colours.
  - The conservative Blue Dog Coalition within the Democratic Party adopted the colour blue at its founding, before the 2000 election solidified the red-blue convention.
  - There is some historical use of blue for Democrats and red for Republicans: in the late 19th century and early 20th century, Texas county election boards used colour-coding to help Spanish speakers and illiterates identify the parties, but this system was not applied consistently in Texas and was not picked up on a national level. For instance in 1888, Grover Cleveland and Benjamin Harrison used maps that coded blue for the Republicans, the colour Harrison perceived to represent the Union and "Lincoln's Party" and red for the Democrats.
  - In Puerto Rico, the main party, the pro-statehood New Progressive Party uses blue, while the Popular Democratic Party uses red, and the Puerto Rican Independence Party uses green.
  - In current-day U.S. politics, the colour red is also used to represent Donald Trump's slogan, "Make America Great Again" and its signature accessory, a red baseball cap. The slogan and hat have become the most well-known political symbols in both America and across the world.
  - The colour orange has also seen an uprise in American politics in recent years, being used by those who oppose 45th and 47th president Donald Trump to describe his facial complexion, which appears orange due to his now iconic spray tan.

== See also ==
- Political uniform
- List of political ideologies
- List of political party symbols
- NATO Military Symbols for Land Based Systems#Affiliation
- Red–green alliance, between socialists and greens
- Red–green–brown alliance, between socialists, Islamists, and fascists
- Jamaica coalition (politics)
