= List of conservative parties by country =

Many countries have political parties that are deemed to represent conservative, center-right, right wing, or Tory views, and which may be referred to informally as conservative parties even if not explicitly named so. Those parties are listed below, many of which are members of the International Democracy Union.

== Alphabetical list by country ==
=== A ===
- Åland:
  - Moderate Coalition for Åland
  - Non-aligned Coalition
- Albania:
  - Democratic Party of Albania
  - Republican Party of Albania
- Andorra:
  - Democrats for Andorra
- Australia:
  - Australian Christians
  - Coalition
    - Country Liberal Party
    - Liberal Party of Australia (largest party)
    - Liberal National Party of Queensland
    - National Party of Australia
  - Democratic Labour Party
  - Family First
  - Freedom Party of Victoria
  - Katter's Australian Party
  - Liberal Democrats
  - North Queensland First
  - Pauline Hanson's One Nation
  - Shooters, Fishers and Farmers Party
  - Trumpet of Patriots
  - United Australia Party
- Argentina:
  - Republican Proposal
- Armenia:
  - Conservative Party of Armenia
  - National Unity
  - People's Party
  - Prosperous Armenia
  - Republican Party of Armenia
- Artsakh:
  - Artsakh Conservative Party
- Austria:
  - Austrian People's Party
  - Freedom Party of Austria
  - Alliance for the Future of Austria
  - Christian Party of Austria
  - Freedom Party in Carinthia
  - The Reform Conservatives

=== B ===
- Bahamas:
  - Free National Movement
- Bangladesh:
  - Bangladesh Nationalist Party
- Belgium:
  - Christian Democratic and Flemish
  - Christlich Soziale Partei
  - New-Flemish Alliance
  - Flemish Interest
- Belize:
  - United Democratic Party
- Bolivia:
  - Nationalist Democratic Action
- Botswana:
  - Botswana Democratic Party
- Brazil:
  - Brazilian Labour Renewal Party
  - Democrat
  - Brazil Union
  - Christian Democracy
  - Democratic Renewal Party
  - Liberal Party
  - Progressistas
  - Republicans
- Bulgaria:
  - GERB
  - Bulgarian Rise
  - IMRO – Bulgarian National Movement
  - Union of Democratic Forces
  - George's Day Movement
  - Revival
  - Volya Movement
  - Bulgarian National Unification
  - National Front for the Salvation of Bulgaria
  - Republicans for Bulgaria

=== C ===
- Canada: List of conservative parties in Canada (Federal)
  - Conservative Party of Canada
  - People's Party of Canada
  - Alliance of the North
  - Christian Heritage Party of Canada
  - Libertarian Party of Canada
  - National Citizens Alliance
  - Progressive Canadian Party
- Chile:
  - National Renewal
  - Independent Democratic Union
- Colombia:

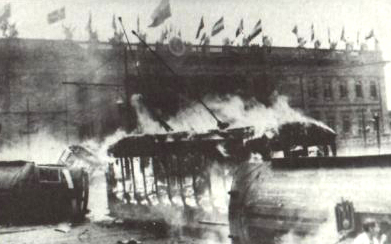
Tram on fire during the revolt known as Bogotazo

  - Colombian Conservative Party
- Cook Islands:
  - Cook Islands Party
- Costa Rica:
  - Social Christian Unity Party
- Cyprus:
  - Democratic Rally
- Czech Republic:
  - Civic Democratic Party
  - KDU-ČSL
  - Motorists for Themselves
  - TOP 09
  - Conservative Party
  - Czech Crown
  - SNK European Democrats

=== D ===
- Denmark:
  - Conservative People's Party
  - Denmark Democrats
  - Danish People's Party
  - Centre Party
- Dominica:
  - Dominica Freedom Party
- Dominican Republic:
  - National Progressive Force

=== E ===
- Ecuador:
  - Social Christian Party
- Estonia:
  - Conservative People's Party of Estonia
  - Isamaa
- European Union:
  - European People's Party
  - European Conservatives and Reformists Party
  - Patriots.eu

=== F ===
- Faroe Islands:
  - People's Party
- Fiji:
  - People's Alliance
  - Social Democratic Liberal Party
- Finland:
  - Christian Democrats
  - Citizens' Party
  - Blue Reform
  - Finnish People First
  - Finns Party
  - National Coalition Party
- France:
  - The Republicans
  - National Rally
  - Movement for France
  - Union of Democrats and Independents
  - Reconquête!
- French Polynesia:
  - ʻĀmuitahiraʻa o te Nūnaʻa Māʻohi

=== G ===
- Georgia:
  - Conservative Party of Georgia
- Germany:
  - Christian Democratic Union of Germany
  - Christian Social Union of Bavaria
  - Alternative for Germany
  - Liberal Conservative Reformers
  - Bavaria Party
  - Centre Party
  - Christian Centre
- Ghana:
  - New Patriotic Party
- Gibraltar:
  - Gibraltar Social Democrats
- Greece:
  - New Democracy
  - Greek Solution
  - Niki
  - Voice of Reason
- Grenada:
  - New National Party
- Guatemala:
  - National Advancement Party

=== H ===
- Honduras:
  - National Party of Honduras
- Hong Kong:
  - Pro-Beijing camp
    - Democratic Alliance for the Betterment and Progress of Hong Kong
    - Business and Professionals Alliance for Hong Kong
    - Liberal Party
    - New People's Party
- Hungary:
  - Fidesz
  - Christian Democratic People's Party
  - Jobbik
  - Tisza Party

=== I ===
- Iceland:
  - Independence Party
- India:
  - Bharatiya Janata Party
  - Shiv Sena
- Indonesia:
  - Crescent Star Party
  - Democratic Party
  - Golkar Party
  - Great Indonesia Movement Party
  - National Mandate Party
  - Perindo Party
  - Prosperous Justice Party
  - Ummah Party
  - United Development Party
- Ireland:
  - Fine Gael
  - Fianna Fáil
  - Renua
  - Irish Freedom Party
  - National Party
- Iran:
  - Alliance of Builders of Islamic Iran
  - Combatant Clergy Association
  - Islamic Coalition Party
  - Ansar-e Hezbollah
  - Modern Thinkers Party of Islamic Iran
  - Moderation and Development Party
  - Coalition of Iran's Independent Volunteers
  - Society of Devotees of the Islamic Revolution (Isargaran)
- Israel:
  - Likud
  - Noam
  - Shas
  - Religious Zionist Party
  - Agudat Yisrael
  - Degel HaTorah
  - United Torah Judaism
  - Otzma Yehudit
  - Yachad
  - HaYamin HeHadash
- Italy:
  - Forza Italia
  - Lega
  - Brothers of Italy

=== J ===
- Jamaica:
  - Jamaica Labour Party
- Japan:
  - Liberal Democratic Party (Japan)
  - Sanseitō
  - Nippon Ishin no Kai
  - Democratic Party for the People
  - Happiness Realization Party
  - Japan First Party
  - Ishin Seito Shimpu
  - Burdock Party
- Jersey:
  - Centre Party (Jersey)

=== L ===
- Latvia:
  - Unity
  - The Conservatives
- Lebanon:
  - Lebanese Forces Party
  - Kataeb Party
  - National Liberal Party (Lebanon)
  - Free Patriotic Movement (Lebanon)
  - National Bloc (Lebanon)
  - Future Movement
- Lesotho:
  - Basotho National Party
- Lithuania:
  - Homeland Union – Lithuanian Christian Democrats
  - Order and Justice

=== K ===
- Kosovo:
  - Democratic League of Kosovo
  - Alliance for the Future of Kosovo

=== M ===
- Malawi
- Malawi Congress Party
- Malaysia:
  - Barisan Nasional
    - United Malays National Organisation
    - Malaysian Chinese Association
    - Malaysian Indian Congress
  - Perikatan Nasional
    - Malaysian United Indigenous Party
- Malta:
  - Nationalist Party
- Mexico:
  - National Action Party
  - Ecologist Green Party of Mexico
  - Social Encounter Party
- Mongolia:
  - Democratic Party
- Mozambique:
  - Mozambican National Resistance

=== N ===
- Netherlands:
  - Christian Democratic Appeal
  - Farmer–Citizen Movement
  - Christian Union
  - Reformed Political Party
  - Forum for Democracy
- New Zealand:
  - ACT New Zealand
  - Auckland Future
  - NewZeal
  - New Zealand First
  - New Zealand National Party
  - New Conservative Party
  - Vision NZ
- North Macedonia:
  - VMRO-DPMNE
  - VMRO – People's Party
- Norway:
  - Conservative Party
  - Progress Party
  - Coastal Party

=== P ===
- Pakistan:
  - Pakistan Muslim League (N)
- Papua New Guinea:
  - Triumph Heritage Empowerment Party
- Paraguay:
  - National Republican Association – Colorado Party
- Peru:
  - Sí Cumple
  - Cambio 90
    - Cambio 90 – New Majority
  - New Majority
  - Alliance for the Future
  - Popular Force
  - Popular Renewal
  - Alliance for Progress
  - We Are Peru
  - Christian People's Party
  - Contigo
- Philippines:
  - Nacionalista Party
- Poland:
  - Law and Justice
  - Civic Coalition
  - Polish People's Party
  - Christian National Union
  - Coalition for the Renewal of the Republic - Liberty and Hope
  - Congress of the New Right
  - League of Polish Families
  - National Movement
  - Poland Together
  - Real Politics Union
  - Right Wing of the Republic
- Portugal:
  - Democratic and Social Centre – People's Party
  - People's Monarchist Party

=== R ===
- Romania:
  - National Liberal Party
  - Alliance for the Union of Romanians
- Russia:
  - United Russia
  - Party of Growth

=== S ===
- Saint Kitts and Nevis:
  - People's Action Movement
- Saint Lucia:
  - United Workers Party
- Saint Vincent and the Grenadines:
  - New Democratic Party
- Samoa:
  - Faʻatuatua i le Atua Samoa ua Tasi
  - Human Rights Protection Party
- Serbia:
  - Democratic Party of Serbia
  - Serbian Radical Party
  - Dveri
  - Serbian Party Oathkeepers
  - Serbian Right
  - Serbian Patriotic Alliance
  - Serbian People's Party
  - Alliance of Vojvodina Hungarians
  - United Serbia
  - People's Peasant Party
  - Justice and Reconciliation Party
  - Party for Democratic Action
  - Party of Democratic Action of Sandžak
  - Better Serbia
  - Statehood Movement of Serbia
  - Fatherland
  - New Serbia
  - People's Party
  - People's Freedom Movement
  - Movement for the Restoration of the Kingdom of Serbia
  - Healthy Serbia
- Slovakia
  - Christian Democratic Movement
  - Slovakia
  - Slovak National Party
  - Democrats
  - For the People
  - Christian Union
  - We Are Family
  - Hungarian Alliance
  - NOVA
  - Civic Conservative Party
- Slovenia
  - Slovenian Democratic Party
  - New Slovenia
  - Slovenian People's Party
- South Korea:
  - People Power Party
  - Our Republican Party
  - Pro-Park New Party
- Spain:
  - People's Party
  - Vox
- Sri Lanka:
  - United National Party
- Sweden:
  - Christian Democrats
  - Moderate Party
  - Sweden Democrats
- Switzerland:
  - Federal Democratic Union of Switzerland
  - Swiss People's Party

=== T ===
- Taiwan:
  - Kuomintang (Chinese Nationalist Party)
- Thailand
  - Democrat Party
  - Palang Pracharath Party
- Turkey:
  - Justice and Development Party
  - Future Party

=== U ===
- United Kingdom:
  - Conservative Party
  - UK Independence Party
  - Ulster Unionist Party (Northern Ireland)
  - Democratic Unionist Party (Northern Ireland)
  - Traditional Unionist Voice (Northern Ireland)
  - Reform UK
- United States:
  - Alaskan Independence Party
  - American Constitution Party
  - American Freedom Party
  - American Independent Party
  - American Party
  - American Solidarity Party
  - Christian Liberty Party
  - Conservative Party of New York State
  - Constitution Party
  - Independent Party of Connecticut
  - Prohibition Party
  - Republican Party
- Uruguay:
  - National Party

=== V ===
- Vanuatu:
  - Land and Justice Party
  - Reunification Movement for Change
  - Union of Moderate Parties

== Organizations ==
- International Democrat Union
- Democrat Union of Africa
- Union of Latin American Parties
- Asia Pacific Democrat Union
- Caribbean Democrat Union

== See also ==
- List of Christian democratic parties
- Centrist Democrat International
- Lists of political parties
