= Conservative Women's Organisation =

Women's wing of the British Conservative Party in England, Wales and Northern Ireland

- Full name: Conservative Women's Organisation
- Short name: CWO
- President: Pamela Hall OBE
- Chairman: Louise Brice
- Deputy: Tracy Stones
- Deputy: Hilary Scott
- Deputy: Alix Matheson
- Founded: 1919
- Headquarters: Conservative Campaign HQ; 1/2 Castle Lane, London, SW1E 6DR, England
- Ideology: Conservatism (British); British unionism
- Political position: Centre-right to right-wing
- National affiliation: Conservative Party
- International affiliation: International Women's Democrat Union

Website
- conservativewomen.uk

The Conservative Women's Organisation (CWO) represents the female members of the Conservative Party in England, Wales, and Northern Ireland.

Conservative Women's Organisation Scotland operates in Scotland. The Chair of CWO Scotland sits on the CWO National Executive.

The youth wing of Conservative Women's Organisation is called Conservative Young Women.

As with all political parties, membership has declined and the CWO had about 5,000 active members in 2012 (although not all women party members are actually CWO members, they must join separately). Attendance at the CWO Annual Conference has been between 300 and 750 in the past five years.

It also sends delegates to the National Conservative Convention, the parliament of the party's voluntary wing (Voluntary Party).

== History ==
CWO Supplementary Logo for the organisation's centenary in 2019

The National Union of Conservative and Unionist Associations' Central Women's Advisory Committee (CWAC) was formed in 1908 and officially founded in 1919, although not affiliated to the Conservative Party until 1928. Its roots go back to the Grand Ladies Council of the Primrose League of 1885. It changed its name to the Women's National Advisory Committee (WNAC) in 1951 and again to the Conservative Women's National Committee (CWNC) in April 1982. It changed to its current title in April 2007.

In the latter half of the 20th century, the CWO had more than a quarter of a million members and became the largest women's political organisation in the Western world. For several decades, the women's organisation's annual conference was regularly held in the Royal Albert Hall in London.

The CWO celebrated its centenary in 2019 at its conference at Methodist Hall in London on 9 March 2019. The organisation created a supplementary centenary logo, which includes a primrose, in reference to its roots in the Primrose League – and uses the suffragette colours of purple, white and green.

== Purpose ==
According to its website, the CWO is:

- The grassroots network that provides support and focus for women in the Conservative Party
- Reaching out to women in all parts of the community
- Campaigning on issues of particular concern to women both nationally and internationally
- Encouraging women to be politically active and to get elected at all levels
- Ensuring that the women's perspective is taken into account because women see things differently from men
- Helping the Conservative Party capture the women's vote

== Organisation ==
=== National Executive ===
Conservative Women's Organisation

National Chairman
- Incumbent
- Assumed office March 2024
- Incumbent: Louise Brice
- Preceded by: Pamela Hall OBE
- Website: Official webpage

The CWO Executive Committee has responsibility for the overall management of the organisation and is composed of:

- CWO officers (president, chairman, 3 deputy chairmen, treasurer and deputy chairman Europe)
- European Union of Women (EUW) British Section Officers
- The 12 regional chairmen plus 2 additional executive members (AEMs) per region
- Up to 8 co-options
- Up to 8 additional members

=== National officers ===
The national officers for 2024/7 are:

Position	Name	Since
National President	Pamela Hall OBE	2024
National Chairman	Louise Brice	2024
National Deputy Chairman	Tracy Stones	2024
National Deputy Chairman	Hilary Scott	2024
National Deputy Chairman	Alix Matheson	2024
National Treasurer	Laura Evans	2024

=== Regions ===
- East Midlands
- Eastern
- London
- North East
- North West
- Northern Ireland
- Scotland (as Scottish Conservative Women)
- South West
- Southern
- Wales
- West Midlands
- Yorkshire

Each of the 12 regions are broken into Areas (roughly by county), with each having their own Area Chairman with responsibility to the Regional Chairmen. An affiliated (or recognised) Conservative Association women's group, known as Association CWOs or Conservative Women's Constituency Committees (CWCCs).

=== Affiliation and constitution ===
The organisation is officially affiliated to the Conservative Party. Its last constitution was ratified by the CWO AGM in March 2007 and ratified by the Party Board on 7 April 2007. A revised constitution was ratified by the CWO AGM on 29 March 2014 and ratified by the Party Board on 28 April 2014.

=== Elections ===
National and Regional elections take place at Annual General Meetings before 30 April each year.

== Policy and research ==
=== CWO Forums ===
Although the organisation primarily represents the views of the women grassroots members of the Conservative Party, it is also involved in policy and research, which particularly affect women in the UK. It does this primarily through its CWO Forums – panel based discussion meetings that are generally held in the Palace of Westminster and which are open to men and women, and to people from all political persuasions.

Subjects covered in the last five years include:

- Human Trafficking
- Sexual Exploitation
- Policing
- 'Big Brother' Syndrome
- Animal Welfare
- Drugs
- Immigration/Asylum
- Environment
- Criminal Justice System
- Food Labelling
- Housing/Planning
- Mental Health
- Pensions
- Europe
- Forced Marriages
- Prostitution
- Gang Culture
- Iraq & Afghanistan
- Cyber Bullying
- Local Government
- Taxation
- Stalking
- Rural Poverty

=== CWO Development ===
Set up by the then chairman, Pauline Lucas, in 2010, the development programme mentors and develops women to stand for public office at all levels. Workshops are usually held at the Conservative Campaign Headquarters in London but sponsored Be a Councillor days are held around the UK. Workshops cover communication, interviews, applications, campaigns and finance, together with other "transferable skills". In July 2013, the CWO announced a new workshop as an introduction for women to apply for Public Appointments and Non-Executive Director roles.

== Conferences ==
The first recorded Conservative Women's Conference was in 1921 and holding an annual conference is part of its constitution. For several decades, the women's organisation's annual conference was regularly held in the Royal Albert Hall.

== National CWO Chairmen ==
Years	Chair
1919-1921	Lady Fitzalan [Lady Edmund Talbot, formerly Lady Mary Bertie]
1921-1925	Mrs W. Bridgeman [Caroline Bridgeman, The Viscountess Bridgeman DBE]
1925-1928	Viscountess Elveden
1928-1932	Countess of Iveagh
1933-1935	Dame Regina Evans
1935-1938	Lady Hillingdon
1938-1942	Mrs Marian Whitehead
1942-1945	Mrs Hornyold-Strickland
1945-1948	Dame Lucile Sayers [Elsewhere listed as Mrs Lorne Sayers]
1948-1951	Mrs Anne Warde
1951-1954	Evelyn Emmet, Baroness Emmet of Amberley [Otherwise described as Mrs TA Emmet]
1954-1957	Katharine Elliot, The Baroness Elliot of Harwood DBE [otherwise described as Mrs Walter Elliot]
1957-1960	Lady Mary Graham
1960-1963	Dame Margaret Shepherd [Otherwise described as Peggy Shepherd]
1963-1966	Mrs CJA Doughty [later, Dame Adelaide Doughty]
1966-1969	Dame Unity Lister
1969-1972	Dame Margot Smith [Otherwise described as Mrs Roy Smith]
1972-1975	Dame Shelagh Roberts
1975-1978	Dame Ann Springman [listed as Margaret Springham in the Times]
1978-1981	Dame Pamela Hunter [Otherwise described as Mrs Gordon Hunter]
1981-1984	Joan Seccombe, The Baroness Seccombe DBE
1984-1987	Dame Margaret Fry
1987-1990	Dame Wendy Mitchell
1990-1993	Mrs Hazel Byford, The Baroness Byford DBE
1993-1996	Dame Joyce Annelay, The Baroness Anelay of St Johns DBE
1996-1999	Mrs Caroline Abel-Smith OBE
1999-2002	Mrs Marney Swan OBE
2002-2005	Mrs Pamela Parker
2005-2008	Lady Fiona Hodgson, The Baroness Hodgson of Abinger CBE
2008-2011	Mrs Pauline Lucas MBE
2011-2012	Ms Niki Molnar MBE
Mar-Nov 2012	Mrs Katy Bourne
2013-2016	Ms Niki Molnar MBE
2016-2019	Mrs Julie Iles OBE
2019-2021	Mrs Fleur Butler
2022-2024	Ms Pamela Hall OBE
2024-	Mrs Louise Brice

Party political offices
Preceded by Pamela Hall OBE	Louise Brice, Chairman; 2024 – present	Incumbent

Party political offices
Preceded by Eve Burt MBE, President	Pamela Hall OBE; 2024 – present	Incumbent
