= Political symbolism =

Symbolism used to represent a political standpoint

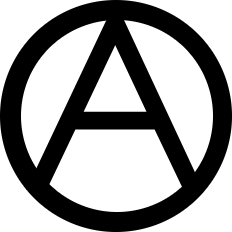
Circle-A, associated with anarchism.

Political symbolism is symbolism that is used to represent a political standpoint or party.

== Overview ==
Political symbols simplify and “summarize” the political structures and practices for which they stand; can connect institutions and beliefs with emotions; can help make a polity or political movement more cohesive. A political symbol can be defined as a solid object, such as a word, person, image, artifact, or action, whose political importance cannot be obtained solely from its physical assets. People fit themselves to words as much as they bend them to their own purposes. Political symbols help individuals understand political complexities by organizing information into different categories. Labels such as "conservative" and "liberal" are cognitive shortcuts that enable individuals to associate these words with different ideologies. Different groups and individuals can interpret symbols differently because they all have the capacity to create the virtual reality within which they operate. The symbolism can occur in various media including banners, pictures, and flags. For example, Red flags have traditionally been flown by socialists, left-wing radicals, and communist groups to represent the "blood of the workers". Black flags have traditionally been flown by anarchism, and left-wing radicals to represent the absence of all oppressive structures. A combination of the two colors in a black flag represents social anarchism, such as anarchist communism and anarcho-syndicalism. References to words such as "free market" and "limited government" automatically signal to republican ideology

Color has been associated with symbolic value. Japanese, Americans, and Navajos have agreed that colorful symbols usually represent energy and happiness, whilst colorless symbols represent sadness. Symbols relating to activity are usually warm colors, like orange, red and yellow, as well as irregular lines; passivity can be represented by paler colors like baby pink and blue, it is also represented by simple and big "curvilinear" shapes. Patterns that are dark, massive, and active mean disorder; whilst straight, simple, and geometrical mean order. Strength can be represented with massive fonts, bright and extreme colors; whilst weakness can be represented with smaller lines and small contrasts. Many groups use the political colour associated with their political philosophy, for example blue, particularly dark blue, is often associated with conservative parties. Political culture is reproduced through repeating symbolic patterns that are intertwined with language and political communication. These symbolic presence persist over time, they help with stabilizing expectations about authority and political conflict.

Cultural groups may use symbols in what many consider to be a political way, for example LGBT symbols like the Rainbow flag are used to promote the political goal of LGBT rights. Individual parties often associate, officially or unofficially, with symbols — sometimes adopting or incorporating symbolism associated with ideologies they support. In some democracies these symbols are regulated by law, for example, in the United Kingdom, political symbols are regulated by the Electoral Commission. In some countries, political symbols appear on ballot papers. These are known as electoral symbols and one of their functions is to help illiterate voters identify parties.

== History/Origin of Symbols ==
Political symbolism can be traced back to ancient city-states, in which symbols were tied to governance and identity. Political theorizing began in city-states in Greece (polis), where symbols were tied to civic identity and democratic participation. Each city-state would develop their own emblems and iconography to easily distinguish themselves from other city-states and to reinforce their governing ideals. The Romans expanded political symbolism on a much bigger scale. The eagle (aquila) represented Roman military and imperial power; the fasces symbolized the authority of the Roman magistrates. Other forms of political communication in ancient Rome consist of imperial portraitures on monuments, coins, and public buildings. This projected power and legitimacy of rulers across territories.

== Theoretical Importance ==
Political Symbols play an important role in making political communities psychologically and emotionally meaningful and important to their members. Entities like "the state" are abstract roles and cannot be directly perceived by individuals; they must be represented symbolically in order to be understood and emotionally welcomed by individuals. Politics are crucial for the unification of communities; symbols work as a way to connect individuals to their beliefs. Political communities are dependent on symbolic representation because most individuals cannot directly interact with the nation or state they are a part of. Symbols such as flags, national documents, or narratives make political authority emotionally meaningful to its citizens, this enables political agreement. Political symbols function simultaneously at individual and societal levels. They act as psychological stimuli for individuals; while also contributing to political culture. Symbols link small-scaled political behavior with big-scale social order.

== See also ==
- Anarchist symbolism
- Communist symbolism
- Fascist symbolism
- List of ideological symbols
- List of symbols
- Political myth
- Political religion
- Socialist heraldry
