= Loughnane =

Loughnane is an Irish surname. It is derived from the Irish Gaelic Ó Lachtnáin 'descendant of Lachtnán', a given name meaning 'gray'.

== People with surname ==
- Bill Loughnane (1915–1982), Irish politician
- Billy Loughnane (born 2006), Irish jockey
- Brian Loughnane (born 1957), Australian businessman and political advisor
- Francis Loughnane (born 1945), Irish hurler
- Ger Loughnane (born 1953), Irish hurler
- Lee Loughnane (born 1946), American musician and songwriter
- Michael Loughnane (1867-?), Australian politician
- Olive Loughnane (born 1976), Irish race walker
- Susan Loughnane (born 1987), Irish actress, author, and model
