= Front for Democracy =

Front for Democracy Frente por la Democracia
- Abbreviation: El Frente, FPD
- Founded: 2002 (as "Transparency")
- Dissolved: 2007
- Split from: Guatemalan Christian Democracy
- Ideology: Direct democracy Christian democracy
- Political position: Centre to centre-left (Note: Also called centre-right and left-wing)
- Colors: green

The Front for Democracy (Frente por la Democracia or El Frente) was a political party in Guatemala. In the legislative elections held on 9 September 2007, the party secured 0.91% of the votes in the race for national-list deputies and held no seats in the 2008-12 Congress.
