= Brian Loughnane =

Australian business and political strategic adviser (born 1957)

Brian Loughnane AO
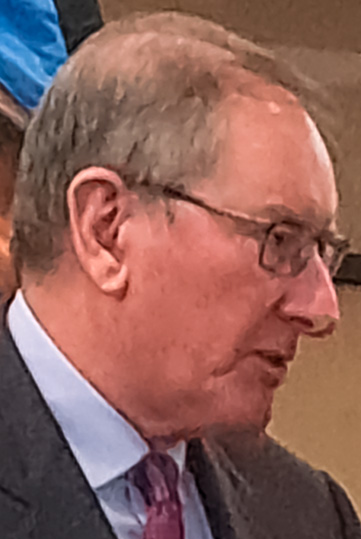
- Loughnane in 2022

Deputy Chairman of the International Democracy Union
- Incumbent
- Assumed office April 2019
- Preceded by: Tony Clement

Personal details
- Born: Brian Gerard Loughnane; 11 November 1957 (age 68) Geelong, Victoria, Australia
- Party: Liberal
- Spouse: Peta Credlin (m. 2002)
- Education: La Trobe University
- Occupation: Political adviser
- Website: www.liberal.org.au

Brian Gerard Loughnane (born 11 November 1957) is an Australian business and political strategic adviser. He was the federal director of the Liberal Party of Australia from February 2003 until January 2016 and campaign director for the centre-right Liberal-National Coalition in the 2004, 2007, 2010 and 2013 federal elections in Australia. Loughnane is Deputy Chairman of the International Democracy Union since April 2019.

== Early life and education ==
Brian Loughnane was born in Geelong, Victoria in November 1957 and was educated in Colac before graduating with an honours degree in political science from La Trobe University in 1981.

== Career ==
=== Early career ===
Loughnane commenced his business career with Shell Australia in 1982, and was responsible for industrial relations at the Geelong oil refinery during the introduction of enterprise bargaining.

=== Political career ===
In 1992, he was appointed as Senior Advisor to Vin Heffernan, the Minister for Small Business in the Kennett government. In 1994 he became chief of staff to Alexander Downer, the federal Leader of the Opposition. When John Howard succeeded Downer as Opposition Leader in early 1995, Loughnane was appointed as Howard's Chief of Staff, serving until May 1995, before appointment to a senior executive role with Gas and Fuel Corporation for twelve months. He returned to politics in 1996 and served as Chief of Staff to John Moore in his capacities as Minister for Industry, Science and Tourism and as Minister for Defence.

From October 2000 to February 2003 Loughnane was State Director of the Victorian Division of the Liberal Party. He was Campaign Director for the 2001 by-election for the federal Division of Aston (Liberal retain) and the 2002 Victorian state election.

In late 2002 Loughnane was appointed Federal Director of the Liberal Party of Australia and served as Campaign Director for the Coalition parties at the federal elections held in 2004 (Coalition returned with increased majority), 2007 (Labor win), 2010 (Labor minority) and 2013 (Coalition win). He retired as Federal Director of the Liberal Party in February 2016.

Loughnane has extensive international political experience with major centre-right parties around the world. He attended the first Convention of the Conservative Party of Canada and has had a close working relationship with senior Canadian political figures for many years. In 2016, he was asked to conduct a review of the 2015 national election campaign for the Conservative Party of Canada.

Loughnane has been Deputy Chairman of the International Democrat Union since April 2019, was previously Assistant Chairman, and in 2015 was appointed to the International Republican Institute International Advisory Board.

Loughnane is the president of the Victorian Liberal Party.

== Personal life ==
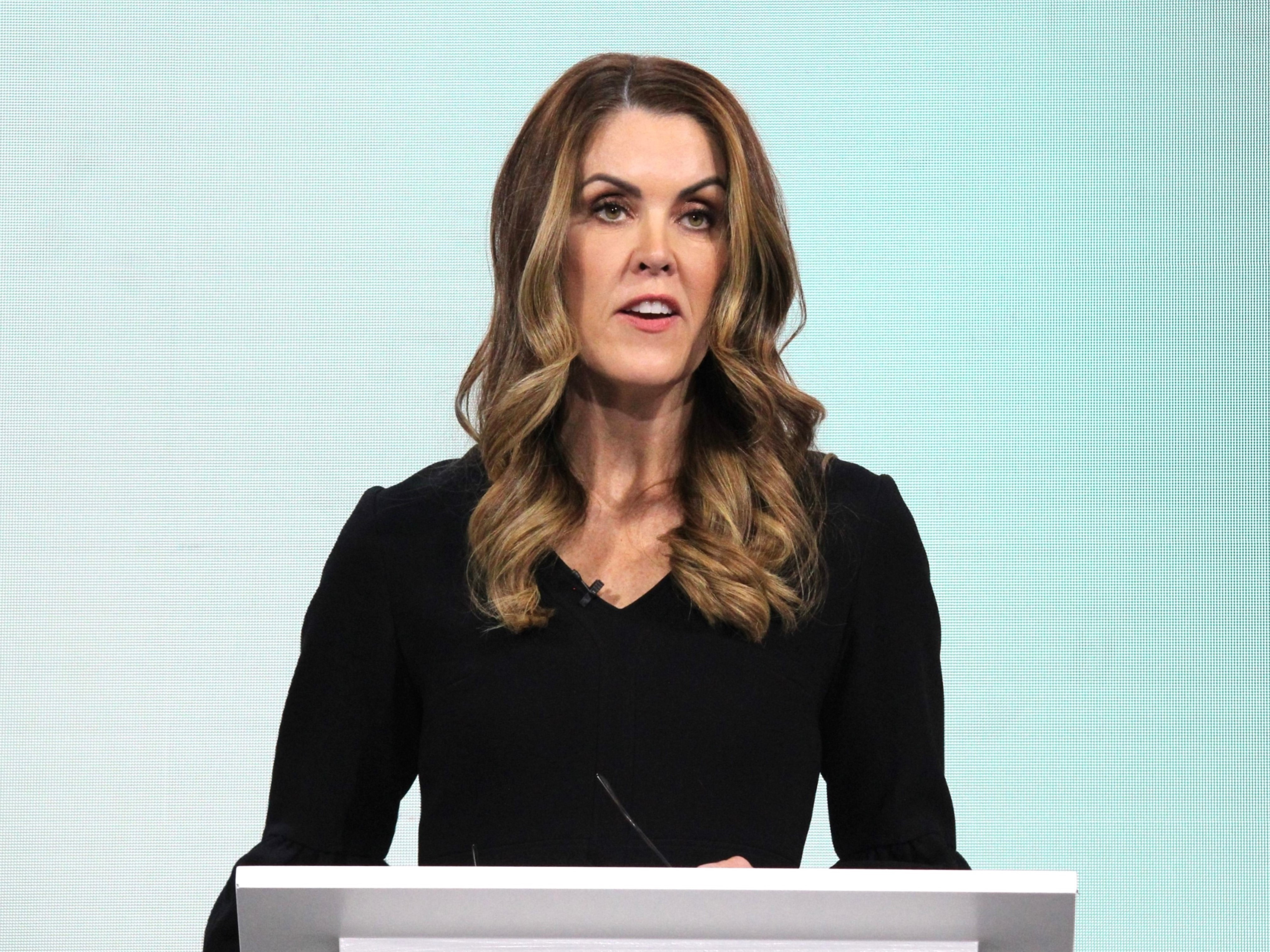
Peta Credlin, Loughnane's wife, in 2025

Loughnane is married to Peta Credlin, the former Chief of Staff to Tony Abbott, former Prime Minister of Australia.

He became an Officer in the Order of Australia on Australia Day 2018.
