= Union of Latin American Parties =

Regional affiliation of International Democrat Union

Union of Latin American Parties Unión de Partidos Latinoamericanos
- Abbreviation: UPLA
- President: Julian Obiglio
- Vice Presidents: Andrea Ojeda; Álvaro Arzú; Guido Chiriboga; Anibal Zapattini
- Executive director: Nicolás Figari
- Founded: 22 November 1992
- Headquarters: Santiago, Chile
- Ideology: Conservatism
- Political position: Centre-right to right-wing
- International affiliation: International Democracy Union

Website
- uplalatinoamerica.org

The Union of Latin American Parties (Spanish: Unión de Partidos Latinoamericanos, Portuguese: União de Partidos Latino-Americanos) is an alliance of center-right to right-wing political parties in Latin America, Germany, and Spain. It is affiliated with the global International Democrat Union.

UPLA has twenty-nine member parties (and one coalition of human rights groups) organized across 21 countries.

== Ideology ==
The organization is committed to promoting and defending liberty, democracy and the rule of law in the region. It seeks to strengthen the regional presence of the International Democratic Union (IDU) on the American continent and to promote and defend the ideas and values of said organization.

== Member parties ==
Country	Party	Abbr	Color	Upper house legislative seats	Lower house legislative seats	Status
Argentina	Republican Proposal	PRO	Yellow	3 / 72	12 / 257	Parliamentary support
Bolivia	Democrat Social Movement	MDS	Red, green	2 / 36	17 / 130	Parliamentary support
Bolivia	Solidarity Civic Unity	UCS	Sky blue, white	0 / 36	0 / 130	Extra-parliamentary Independent
Brazil	Brazil Union	UNIÃO	Blue, yellow, white, sky blue	9 / 81	59 / 513	Independent
Chile	Independent Democratic Union	UDI	Blue, white, yellow	5 / 50	18 / 155	In government
Chile	National Renewal	RN	Blue, white, red	10 / 50	13 / 155	In government
Colombia	Colombian Conservative Party	PCC	Blue	10 / 108	19 / 172	Independent
Colombia	Democratic Center	CD	Light blue, yellow, red	17 / 108	30 / 172	In opposition
Costa Rica	Social Christian Republican Party	PRSC	Blue, red, yellow	Unicameral legislature only	0 / 57	Extra-parliamentary Independent
Costa Rica	Social Christian Unity Party	PUSC	Blue, red	Unicameral legislature only	1 / 57	In opposition
Cuba	Christian Democratic Party of Cuba	PDC	Green	Unicameral legislature only	0 / 470	Extra-parliamentary opposition
Dominican Republic	National Progressive Force	FNP	Blue and White	0 / 32	0 / 190	Extra-parliamentary opposition
Dominican Republic	Social Christian Reformist Party	PRSC	Red	1 / 32	4 / 190	In government
Ecuador	Social Christian Party	PSC	Yellow, red	Unicameral legislature only	4 / 151	Independent
Ecuador	Creating Opportunities	CREO	Yellow, blue, orange, light blue	Unicameral legislature only	0 / 151	Extra-parliamentary Independent
El Salvador	Nationalist Republican Alliance	ARENA	Blue, white, and red	Unicameral legislature only	2 / 60	In opposition
Germany	Christian Social Union in Bavaria	CSU	Blue	4 / 69	44 / 630	In government
Guatemala	Unionist Party	PU	Black, rainbow	Unicameral legislature only	2 / 160	Independent
Guatemala	Valor	VALOR	Turquoise, gray	Unicameral legislature only	11 / 160	Independent
Honduras	National Party of Honduras	PNH	Blue	Unicameral legislature only	49 / 128	In government
Nicaragua	Conservative Party (Note: Despite being dissolved, this party is listed in the member's list of the UPLA website.)	PC	Green	Unicameral legislature only	0 / 92	Dissolved
Panama	Democratic Change	CD	Cyan, pink, white	Unicameral legislature only	8 / 71	Parliamentary support
Paraguay	Colorado Party	PC	Red, white	24 / 45	48 / 80	In government
Peru	Popular Force	FP	Orange, black	22 / 60	41 / 130	In government
Peru	Christian People's Party	PPC	Green	0 / 60	0 / 130	Extra-parliamentary government
Spain	People's Party	PP	Sky blue	145 / 266	137 / 350	In opposition
Uruguay	National Party (Uruguay)	PN	Sky blue, White	9 / 30	29 / 99	In opposition
Venezuela	Citizen Encounter	EC	Blue	Unicameral legislature only	0 / 285	Extra-parliamentary opposition
Venezuela	Project Venezuela	PV	Yellow	Unicameral legislature only	0 / 285	Extra-parliamentary opposition

== Non-party members ==
- Assembly of the Cuban Resistance
