= European Democrat Union =

Centre-right political international in Europe

- Formation: 24 April 1978
- Defunct: 1998
- Parent organization: International Democrat Union
- Affiliations: European People's Party

The European Democrat Union (EDU) was one of the three European wings of the International Democrat Union, along with the European People's Party (EPP) and the European Conservatives and Reformists Party (ECR Party). Its members included Christian democratic, liberal conservative, and conservative political parties.

Most EDU members were also members of the EPP, but the group also included 'unattached' conservatives that were unaffiliated to the EPP. These were: the British Conservative Party, the Czech Civic Democratic Party, the Icelandic Independence Party and the Liechtenstein Patriotic Union and Progressive Citizens' Party.

The Secretary of EDU in the 1990s was Andreas Khol. One of the last conferences 17th EDU Conference were held in 12–13 March 1996 in Paris. In the late 1990s, the last chairman of an independent EDU, Finnish conservative politician Sauli Niinistö, negotiated the merger of the EDU into the EPP. In October 2002, the EDU ceased its activities after being formally absorbed by the EPP at a special event in Estoril, Portugal. In recognition of his efforts, Niinistö was elected Honorary President of the EPP in the same year. Moreover, in April 2008, the EPP was recognized as a Regional Union by the IDU.

== Member parties ==
Party	Country
Austrian People's Party	Austria
Centre Agreement	Poland
Conservative Party	United Kingdom
Conservative Party	Norway
Civic Democratic Party	Czech Republic
Christian and Democratic Union – Czechoslovak People's Party	Czech Republic
Civic Democratic Alliance	Czech Republic
Christian Democratic Party	Czech Republic
Christian Democratic Movement	Slovakia
Christian Democratic Appeal	Netherlands
Croatian Democratic Union	Croatia
Christian Democratic Union	Germany
Christian Social Union in Bavaria	Germany
CDS – People's Party	Portugal
Social Democratic Party	Portugal
Conservative People's Party	Denmark
Union of Democratic Forces	Bulgaria
Democratic Party	Bulgaria
New Democratic Party	Serbia
Democratic Rally	Cyprus
Democratic Party	Albania
Forza Italia	Italia
Freedom Union	Poland
Fidesz	Hungary
Fine Gael	Ireland
Hungarian Democratic Forum	Hungary
Homeland Union	Lithuania
Independence Party	Iceland
Liberal Democratic Congress	Poland
Moderate Party	Sweden
New Democracy	Greece
National Coalition Party	Finland
Rally for the Republic	France
Pro Patria Union	Estonia
Patriotic Union	Liechtenstein
Progressive Citizens' Party	Liechtenstein
People's Party	Latvia
People's Party	Spain
Slovenian Democratic Party	Slovenia
True Path Party	Turkey
Motherland Party	Turkey
