= International Women's Democracy Union =

Center-right political women organization

The International Women Democracy Union, abbreviated to IWDU, is the women's wing of the International Democrat Union, the political international for centre-right political parties. It was known as the International Women Democrat Union until September 2023.
