= Asia Pacific Democracy Union =

Centre-right political international in Asia Pacific

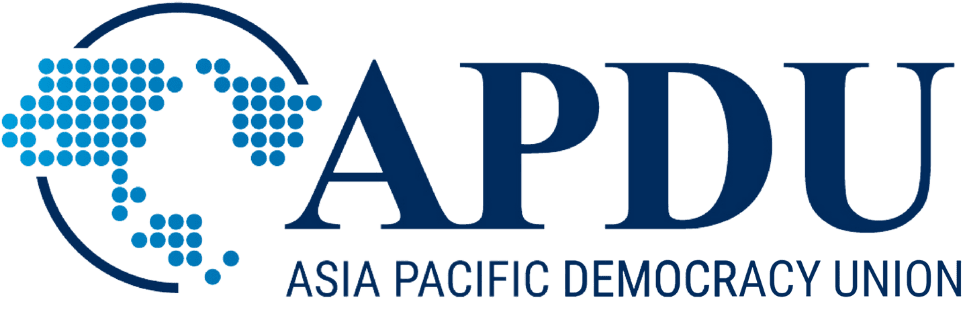
- Formation: June 1982
- Type: Regional organization
- Legal status: Active
- Purpose: Conservatism
- Headquarters: Sri Jayawardenapura Kotte, Sri Lanka
- Region served: Asia-Pacific
- Chairwoman: Judith Collins
- Parent organization: International Democracy Union
- Website: apdemocracy.com

The Asia Pacific Democracy Union (APDU) is a regional association of centre-right and right-wing political parties associated with the International Democracy Union (IDU). It aims to promote freedom and free enterprise by considering matters of political organization and policy of interest to member parties.

== Members ==
| Country | Party | Abbr. | Colour | Legislative seats | | Status |
| Country | Party | Abbr. | Colour | Lower House | Upper House | Status |
|---|---|---|---|---|---|---|
| Australia | Liberal | LPA | Blue | 27 / 150 | 23 / 76 | In opposition |
| Canada | Conservative; Parti conservateur du Canada | CPC; PCC | Blue | 141 / 338 | 13 / 105 | In opposition |
| Republic of China | Kuomintang 中國國民黨 | KMT | Blue | 53 / 113 | | In opposition |
| South Korea | People Power 국민의힘 | PPP | Red | 107 / 300 | | In opposition |
| Maldives | Democratic ދިވެހިރައްޔިތުންގެ ޑިމޮކްރެޓިކް ޕާޓީ | MDP | Yellow | 12 / 93 | | In opposition |
| Mongolia | Democratic; Монголын Ардчилсан Нам | AN | Sky blue | 42 / 126 | | In opposition |
| Nepal | Rastriya Prajatantra राष्ट्रिय प्रजातन्त्र पार्टी | RPP | Gold | 5 / 275 | 0 / 59 | In opposition |
| New Zealand | National; Rōpū Nāhinara o Aotearoa | NAT | Blue | 49 / 123 | | In government (Coalition) |
| Sri Lanka | United National එක්සත් ජාතික පක්ෂය ஐக்கிய தேசியக் கட்சி | UNP | Green | 2 / 225 | | In opposition |
| United States | Republican | R/GOP | Red | 219 / 435 | 53 / 100 | In government |

== List of chairpersons of APDU ==
- Former Sri Lankan President Ranil Wickramasinghe served as the chairperson of the APDU from 2005 to 5 April 2024.
- Former New Zealand Attorney-General Judith Collins serves as chairperson of the APDU since 5 April 2024.
