= Caribbean Democrat Union =

Centre-right political international in Caribbean

The Caribbean Democrat Union is an alliance of moderate, centre-right and conservative political parties and individuals the Caribbean. It is affiliated to the global International Democracy Union.

== Member parties/individuals ==
Country	Party/Individual	Abbr	Color	Upper house legislative seats	Lower house legislative seats	Status
Anguilla	Palmavon Webster	N/A	Pink	0 / 13 (0%)		No representation
Belize	United Democratic Party	UDP	Red	3 / 13 (23%)	5 / 31 (16%)	In opposition
Dominica	Dominica Freedom Party	DFP	Green	0 / 21 (0%)		No representation
Grenada	New National Party	NNP	Green	3 / 13 (23%)	6 / 15 (40%)	In opposition
Jamaica	Jamaica Labour Party	JLP	Green	13 / 21 (62%)	35 / 63 (56%)	In government
Saint Kitts and Nevis	People's Action Movement	PAM	Gold	4 / 11 (36%)		In opposition
Saint Lucia	United Workers Party	UWP	Yellow	3 / 11 (27%)	2 / 17 (12%)	In opposition
Saint Vincent and the Grenadines	New Democratic Party	NDP	Yellow	14 / 15 (93%)		In government
Turks and Caicos Islands	People's Democratic Movement	PDM	Blue	1 / 15 (7%)		In opposition
