= International Democracy Union =

International alliance of right-of-centre political parties

- Abbreviation: IDU
- Formation: 24 June 1983; 43 years ago
- Purpose: World federation of centre-right/right-wing to far-right political parties
- Headquarters: Munich, Bavaria, Germany
- Region served: Worldwide
- Members: 84 political parties and 8 organisations
- Official language: English
- Chairman: Stephen Harper (Conservative Party of Canada)
- Deputy Chairman: Brian Loughnane (Liberal Party of Australia)
- Website: idu.org
- Formerly called: International Democrat Union (until 2023)

The International Democracy Union (IDU; known as the International Democrat Union until September 2023) is an international alliance of mostly centre-right political parties. Headquartered in Munich, Germany, the IDU consists of 84 full and associate members from 65 countries. It is chaired by Stephen Harper, former prime minister of Canada. It has three affiliated international organizations (International Young Democrat Union, International Women's Democracy Union and SME Global) and six affiliated regional organizations (Union of Latin American Parties, Asia Pacific Democrat Union, Caribbean Democrat Union, Democrat Union of Africa, European People's Party and European Conservatives and Reformists Party).

The IDU allows conservative political parties around the world to establish contacts and discuss different views on public policy and related matters. Their stated goal is the promotion of "democracy and [of] centre-right policies around the globe". The IDU has some overlap of member parties with the Centrist Democrat International (CDI), but the CDI is more centrist, Christian democrat and communitarian than the IDU.

The group was founded in 1983 as the umbrella organisation for the European Democrat Union (EDU), Caribbean Democrat Union (CDU), and the Asia Pacific Democrat Union (APDU). Created at the instigation of the Konrad Adenauer Foundation and U.S. Vice President George H. W. Bush, the organisation was founded at a joint meeting of the EDU and APDU in London, United Kingdom.

== Founding ==
The IDU was founded in London on 24 June 1983. According to Richard V. Allen, to be admitted as a member, a party must qualify as a "mainstream conservative" party influenced by classical liberalism.

The founding declaration was signed by 19 persons:

Person	Party	Country
Alois Mock	Austrian People's Party	Austria
Margaret Thatcher	Conservative Party	United Kingdom
Helmut Kohl	Christian Democratic Union of Germany	West Germany
Franz Josef Strauss	Christian Social Union in Bavaria	West Germany
Jacques Chirac	Rally for the Republic	France
Andrew Peacock	Liberal Party of Australia	Australia
Evangelos Averoff-Tossizza	New Democracy	Greece
Manuel Fraga	People's Alliance	Spain
Oscar Alzaga	People's Democratic Party	Spain
Susanne Wood	New Zealand National Party	New Zealand
Glafcos Clerides	Democratic Rally	Cyprus
Ilkka Suominen	National Coalition Party	Finland
Lucas Pires	CDS – People's Party	Portugal
Tatsuo Tanaka	Liberal Democratic Party	Japan
Ulf Adelsohn	Moderate Party	Sweden
Erik Nielsen	Progressive Conservative Party of Canada	Canada
Poul Schlüter	Conservative People's Party	Denmark
Jo Benkow	Conservative Party	Norway
Frank Fahrenkopf	Republican Party	United States

== History and activities ==
According to a 1985 CIA memo, the Republican Party and the Liberal Democratic Party of Japan had provided half of all funding for the organization at the time. Several leaders of member parties had gained political power with help from Arthur J. Finkelstein, such as Viktor Orbán, Benjamin Netanyahu and Donald Trump. The IDU shares resources with its members on "campaign technology, fund-raising techniques, opinion polling, advertising and campaign organization". The Conservative Party of Canada and the Republican Party had closely collaborated on resources and strategy during the 2000s and 2010s.

== Member parties ==
=== Full members ===
Country	Party	Abbreviation	Government	Lower Chamber	Upper Chamber
Albania	Democratic Party of Albania	PD	Opposition	59 / 140 (42%)	
Albania	Republican Party of Albania	PR	Opposition	2 / 140 (1%)	
Argentina	Republican Proposal	PRO	Support	37 / 257 (14%)	6 / 72 (8%)
Australia	Liberal Party of Australia	LIB	Opposition	28 / 150 (19%)	25 / 76 (33%)
Austria	Austrian People's Party	ÖVP	Government	51 / 183 (28%)	22 / 60 (37%)
Azerbaijan	Azerbaijan National Independence Party	AMIP	Support	1 / 125 (0.8%)	
Belarus	The BPF Party	BPF	Extraparliamentary opposition	0 / 110 (0%)	
Belarus	United Civic Party	UCP	Extraparliamentary opposition	0 / 110 (0%)	
Belgium	New Flemish Alliance	N-VA	Government	24 / 150 (16%)	9 / 60 (15%)
Bolivia	Social Democratic Movement	MDS	Government	39 / 130 (30%)	12 / 36 (33%)
Bosnia and Herzegovina	Party of Democratic Progress	PDP	Opposition	2 / 42 (5%)	1 / 15 (7%)
Bosnia and Herzegovina	Croatian Democratic Union of Bosnia and Herzegovina	HDZ	Government	4 / 42 (10%)	3 / 15 (20%)
Brazil	Brazil Union	UNIÃO	Independent	59 / 513 (12%)	7 / 81 (9%)
Bulgaria	GERB	GERB	Opposition	39 / 240 (16%)	
Canada	Conservative Party of Canada	CPC / PCC	Opposition	140 / 343 (41%)	14 / 105 (13%)
Chile	Independent Democratic Union	UDI	Government	18 / 155 (12%)	5 / 50 (10%)
Chile	National Renewal	RN	Government	13 / 155 (8%)	8 / 50 (16%)
Costa Rica	Social Christian Unity Party	PUSC	Opposition	9 / 57 (16%)	
Colombia	Colombian Conservative Party	PCC	Government	20 / 183 (11%)	10 / 103 (10%)
Cyprus	Democratic Rally	DISY	Government	17 / 56 (30%)	
Czech Republic	Civic Democratic Party	ODS	Opposition	34 / 200 (17%)	21 / 81 (26%)
Czech Republic	TOP 09	TOP 09	Opposition	14 / 200 (7%)	4 / 81 (5%)
Croatia	Croatian Democratic Union	HDZ	Government	55 / 151 (36%)	
Cuba	Christian Democratic Party of Cuba	PDC	Extraparliamentary opposition	0 / 470 (0%)	
Cuba	Assembly of the Cuban Resistance	ACR	Extraparliamentary opposition	0 / 470 (0%)	
Denmark	Conservative People's Party	DKF	Opposition	13 / 179 (7%)	
Dominican Republic	National Progressive Force	FNP	Extraparliamentary opposition	0 / 190 (0%)	0 / 32 (0%)
Ecuador	Creating Opportunities	CREO	Extraparliamentary opposition	0 / 137 (0%)	
El Salvador	Nationalist Republican Alliance	ARENA	Opposition	2 / 60 (3%)	
Estonia	Isamaa		Opposition	10 / 101 (10%)	
Finland	National Coalition Party	Kok	Government	48 / 200 (24%)	
Georgia	United National Movement	UNM	Opposition	15 / 150 (10%)	
Germany	Christian Democratic Union of Germany	CDU	Government	164 / 630 (26%)	22 / 69 (32%)
Germany	Christian Social Union in Bavaria	CSU	Government	44 / 630 (7%)	4 / 69 (6%)
Ghana	New Patriotic Party	NPP	Opposition	88 / 275 (32%)	
Greece	New Democracy	ND	Government	156 / 300 (52%)	
Grenada	New National Party	NNP	Opposition	5 / 15 (33%)	3 / 13 (23%)
Guatemala	Unionist Party	PU	Opposition	2 / 160 (1%)	
Iceland	Independence Party		Opposition	14 / 63 (22%)	
Israel	Likud	Likud	Government	32 / 120 (27%)	
Italy	Forza Italia	FI	Government	46 / 400 (12%)	20 / 200 (10%)
Italy	Brothers of Italy	FdI	Government	117 / 400 (29%)	66 / 200 (33%)
Ivory Coast	Democratic Party of Ivory Coast – African Democratic Rally	PDCI-RDA	Opposition	32 / 255 (13%)	6 / 99 (6%)
Kenya	Democratic Party of Kenya	DP	Government	1 / 349 (0.3%)	0 / 67 (0%)
Kenya	Kenya African National Union	KANU	Opposition	5 / 349 (1%)	0 / 67 (0%)
Latvia	National Alliance	NA	Opposition	13 / 100 (13%)	
Lebanon	Kataeb Party		Government	4 / 128 (3%)	
Lithuania	Lithuanian Christian Democrats	LKD	Opposition	28 / 141 (20%)	
Maldives	Maldivian Democratic Party	MDP	Opposition	12 / 93 (13%)	
Moldova	Party of Action and Solidarity	PAS	Government	62 / 101 (61%)	
Mongolia	Democratic Party	DP	Opposition	42 / 126 (33%)	
Morocco	Istiqlal Party		Government	81 / 395 (21%)	24 / 120 (20%)
Nepal	Rastriya Prajatantra Party	RPP	Opposition	5 / 275 (2%)	0 / 59 (0%)
New Zealand	National Party	NAT	Government	49 / 123 (40%)	
Nigeria	Peoples Democratic Party	PDP	Opposition	72 / 360 (20%)	26 / 109 (24%)
North Macedonia	VMRO-DPMNE		Government	58 / 120 (48%)	
Norway	Conservative Party	H	Opposition	24 / 169 (14%)	
Panama	Democratic Change	CD	Support	8 / 71 (11%)	
Paraguay	Partido Colorado	ANR-PC	Government	48 / 80 (60%)	23 / 45 (51%)
Peru	Christian People's Party	PPC	Extraparliamentary opposition	0 / 130 (0%)	
Portugal	CDS – People's Party	CDS–PP	Government	2 / 230 (0.9%)	
Romania	National Liberal Party	PNL	Government	49 / 330 (15%)	22 / 136 (16%)
Saint Lucia	United Workers Party	UWP	Opposition	2 / 17 (12%)	3 / 11 (27%)
Saint Vincent and the Grenadines	New Democratic Party	NDP	Government	14 / 15 (93%)	
Serbia	Serbian Progressive Party	SNS	Government	104 / 250 (42%)	
Slovenia	Slovenian Democratic Party	SDS	Government	27 / 90 (30%)	
South Korea	People Power Party	PPP	Opposition	107 / 300 (36%)	
Spain	People's Party	PP	Opposition	137 / 350 (39%)	143 / 264 (54%)
Sri Lanka	United National Party	UNP	Opposition	2 / 225 (0.9%)	
South Africa	Inkatha Freedom Party	IFP	Government	17 / 400 (4%)	
Sweden	Moderate Party	M	Government	68 / 349 (19%)	
Sweden	Christian Democrats	KD	Government	19 / 349 (5%)	
Taiwan	Kuomintang	KMT	Opposition	52 / 113 (46%)	
Tanzania	Party for Democracy and Progress	CHADEMA	Opposition	20 / 393 (5%)	
Uganda	Forum for Democratic Change	FDC	Opposition	32 / 529 (6%)	
Ukraine	European Solidarity		Opposition	27 / 450 (6%)	
Ukraine	All-Ukrainian Union "Fatherland"		Opposition	24 / 450 (5%)	
United Kingdom	Conservative and Unionist Party	CON	Opposition	118 / 650 (18%)	247 / 798 (31%)
United States	Republican Party	R / GOP	Government	220 / 435 (51%)	53 / 100 (53%)
Venezuela	Encuentro Ciudadano	EC	Opposition	0 / 277 (0%)	
Venezuela	Project Venezuela	PV	Opposition	2 / 277 (0.7%)	

== Former members ==
- Argentina – Justicialist Party
- Bosnia and Herzegovina – Party of Democratic Action
- Bosnia and Herzegovina – Croatian Democratic Union 1990
- Bolivia – Nationalist Democratic Action
- Brazil – Democrats
- Bulgaria – Union of Democratic Forces
- Canada – Progressive Conservative Party of Canada
- Dominican Republic – Social Christian Reformist Party
- France – Rally for the Republic
- France – Union for a Popular Movement
- Guatemala – National Advancement Party
- Honduras – National Party of Honduras
- Hungary – Fidesz
- India – Bharatiya Janata Party
- Japan – Liberal Democratic Party
- Lebanon – Lebanese Forces
- Lithuania – Homeland Union
- Moldova – Liberal Democratic Party of Moldova
- Montenegro – Movement for Changes
- Nicaragua – Conservative Party
- Portugal – Social Democratic Party
- Russia – Union of Right Forces
- Serbia – Democratic Party of Serbia
- Serbia – United Regions of Serbia
- South Africa – New National Party
- South Korea – Liberty Korea Party
- Spain – People's Alliance
- Spain – People's Democratic Party

== Chairmen ==
No.	Portrait	Name (Birth)	Term of office			Political party	Previous or concurrent position
No.	Portrait	Name (Birth)	Took office	Left office	Time in office	Political party	Previous or concurrent position
1		Alois Mock (1934–2017)	24 June 1983	1987	Approximately 4 years	Austrian People's Party	Vice-Chancellor of Austria (1987–1989)
2		Kåre Willoch (1928–2021)	1987	1989	Approximately 2 years	Conservative Party of Norway	Prime Minister of Norway (1981–1986)
3		Andrew Peacock (1939–2021)	September 1989	September 1992	Approximately 3 years	Liberal Party of Australia	Leader of the Opposition in Australia (1983–1985; 1989–1990)
4		Carl Bildt (born 1949)	1992	1999	Approximately 7 years	Moderate Party	Prime Minister of Sweden (1991–1994)
5		William Hague (born 1961)	1999	10 June 2002	Approximately 3 years	Conservative Party	Leader of the Opposition in the United Kingdom (1997–2001)
6		John Howard (born 1939)	10 June 2002	21 November 2014	12 years, 164 days	Liberal Party of Australia	Prime Minister of Australia (1996–2007)
7		John Key (born 1961)	21 November 2014	21 February 2018	3 years, 92 days	New Zealand National Party	Prime Minister of New Zealand (2008–2016)
8		Stephen Harper (born 1959)	21 February 2018	Incumbent	8 years, 259 days	Conservative Party of Canada	Prime Minister of Canada (2006–2015)

Since 1999, all chairmen have come from English-speaking countries: the United Kingdom, Australia, New Zealand and Canada.

== Regional unions ==
In addition to being members of the UDI, political parties can also be members of one of its regional unions:

- Unión de Partidos Latinoamericanos (UPLA): Union of Latin American Parties;
- Asia Pacific Democrat Union (APDU or UDAP): Democratic Union of Asia and the Pacific
- Caribbean Democrat Union (CDU or UDC): Caribbean Democratic Union
- Democrat Union of Africa (DUA or UDA): Democratic Union of Africa
- European Democrat Union (EDU or EDU): European Democratic Union

== Leadership ==
The leadership of the International Democracy Union (IDU) consists of a chairman, deputy chairman, honorary chairman, six executive vice-chairmen and 15 vice-chairmen, together with other officers and committee chairs. As of November 2026, the leadership is as follows:

- Chairman: Stephen Harper (Conservative Party of Canada), Prime Minister of Canada (2006–2015). Harper was first elected IDU chairman in February 2018 and was re-elected for a further three-year term in 2025.
- Deputy chairman: Brian Loughnane (Liberal Party of Australia), former federal director of the Liberal Party (2003–2015).
- Honorary chairman: Lord Ashcroft (Conservative Party, United Kingdom).
- Secretary general and executive director: Tina Mercep (Croatian Democratic Union, Croatia).

=== Executive vice-chairmen ===
- Tundu Lissu (Chadema, Tanzania), chairman of Chadema. Lissu was elected an IDU vice-chairman in May 2025.
- Antonio Giordano (Brothers of Italy, Italy).
- Scott Morrison (Liberal Party of Australia), Prime Minister of Australia (2018–2022).
- Priti Patel (Conservative Party, United Kingdom).
- Diego Schalper (National Renewal, Chile).
- David McAllister (Christian Democratic Union of Germany, Germany).

=== Vice-chairmen ===
- Marwan Abdallah (Kataeb Party, Lebanon).
- Louisa Atta-Agyemang (New Patriotic Party, Ghana), chairwoman of the Democrat Union of Africa.
- Haley Barbour (Republican Party, United States), Governor of Mississippi (2004–2012).
- Deborah Bergamini (Forza Italia, Italy).
- Tasos Chatzivasileiou (New Democracy, Greece).
- Allen Chastanet (United Workers Party, Saint Lucia), Prime Minister of Saint Lucia (2016–2021) and chairman of the Caribbean Democrat Union.
- Rahhal El Makkaoui (Istiqlal Party, Morocco).
- Carlo Fidanza (Brothers of Italy, Italy), vice-president of the European Conservatives and Reformists Party.
- Florian Hahn (Christian Social Union in Bavaria, Germany).
- Gabriel Mato (People's Party, Spain).
- Francisco Chahuán (National Renewal, Chile), chairman of the Union of Latin American Parties.
- Marco Solares (Unionist Party, Guatemala).
- Jens Spahn (Christian Democratic Union of Germany, Germany).
- Dubravka Šuica (Croatian Democratic Union, Croatia).
- Tsakhiagiin Elbegdorj (Democratic Party, Mongolia), President of Mongolia (2009–2017) and Prime Minister of Mongolia (1998; 2004–2006).

=== Other officers ===
- Chairman, Standing Committee on Foreign Affairs: Reinhold Lopatka (Austrian People's Party, Austria).
- Chairman, Standing Committee on Elections and Campaigning: Martin Borgs (Moderate Party, Sweden).
- Treasurer: Christopher J. Fussner (Republican Party, United States).
- Political auditor: Eva Gustavsson (Moderate Party, Sweden).

=== Affiliated organization leaders ===
- Chair, International Young Democrat Union: Eva Dohalova (Austrian People's Party, Austria).
- Chairwoman, International Women's Democrat Union: Sofia Brambilla (Republican Proposal, Argentina).
- President, SME Global: Jörgen Warborn (Moderate Party, Sweden).

== See also ==
- Asia Pacific Democracy Union
- Caribbean Democrat Union
- Centrist Democrat International
- Conservative Establishment
- Democracy Union of Africa
- European Conservatives and Reformists Group
- European Conservatives and Reformists Party
- European People's Party
- International Women's Democracy Union
- International Young Democrat Union
- Political internationals: such as the Liberal International and the Socialist International
- Union of Latin American Parties
