= Democrat Union of Africa =

Centre-right political international in Africa

Democracy Union of Africa
- Abbreviation: DUA
- Formation: 1997
- Founded at: Dakar, Senegal
- Location: Accra, Ghana
- Region served: Africa
- Honorable Patron: Nana Akufo-Addo
- Chairperson: Louisa Atta-Agyemang
- Affiliations: International Democracy Union

The Democracy Union of Africa is an alliance of centre-right political parties in Africa. Founded in Dakar, Senegal, in 1997, it is affiliated with the global International Democracy Union (IDU). Headquartered in Accra, Ghana, it aims to bring together parties with similar aims and political goals, such as the protection of democracy and individual liberty, from the whole of Africa.

== Diplomatic meetings ==
A meeting of the Democracy Union of Africa occurred with the support of the IDU on 3–5 February 2019 in Accra, Ghana. 17 parties from within the DUA were represented at this meeting.

The meeting was opened by the Secretary General of Ghana's New Patriotic Party, John Bouadu. President of the Popular Democratic Movement, McHenry Venaani, was elected DUA chairman at this meeting, and President of Ghana Nana Akufo-Addo took the role as Honorary Patron of the DUA. Vice-President of Ghana, Dr Mahamudu Bawumia, accepted the role on his behalf.

In an address to Ghanaian media at the meeting in Accra, IDU Secretary General Christian Kattner said that, ‘we need a strong Democracy Union of Africa offering a sustainable network for political parties on the African continent, fighting together for freedom and democracy in order to ensure a better life of all people of Africa.

== Interim Steering Committee ==
The current executive committee was elected in December 2024. The current leadership are as follows:

- Chairperson: Md Louisa Atta-Agyemang, Member of the New Patriotic Party in Ghana
- Secretary General: Mr Joy Reuben, Deputy Secretary General of the Inkatha Freedom Party in South Africa
- Deputy Chairman: Hon Rafael Savimbi Massanga, Member of the National Union for the Total Independence of Angola (UNITA)
- Treasurer: Md Leonor Elisa Lopes De Sousa, Member of the Democratic Movement of Mozambique in Mozambique
- Vice-Chair for North Africa: Mr. Rahhal El Makkaoui, Member of the Executive Committee in Charge of International Relations, Istiqlal Party, Morocco
- Vice-Chair for East Africa: Mr. Deogratias Munishi, International Relations Secretary, CHADEMA, Tanzania
- Vice Chair for West Africa: Sen. Samuel Anyanwu, General Secretary, Peoples Democratic Party, Nigeria
- Vice Chair for Southern Africa: Md. Linette Olofsson, Head of the Department of Foreign Affairs, Democratic Movement, Mozambique
- Vice Chair for Central Africa: Md. Avelino Mocache Mehenga, President of the Unión de Centro Derecha (UCD), Equatorial Guinea

== Member parties ==
=== Full Members ===
Country	Party	Abbr	Color	Upper house legislative seats	Lower house legislative seats	Status
Angola	National Union for the Total Independence of Angola	UNITA	Red and Green	Unicameral legislature only	90 / 220	In opposition
Côte d'Ivoire	Democratic Party of Côte d'Ivoire – African Democratic Rally	PDCI-RDA	Green	Unicameral legislature only	63 / 255	In opposition
Equatorial Guinea	Union of the Centre-Right	UCD	Blue	0 / 70	0 / 100	Extra-parliamentary opposition
Ghana	New Patriotic Party	NPP	Red, Blue, and White	Unicameral legislature only	88 / 276	In opposition
Kenya	Democratic Party	DP	Green, Orange	0 / 67	0 / 349	Extra-parliamentary opposition
Kenya	Kenya Africa National Union	KANU	Black, Red and Green	3 / 67	10 / 349	In opposition
Lesotho	Basotho National Party	BNP	Blue, White, Red, and Green	Senate members are tribal leaders or appointees	1 / 120	In opposition
Liberia	Unity Party	UP	Green and Maroon	13 / 30	10 / 73	In government
Malawi	Malawi Congress Party	MCP	Black, Red, and Green	Unicameral legislature only	55 / 193	In government
Malawi	People's Party	PP	Orange, Black & White	Unicameral legislature only	5 / 193	In opposition
Morocco	Istiqlal Party	Istiqlal	Mauve, Pink	17 / 120	81 / 395	In government
Mozambique	Mozambican National Resistance	RENAMO	Black, Red, Blue, White	Unicameral legislature only	60 / 250	In opposition
Namibia	Popular Democratic Movement	PDM	Blue, White and Red	2 / 42	16 / 104	In opposition
Nigeria	People's Democratic Party	PDP	Green, White and Red	36 / 109	118 / 360	In opposition
Seychelles	New Democratic Party	NDP	Blue	Unicameral legislature only	0 / 31	Extra-parliamentary opposition
Sierra Leone	Sierra Leone People's Party	SLPP	Green	Unicameral legislature only	81 / 149	In government
South Africa	African Christian Democratic Party	ACDP	Red and Blue	1 / 430	3 / 400	In opposition
South Africa	Inkatha Freedom Party	IFP	Red, White, Black, Green, and Yellow	2 / 90	17 / 400	In government
Tanzania	Party for Democracy and Progress	CHADEMA	Red, Blue, and White	Unicameral legislature only	0 / 393	In opposition
Uganda	Democratic Party	DP	Green	Unicameral legislature only	9 / 529	In opposition
Uganda	Forum for Democratic Change	FDC	Blue	Unicameral legislature only	32 / 529	In opposition

=== Observer members ===
Country	Party	Abbr	Color	Upper house legislative seats	Lower house legislative seats	Status
Sierra Leone	People's Movement for Democratic Change	PMDC	Green, Orange	Unicameral legislature only	0 / 149	Extra-parliamentary opposition
