= List of members of the European Parliament for the United Kingdom (1979–1984) =

This is a list of the 81 members of the European Parliament for the United Kingdom in the 1979 to 1984 session.

Name	National party	EP Group	Constituency	Born	Died
Gordon Adam	Labour Party	SOC	Northumbria	1934	
Richard Balfe	Labour Party	SOC	London South Inner	1944	
Neil Balfour	Conservative Party	ED	Yorkshire North	1944	
Robert Battersby	Conservative Party	ED	Humberside	1924	2002
Peter Beazley	Conservative Party	ED	Bedfordshire South	1922	2004
Lord Bethell	Conservative Party	ED	London North West	1938	2007
Roland Boyes	Labour Party	SOC	Durham	1937	2006
Beata Brookes	Conservative Party	ED	Wales North	1930	2015
Janey Buchan	Labour Party	SOC	Glasgow	1926	2012
Richard Caborn	Labour Party	SOC	Sheffield	1943	
Barbara Castle	Labour Party	SOC	Greater Manchester North	1910	2002
Frederick Catherwood	Conservative Party	ED	Cambridgeshire	1925	2014
Ann Clwyd	Labour Party	SOC	Wales Mid & West	1937	2023
Ken Collins	Labour Party	SOC	Strathclyde East	1939	
Richard Cottrell	Conservative Party	ED	Bristol	1943	2024
David Curry	Conservative Party	ED	Essex North East	1944	
Ian Dalziel	Conservative Party	ED	Lothians	1947	
John de Courcy Ling	Conservative Party	ED	Midlands Central	1933	2005
Basil de Ferranti	Conservative Party	ED	Hampshire West	1930	1988
Marquess of Douro	Conservative Party	ED	Surrey	1945	
Baroness Elles	Conservative Party	ED	Thames Valley	1921	2009
Derek Enright	Labour Party	SOC	Leeds	1935	1995
Winifred Ewing	Scottish National Party	EPD	Highlands and Islands	1929	2023
Adam Fergusson	Conservative Party	ED	Strathclyde West	1932	
Norvela Forster	Conservative Party	ED	Birmingham South	1931	1993
Eric Forth	Conservative Party	ED	Birmingham North	1944	2006
Michael Gallagher	Labour Party / SDP (Jan 1984)	SOC	Nottingham	1934	2015
Win Griffiths	Labour Party	SOC	Wales South	1943	
Lord Harmar-Nicholls	Conservative Party	ED	Greater Manchester South	1912	2000
David Harris	Conservative Party	ED	Cornwall & Plymouth	1937	
Gloria Hooper	Conservative Party	ED	Liverpool	1939	
William Hopper	Conservative Party	ED	Greater Manchester West	1929	
Brian Hord	Conservative Party	ED	London West	1934	2015
Paul Howell	Conservative Party	ED	Norfolk	1951	2008
John Hume	Social Democratic and Labour Party	SOC	Northern Ireland	1937	2020
Alasdair Hutton	Conservative Party	ED	South of Scotland	1940	
Christopher Jackson	Conservative Party	ED	Kent East	1935	2019
Robert V. Jackson	Conservative Party	ED	Upper Thames	1946	
Stanley Johnson	Conservative Party	ED	Wight & Hampshire East	1940	
Edward Kellett-Bowman	Conservative Party	ED	Lancashire East	1931	2022
Elaine Kellett-Bowman	Conservative Party	ED	Cumbria	1923	2014
Brian Key	Labour Party	SOC	Yorkshire South	1947	2016
Alfred Lomas	Labour Party	SOC	London North East	1928	2021
John Marshall	Conservative Party	ED	London North	1940	2025
Thomas Megahy	Labour Party	SOC	Yorkshire South West	1929	2008
James Moorhouse	Conservative Party	ED	London South	1924	2014
Robert Moreland	Conservative Party	ED	Staffordshire East	1941	
Bill Newton Dunn	Conservative Party	ED	Lincolnshire	1941	
Sir David Nicolson	Conservative Party	ED	London Central	1922	1996
Tom Normanton	Conservative Party	ED	Cheshire East	1917	1997
Lord O'Hagan	Conservative Party	ED	Devon	1945	2025
Ian Paisley	Democratic Unionist Party	NI	Northern Ireland	1926	2014
Ben Patterson	Conservative Party	ED	Kent West	1939	
Andrew Pearce	Conservative Party	ED	Cheshire West	1937	
Henry Plumb	Conservative Party	ED	Cotswolds	1925	2022
Derek Prag	Conservative Party	ED	Hertfordshire	1923	2010
Peter Price	Conservative Party	ED	Lancashire West	1942	
Christopher Prout	Conservative Party	ED	Salop and Stafford	1942	2009
James Provan	Conservative Party	ED	North East Scotland	1936	
John Purvis	Conservative Party	ED	Mid Scotland and Fife	1938	2022
Joyce Quin	Labour Party	SOC	Tyne South and Wear	1944	
Brandon Rhys-Williams	Conservative Party	ED	London South East	1927	1988
Shelagh Roberts	Conservative Party	ED	London South West	1924	1992
Allan Rogers	Labour Party	SOC	Wales South East	1932	2023
James Scott-Hopkins	Conservative Party	ED	Hereford & Worcester	1921	1995
Barry Seal	Labour Party	SOC	Yorkshire West	1937	2025
Madron Seligman	Conservative Party	ED	Sussex West	1918	2002
Dr. Alexander Sherlock	Conservative Party	ED	Essex South West	1922	1999
Richard Simmonds	Conservative Party	ED	Midlands West	1944	
Anthony Simpson	Conservative Party	ED	Northamptonshire	1935	2022
Tom Spencer	Conservative Party	ED	Derbyshire	1948	2023
James Spicer	Conservative Party	ED	Wessex	1925	2015
Jack Stewart-Clark	Conservative Party	ED	Sussex East	1929	2026
John Taylor	Ulster Unionist Party	ED	Northern Ireland	1937	
John Taylor	Conservative Party	ED	Midlands East	1941	2017
Frederick Tuckman	Conservative Party	ED	Leicester	1922	2017
Amédée Turner	Conservative Party	ED	Suffolk	1929	2021
Alan Tyrrell	Conservative Party	ED	London East	1933	2014
Peter Vanneck	Conservative Party	ED	Cleveland	1922	1999
Frederick Warner	Conservative Party	ED	Somerset	1918	1995
Michael Welsh	Conservative Party	ED	Lancashire Central	1942	

== By-election ==
=== 1979 ===
- 20 September: London, South West—The Home Secretary announced on 11 July 1979 that Shelagh Roberts was disqualified from election due to her membership of the Occupational Pensions Board, which was an 'office of profit under the Crown'. She resigned from the board and was re-elected at the by-election.

== Change of allegiance ==
- Michael Gallagher, elected as a Labour MEP, announced on 5 January 1984 that he had joined the Social Democratic Party.
