= Sue Nicholls =

English actress (born 1943)

The Honourable Sue Nicholls
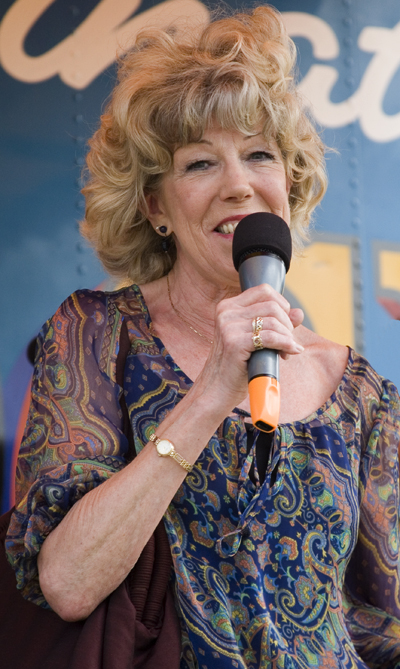
- Nicholls in 2010
- Born: Susan Frances Harmar Nicholls; 23 November 1943 (age 82); Darlaston, Staffordshire, England
- Education: Royal Academy of Dramatic Art
- Occupation: Actress
- Years active: 1963–2025
- Known for: Role of Audrey Roberts (Coronation Street)
- Television: Crossroads (1964-1968); The Fall and Rise of Reginald Perrin (1976–1979); Coronation Street (1979–1982, 1984–2025); Rentaghost (1981–1984)
- Spouse: Mark Eden (m. 1993; died 2021)
- Father: Harmar Nicholls

Susan Frances Harmar Nicholls (born 23 November 1943) is an English actress. She is best known for her long-running role as Audrey Roberts in the soap opera Coronation Street (1979–1982, 1984–2025). Her other roles on British television include Crossroads (1964–1968), The Fall and Rise of Reginald Perrin (1976–1979), and Rentaghost (1981–1984). She also appeared on Broadway in the 1974 revival of London Assurance.

Nicholls made her first appearance on Coronation Street in 1979 and appeared intermittently for six years, before joining the cast permanently in 1985. For her portrayal of Roberts, she won the 2000 British Soap Award for Best Comedy Performance and the 2003 British Soap Award for Best Dramatic Performance, as well as receiving an Outstanding Achievement Award in 2019.

== Early life and education ==
Susan Frances Harmar Nicholls was born in Darlaston, Staffordshire. Her father was Harmar Nicholls, later Lord Harmar-Nicholls, the Conservative MP for Peterborough (1950–1974) and MEP for Greater Manchester South (1979–1984). As the daughter of a life peer; she is entitled to be styled as "The Honourable Susan Nicholls". She has a sister, Judith. She was educated at the School of St Mary and St Anne (later known as Abbots Bromley School for Girls) and is a graduate of the Royal Academy of Dramatic Art.

== Career ==
Nicholls first became known as Marilyn Gates on Crossroads, a role she played from 1964 to 1968. A song she first sang on the programme, "Where Will You Be?", charted on 3 July 1968, eventually reaching number 17 in the UK singles chart.

Nicholls's second single was less successful and she embarked on a career in a cabaret, performing her solo act across the country. She returned to the stage in a variety of popular plays and pantomimes. During the 1970s, she had two very different stints abroad. In Vienna, she sang between strip acts at a nightclub while in 1974 she toured America and Canada with the Royal Shakespeare Company in London Assurance, finishing with a six-week run on Broadway.

She played the role of the secretary, Joan Greengross (later Webster and Millbeck) in the sitcom The Fall and Rise of Reginald Perrin (1976–1979) and its sequel The Legacy of Reginald Perrin (1996), as well as Nadia Popov in Rentaghost and Mrs Muddle in Pipkins (1973) and appeared as Derinda Forbes in the hard-hitting police drama The Professionals; episode "The Acorn Syndrome" (1980).

She played Audrey Roberts in Coronation Street from 1979 until 2025.

== Personal life ==
Nicholls was married to Mark Eden from 1993 until his death in 2021; Eden appeared as Alan Bradley on Coronation Street from 1986 until 1989.

In 2011, while watching an episode of Coronation Street, Sister Anna Bianconi-Moore, a senior nurse at the dermatology department at Addenbrooke's Hospital in Cambridge, noticed a mole on Nicholls' shoulder. The nurse contacted the show immediately via email to express her concerns. Nicholls was seen by Zeena Islam – Coronation Street's in-house doctor, who referred her to a skin cancer specialist, where she was diagnosed with melanoma. After the mole was surgically removed, ITV contacted Bianconi-Moore to inform her of the situation and she was invited to the Coronation Street set to meet Nicholls.

== Awards and nominations ==
Year	Award	Category	Result	Ref.
2000	British Soap Awards	Best Comedy Performance	Won	
2002	British Soap Awards	Hero of the Year	Nominated	
2002	TV Quick Awards	Best Soap Actress	Nominated	
2003	British Soap Awards	Best Actress	Nominated	
2003	British Soap Awards	Best Dramatic Performance	Won	
2003	British Soap Awards	Hero of the Year	Won	
2004	Inside Soap Awards	Outstanding Achievement	Won	
2019	British Soap Awards	Outstanding Achievement	Won	
2019	I Talk Telly Awards	Special Recognition	Won	
