= Birmingham South =

Birmingham South refers to two electoral divisions for the city of Birmingham, UK:

- Birmingham South (UK Parliament constituency) (1885–1918)
- Birmingham South (European Parliament constituency) (1979–1984)
