= Megahy =

Megahy is a surname of Irish Gaelic beginnings, It began as Mac (son of) Eachaidh (son of God or sword), the Megahy coat of arms bears the motto; “Non providentia sed victoria”

Motto Translation: ” No victory without foresight”

Notable people with the surname include:

- Francis Megahy (1935–2020), British film director
- Thomas Megahy (1929–2008), British teacher and politician
- Ian Cameron Megahy (1958-present)

Canadian Police Officer TPS 1977-2014
