= William Hopper (politician) =

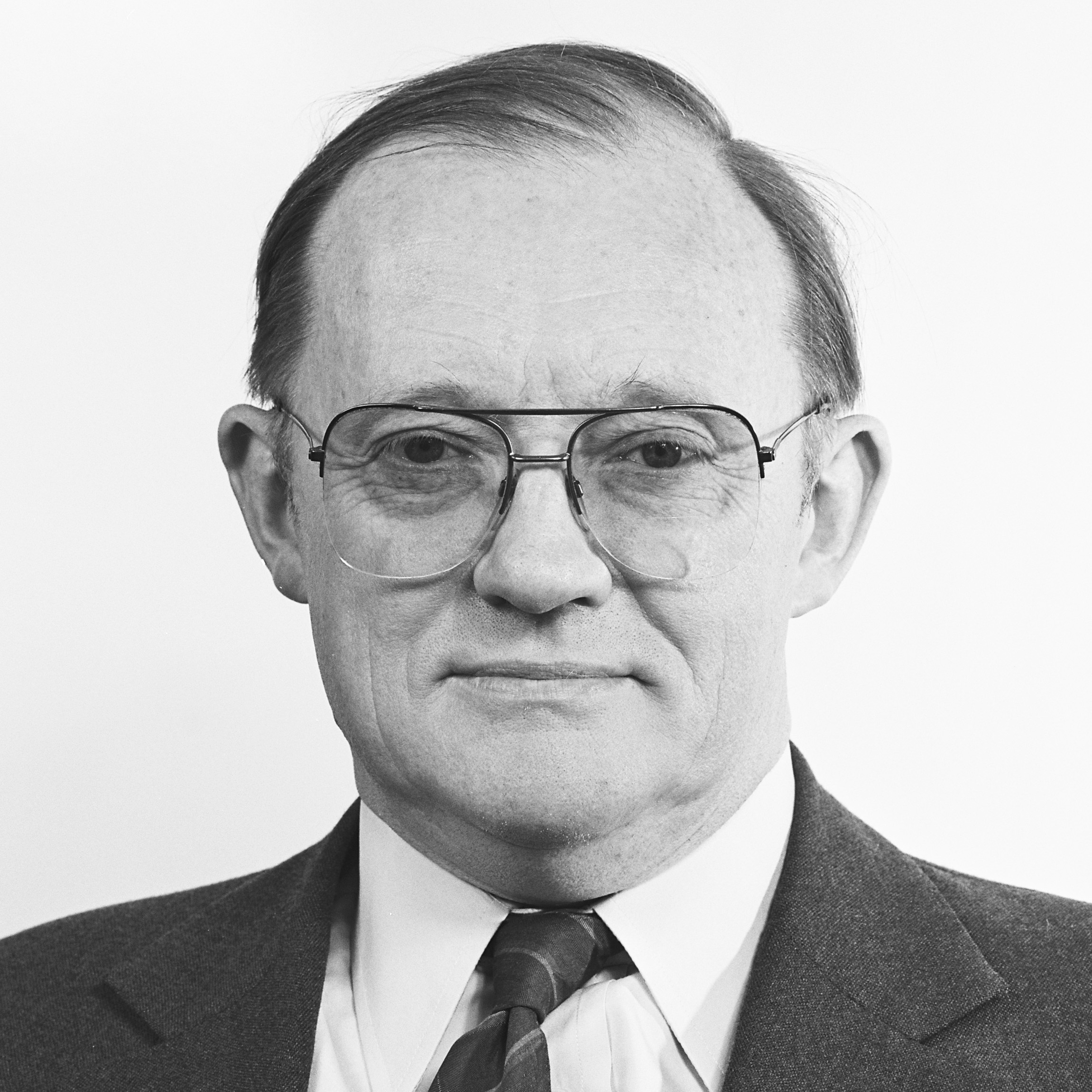
European Parliament portrait

William Joseph Hopper, sometimes known as Will Hopper (born 9 August 1929), is a British investment banker who also became involved in the political field. He was one of the founders of the Institute for Fiscal Studies, a non-partisan research institute which offers comment on the economic impact of political proposals. Hopper enjoyed a brief political career as a Member of the European Parliament (MEP) for the Conservative Party.

== Education ==
Hopper was brought up in Glasgow where he attended Langside Elementary School followed by Queen's Park Secondary School. He went to the University of Glasgow to read modern languages, and graduated with a 1st Class Master of Arts degree in 1953. He served in the Royal Air Force with the rank of Pilot Officer in the education branch from 1953 to 1955.

== Business career ==
In 1956 Hopper joined W. R. Grace and Company in New York City to work as a financial analyst. After three years, he returned to Britain to be London office manager of H Hentz & Co, who were members of the New York Stock Exchange. After six years he became general manager of S. G. Warburg & Co Ltd, and three years after that he was made a Director of Hill Samuel.

== Institute for Fiscal Studies ==
Hopper had discussed with three friends, all of whom were professional finance employees, the way in which Capital Gains Tax had been introduced in 1965, which all concerned thought had been disastrous. Over dinner in July 1968 the friends decided that what was needed was a non-partisan Institute which would research such proposals and report on them to the political world and the wider public; the Institute for Fiscal Studies was formally launched on 21 May 1969 with Hopper as founder chairman. The Institute also had undeclared objectives of improving procedures for changing taxation, and making taxation more rational. While at Hill Samuel, he became involved in examining the possibility of the Common Market developing a Common Capital Market which might include the United Kingdom; he knew this would transform the operation of the London capital markets. In 1975, Hopper left Hill Samuel to become a director of Morgan Grenfell. He was awarded the 'Deal of the Year' by Institutional Investor magazine in 1976 for his handling of a bond issue for the European Investment Bank.

== European Parliament ==
Hopper became increasingly involved in politics in the late 1970s. In August 1977 he wrote to The Times to criticise Chancellor of the Exchequer Denis Healey for threatening retaliation against companies who broke Government incomes policy; Hopper considered that doing so was arbitrary and amounted to an abandonment of the rule of law. He asked rhetorically whether "liberal democracy [is] dead in the land of its birth?" For the 1979 European Parliament election, Hopper was chosen as the Conservative Party candidate for Greater Manchester West, a constituency which included Bolton, Salford and Altrincham. The constituency had had a Labour majority at the 1979 general election but Hopper succeeded in scoring a surprise victory by 302 votes, which made it the narrowest win in the country.

== Monetary union ==
Hopper specialised in economic policy at the European Parliament. In November 1980 he made a speech on behalf of the European Democratic Group in which he urged that member states not adopt economic policies which were in competition with each other. He said that the European Monetary System needed central supervision but should not concentrate on keeping currency exchange rates within narrow bands and instead make it difficult for member states to export unemployment to each other. The next month he criticised the government of Japan for managing its exchange rates to promote exports, particularly of cars, which meant that there had never been fair competition.

== 1981 budget ==
When 364 economists wrote to denounce the Conservative government's 1981 budget, Hopper defended the government by arguing that the group "had 364 different opinions" on an alternative policy, and that their call would lead to "fiscal stimulation which will end in renewed inflation and yet higher unemployment". Later that year he criticised Edward Heath for advocating a "ringfence" of exchange controls across the European Community, which Hopper described as "beguiling nonsense".

At the 1984 European Parliament election, Hopper's constituency underwent unwelcome boundary changes which removed Altrincham and added Bury. In addition, he was opposed by Barbara Castle, the sitting Labour member for Greater Manchester North who was a very well known figure. Hopper was defeated for re-election by 37,698 votes.

== Later career ==
Hopper had remained at Morgan Grenfell as an adviser while serving in the European Parliament, and he swiftly became a Director of Wharf Resources Ltd., a firm based in Calgary in Canada. His constituency connections in Manchester paid off when he was made a Director of the Manchester Ship Canal Company from 1985 to 1987. He was executive chairman of Shire Trust Ltd from 1986 to 1991 and chairman of Robust Mouldings Ltd from 1986 to 1990; Hopper also served as an adviser to Yamaichi International (Europe) from 1986 to 1988. In 1996 he set up W J Hopper & Co Ltd, an investment banking company.

Outside of business Hopper was involved in voluntary sector activities. He was a trustee of the National Hospital for Nervous Diseases Development Trust from 1986 to 1990. He is a Unitarian and was a member of the Committee of Management of Rosslyn Hill Unitarian Chapel from 1995 to 2000, returning in 2004 (he served as chairman in 1995 to 1998). He was also a member of the London District and South Eastern Provincial Assembly of Unitarian and Free Christian Churches from 2000 to 2004.

== Personal Awards ==
'Deal of the Year' by Institutional Investor magazine in 1976 for his handling of a bond issue for the European Investment Bank.

Lifetime Achievement Award in Private Equity from the Thunderbird School of Global Management.

== Puritan Gift ==
In 2006, he wrote with his brother, Kenneth Hopper, a study of the Protestant work ethic in the United States, called The Puritan Gift: Triumph, Collapse and Revival of an American Dream. A second hardback edition was published in 2008. In 2009 a paperback edition was published with the new subtitle: Reclaiming the American Dream amidst Global Financial Chaos. While writing a sequel, Hopper was targeted by fraudsters posing as bank staff and lost £1,000; he persuaded the fraudsters to give him £300 back for spending money, and eventually recouped his loss from his own bank, thereby making a profit.
