= Christopher Jackson (politician) =

British politician (1935–2019)

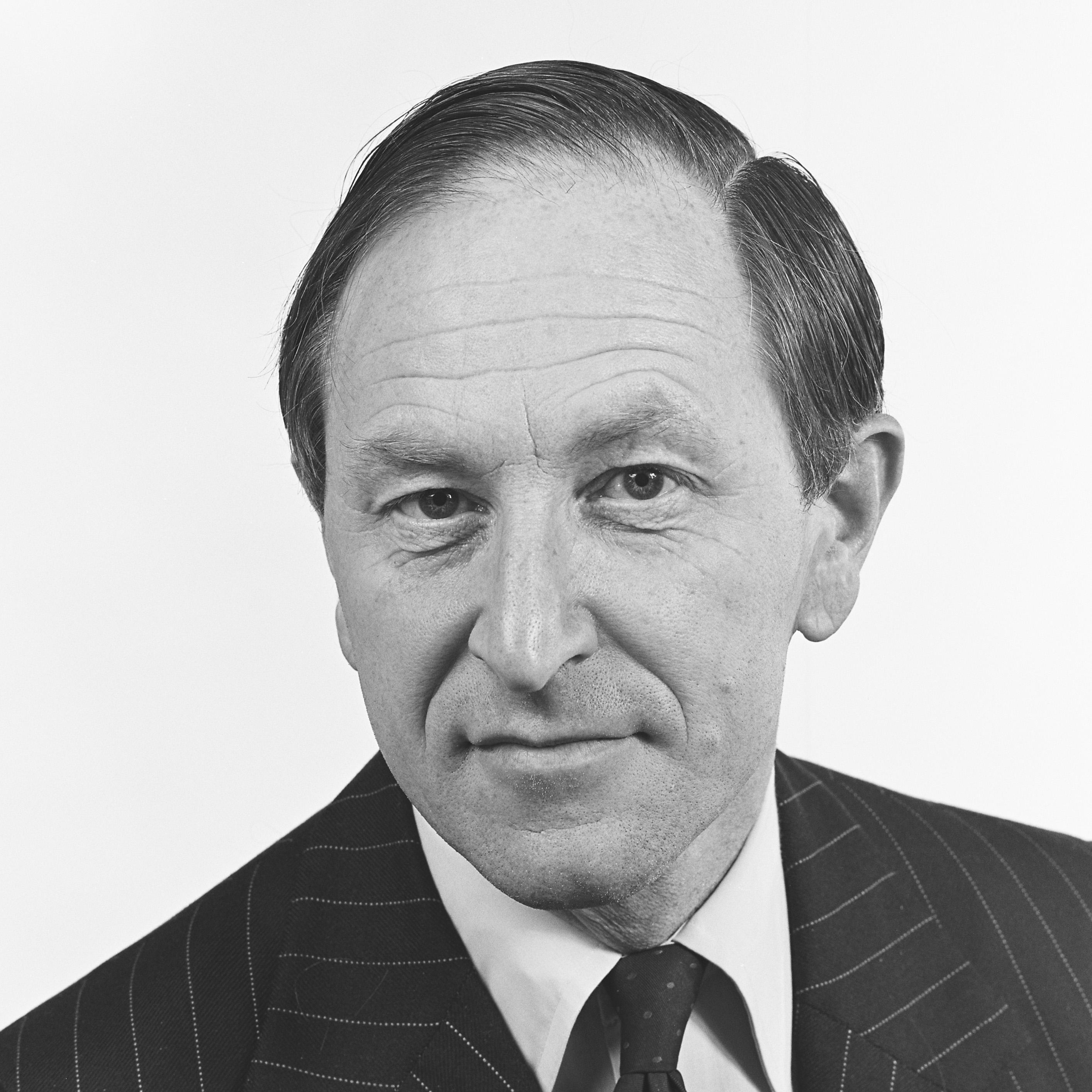
European Parliament portrait

Christopher Murray Jackson (24 May 1935 – 13 December 2019) was a British businessman and Conservative Party politician who served as a Member of the European Parliament (MEP) from 1979 to 1994.

After a National Service Commission in the RAF as a pilot, Jackson read physics at Magdalen College, Oxford, of which he was an Open Exhibitioner. Whilst there he founded the Magnates Club which eventually became the Oxford University Guild Society. He then trained in management with Unilever, becoming a senior manager of the Group in 1967.

Jackson contested East Ham South as a Conservative in the 1970 General Election and Northampton North in 1974.

He was Director of Corporate Development of the Spillers Group from 1974 to 1979.

Jackson was elected as the Member of the European Parliament for Kent East from 1979 (the first European Parliament Elections) to 1994, he served as Conservative Spokesman on Development Policy; Agriculture; Economic Affairs and Foreign Affairs. In 1984 he proposed the inclusion of subsidiarity in the Draft Treaty on European Union and led a European Parliament delegation, including Altiero Spinelli to the UK for discussions on the Draft Treaty with the Conservative, Labour, and Liberal parties, the CBI and the TUC. He was a Member of the ACP-European Economic Community Joint Assembly of which he was Rapporteur-General in 1985. He became Deputy Leader of Conservative MEPs in 1989, remaining in that position until 1991, and Co-President of the EP Working Group on Population and Development. From 1995 to 2002 he was Chairman of CJA Consultants Ltd and from 1997 to 2003 Chairman of Natural Resources International Ltd. He left the Conservative Party in 1999 and rejoined in 2007.

He was a member of the Royal Institute of International Affairs (Chatham House) and of the Athenaeum Club.

Jackson was also the Chairman of Governors of Bethany School, Goudhurst from 1999. He died on 13 December 2019, at the age of 84.
