= Greater Manchester West (European Parliament constituency) =

Former European Parliament constituency

- European Parliament constituency
- Boundary within North West England (1979-1984)
- Member state: United Kingdom
- Created: 1979
- Dissolved: 1999
- MEPs: 1

Prior to its uniform adoption of proportional representation in 1999, the United Kingdom used first-past-the-post for the European elections in England, Scotland and Wales. The European Parliament constituencies used under that system were smaller than the later regional constituencies and only had one Member of the European Parliament each.

The constituency of Greater Manchester West was one of them.

From 1979 to 1984, it consisted of the Westminster Parliament constituencies of Altrincham and Sale, Bolton East, Bolton West, Eccles, Farnworth, Leigh, Salford East, Salford West, and Stretford. From 1984 to 1994 it consisted of Bolton North East, Bolton South East, Bolton West, Bury North, Bury South, Eccles, Salford East, and Worsley. From 1994 to 1999 it consisted of Bolton North East, Bolton South East, Bolton West, Bury South, Davyhulme, Eccles, Salford East, and Worsley.

Boundary within North West England (1984-1994)

Boundary within North West England (1994-1999)

== MEPs ==
Elected	Member	Party
1979	William Hopper	Conservative
1984	Barbara Castle	Labour
1989	Gary Titley	Labour
1999	Constituency abolished: see North West England	

== Election results ==
European Parliament election, 1979: Greater Manchester West
Party	Candidate	Votes	%	±%
Conservative	William Hopper	67,127	43.3	
Labour	P. Nurse	66,825	43.1	
Liberal	E. A. O. G. Wedell	21,021	13.6	
Majority		302	0.2	
Turnout		154,973	29.4	
Conservative win (new seat)				

European Parliament election, 1984: Greater Manchester West
Party	Candidate	Votes	%	±%
Labour	Barbara Castle	93,740	55.9	+12.8
Conservative	William Hopper	56,042	33.4	−9.9
SDP	John R. Boddy	17,894	10.7	−2.9
Majority		37,698	22.5	N/A
Turnout		167,676	31.7	
Labour gain from Conservative		Swing		

European Parliament election, 1989: Greater Manchester West
Party	Candidate	Votes	%	±%
Labour	Gary Titley	109,228	54.7	−1.2
Conservative	Paul H. Twyman	56,093	28.1	−5.3
Green	David W. Milne	22,778	11.4	New
SLD	Adrian H. Cruden	6,940	3.5	−7.2
SDP	Mrs. Beryl Archer	4,526	2.3	New
Majority		53,135	26.6	+4.1
Turnout		199,565	38.2	+6.5
Labour hold		Swing		

European Parliament election, 1994: Greater Manchester West
Party	Candidate	Votes	%	±%
Labour	Gary Titley	94,129	61.8	+7.1
Conservative	David E. Newns	35,494	23.3	−4.8
Liberal Democrats	Frank Harasiwka	13,650	9.0	+5.5
Green	Ray Jackson	3,950	2.6	−8.8'"`UNIQ−−ref−0000001E−QINU`"'
Independent	George Harrison	3,693	2.4	New
Natural Law	Terry L. Brotheridge	1,360	0.9	New
Majority		58,635	38.5	+11.9
Turnout		152,276	29.7	−8.5
Labour hold		Swing		
