= Barbara Castle =

British politician (1910–2002)

The Right Honourable The Baroness Castle of Blackburn PC
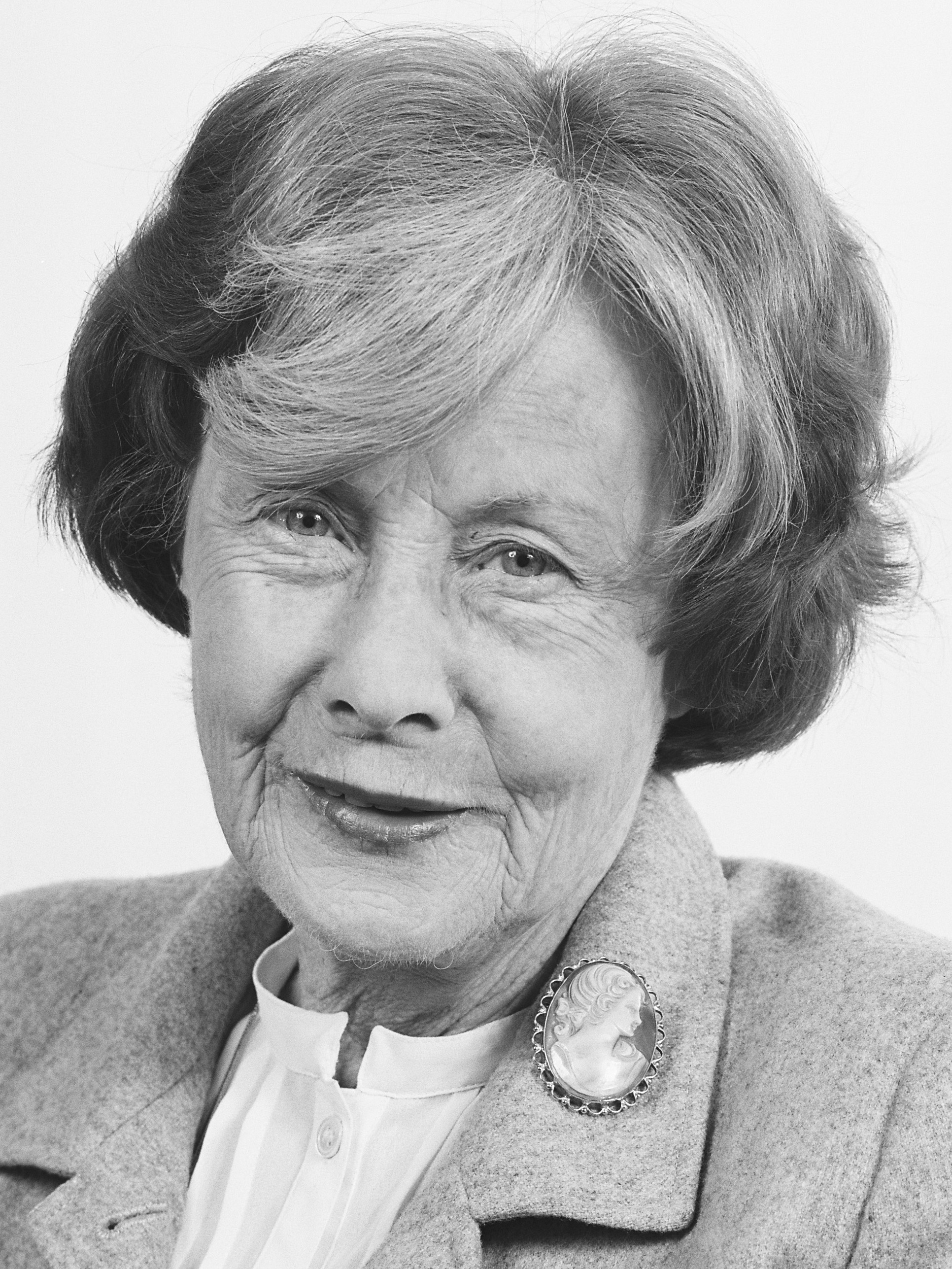
- Castle, c. 1979-1989

Secretary of State for Social Services
- In office 5 March 1974 – 8 April 1976
- Prime Minister: Harold Wilson
- Preceded by: Keith Joseph
- Succeeded by: David Ennals

First Secretary of State
- In office 6 April 1968 – 19 June 1970
- Prime Minister: Harold Wilson
- Preceded by: Michael Stewart
- Succeeded by: Michael Heseltine (Note: Office vacant from 19 June 1970 to 5 July 1995.)

Secretary of State for Employment and Productivity
- In office 6 April 1968 – 19 June 1970
- Prime Minister: Harold Wilson
- Preceded by: Ray Gunter
- Succeeded by: Robert Carr

Minister for Transport
- In office 23 December 1965 – 6 April 1968
- Prime Minister: Harold Wilson
- Preceded by: Tom Fraser
- Succeeded by: Richard Marsh

Minister for Overseas Development
- In office 18 October 1964 – 23 December 1965
- Prime Minister: Harold Wilson
- Preceded by: Office Created
- Succeeded by: Anthony Greenwood

Member of the House of Lords
- Lord Temporal
- Life peerage 16 July 1990 – 3 May 2002

Member of the European Parliament for Greater Manchester West Greater Manchester North (1979–1984)
- In office 17 July 1979 – 21 July 1989
- Preceded by: Constituency established
- Succeeded by: Gary Titley

Member of Parliament for Blackburn Blackburn East (1950–1955)
- In office 5 July 1945 – 7 April 1979
- Preceded by: George Sampson Elliston
- Succeeded by: Jack Straw

Personal details
- Born: Barbara Anne Betts; 6 October 1910 Chesterfield, Derbyshire, England
- Died: 3 May 2002 (aged 91) Ibstone, Buckinghamshire, England
- Party: Labour
- Spouse: Edward Castle, Baron Castle (m. 1944; died 1979)
- Education: St Hugh's College, Oxford

Barbara Anne Castle, Baroness Castle of Blackburn (née Betts; 6 October 1910 – 3 May 2002) was a British Labour Party politician who was a Member of Parliament from 1945 to 1979, making her one of the longest-serving female MPs in British history. Regarded as one of the most significant Labour Party politicians, Castle developed a close political partnership with Prime Minister Harold Wilson and held several roles in the Cabinet. She was the first woman to have held the office of First Secretary of State.

A graduate of the University of Oxford, Castle worked as a journalist for both Tribune and the Daily Mirror, before being elected to Parliament as MP for Blackburn at the 1945 election. During the Attlee government, she was Parliamentary Private Secretary to Stafford Cripps, and later to Harold Wilson, marking the beginning of their partnership. She was a strong supporter of Wilson during his campaign to become Leader of the Labour Party, and following his victory at the 1964 election, Wilson appointed Castle to the Cabinet as Minister for Overseas Development, and later as Minister of Transport. In the latter role, she proved an effective reformer, overseeing the introduction of permanent speed limits for the first time on British roads, as well as legislating for breathalyser tests and compulsory seat belts.

In 1968, Wilson promoted Castle to become First Secretary of State, the second-most senior member of the Cabinet, as well as Secretary of State for Employment. In the latter role, Castle fiercely advocated the passage of the In Place of Strife legislation which would have greatly overhauled the operating framework for British trade unions. The proposal split the Cabinet, and was eventually withdrawn. Castle was also notable for her successful intervention over the strike by Ford sewing machinists against gender pay discrimination, speaking out in support of the strikers, and overseeing the passage of the Equal Pay Act. After Labour unexpectedly lost the 1970 election, some blamed Castle's role in the debate over trade unions for the defeat, a charge she resisted.

Upon Labour's return to power after the 1974 election, Wilson appointed Castle Secretary of State for Social Services, during which time she was responsible for the creation of Carer's Allowance and the passage of the Child Benefit Act. She was also a prominent opponent of Britain's continued membership of the European Economic Community during the 1975 referendum. When Castle's bitter political rival, James Callaghan, replaced Wilson as prime minister in 1976, he sacked her immediately from the Cabinet; the two would remain bitter towards each other for the rest of their lives. Opting to retire from Parliament at the 1979 election, Castle quickly sought election to the European Parliament, representing Greater Manchester from 1979 to 1989; during this time, she was the Leader of the European Parliamentary Labour Party from 1979 to 1985, and publicly reversed her previous stance of Euroscepticism. She became a member of the House of Lords, having been granted a life peerage, in 1990, and remained active in politics until her death in 2002 at the age of 91.

== Early life ==
Barbara Anne Betts was born on 6 October 1910 at 64 Derby Road, Chesterfield, the youngest of three children to Frank Betts and his wife Annie Rebecca (née Ferrand). Raised in Pontefract, Bradford, and Hyde, Castle grew up in a politically active home and was introduced to socialism from a young age. Her older sister, Marjorie, later became a pioneer of the Inner London Education Authority, while their brother Tristram (almost always called Jimmie) engaged in field work with Oxfam in Nigeria. She joined the Labour Party as a teenager.

Her father was a tax inspector, exempt from military service in the First World War due to his high rank in a reserved occupation. It was because of the nature of the tax-collecting profession, and the promotions he received, that the family frequently moved around the country. Having moved to Bradford in 1922, the Betts family swiftly became involved with the Independent Labour Party. Although her father was prohibited from formal political activity because of his role as a civil servant, he became editor of the Bradford Pioneer, the city's socialist newspaper, after William Leach was elected to Parliament in 1935. Castle's mother ran the family home while also operating a soup kitchen for the town's coalminers. After Barbara had left home Annie was elected as a Labour councillor in Bradford.

== Education ==
Castle attended Love Lane Elementary School, then Pontefract and District Girls High School. After moving to Bradford at the age of twelve, she attended Bradford Girls' Grammar School. She became involved in acting at the school and developed oratorical skills. She excelled academically, winning numerous awards from the school. She also organised mock elections at the school, in which she stood as the Labour candidate. There were some aspects of the school that she did not like, notably the presence of many girls from rich families. In her last year she was appointed head girl.

Her education continued at St Hugh's College, Oxford, from which she graduated with a third-class BA in Philosophy, politics and economics in 1932. She began serious political activity at Oxford, serving as the Treasurer of the Oxford University Labour Club, the highest position a woman could hold in the club at the time. She struggled to accept the atmosphere of a university that had only recently begun to question its traditionally sexist attitudes. She was scornful of the elitist nature of some elements of the institution, branding the Oxford Union "that cadet class of the establishment".

== Early career ==
Castle was elected to St Pancras Metropolitan Borough Council in 1937 (where she remained until 1945), and in 1943 she spoke at the annual Labour Party Conference for the first time. Throughout the Second World War she worked as a senior administrative officer at the Ministry of Food and she was an Air Raid Precautions (ARP) warden during the Blitz.

She became a reporter on the left-wing magazine Tribune, where she had a romantic relationship with William Mellor, who was to become its editor, until his death in 1942. Following her marriage to Ted Castle in 1944, she became the housing correspondent at the Daily Mirror.

== Member of Parliament (1945–1979) ==
In the 1945 general election, which Labour won by a landslide, Castle was elected as a Member of Parliament for Blackburn. As Blackburn was then a two-member constituency, she was elected alongside fellow Labour candidate John Edwards. Castle had secured her place as a parliamentary candidate through the women of the Blackburn Labour Party, who had threatened to quit unless she was added to the otherwise all-male shortlist.

Castle was the youngest of the handful of women elected. (Note: Throughout Castle's parliamentary career (1945–1979), women Members of Parliament consistently represented less than 5% of all MPs.) Although she had grown up in similar northern industrial towns, she had no prior connection to Blackburn. Eager not to appear as a parachute candidate, she studied weaving and spinning, and spent time living with a local family. In her maiden speech she highlighted the problems facing servicemen then going through demobilization.

Immediately upon her entering the House of Commons Castle was appointed Parliamentary private secretary (PPS) to Stafford Cripps, President of the Board of Trade, who had known her as a member of the pre-war Socialist League. Harold Wilson succeeded Cripps in 1947 and retained Castle as his PPS, marking the beginning of the pair's lengthy political relationship. She gained further experience as the UK's alternate delegate to the United Nations General Assembly for 1949–1950, when she displayed particular concern for social and humanitarian issues. She soon achieved a reputation as a left-winger and a rousing speaker. She was an early advocate for equal pay and supported the Equal Pay Campaign Committee in their cross-party efforts. In 1954 she joined Patricia Ford, Irene Ward and Edith Summerskill to submit the 'Equal Pay in the public services' petition, with over 80,000 signatures, to Parliament. The four politicians arrived together in a horse drawn carriage decorated in suffragette colours. During the 1950s she was a high-profile Bevanite, and made a name for herself as a vocal advocate of decolonisation and the Anti-Apartheid Movement.

=== Cabinet minister ===
==== Minister for Overseas Development, 1964–1965 ====
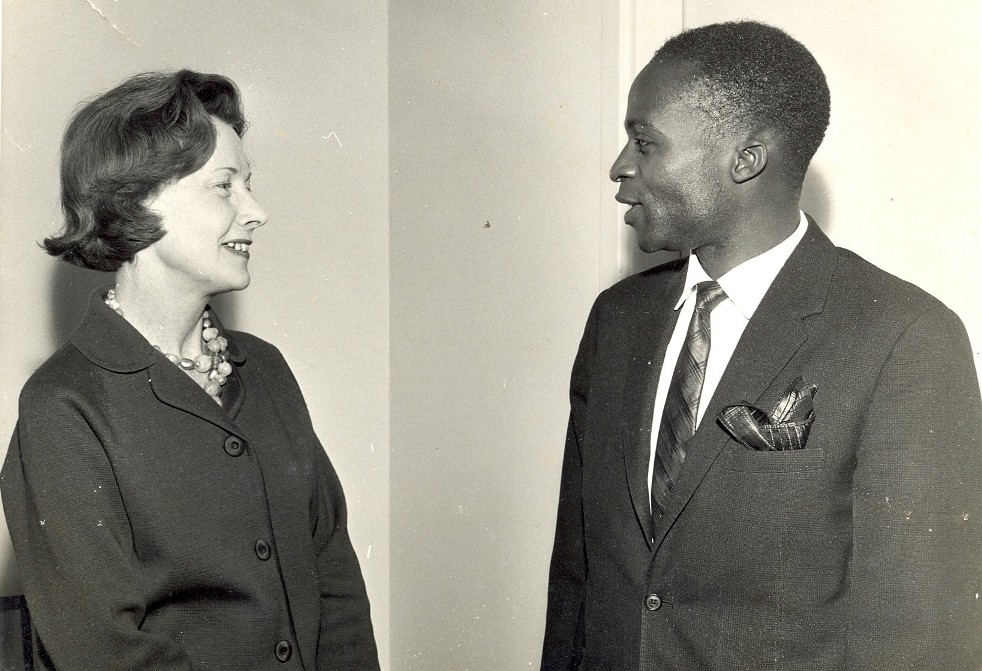
Castle as Minister for Overseas Development meeting John Tembo, Malawi Minister of Finance, 1965

Labour returned to government under Harold Wilson in October 1964 following a general election, defeating Alec Douglas-Home's Conservative government by winning a slim majority of four seats, thus ending 13 years of successive Conservative governments. Wilson had selected his core Cabinet four months prior to the election; Castle knew Wilson intended to place her within his Cabinet, which would make her the fourth woman in British history ever to hold position in a Cabinet, after Margaret Bondfield, Ellen Wilkinson and Florence Horsbrugh.

Castle entered the Cabinet as the first Minister for Overseas Development, a newly created ministry for which she, alongside the Fabian Society, had drawn up the plans. For the previous year she had acted as the opposition spokeswoman on overseas development. Castle's plans were extensive, though the ministry's budget was modest. She set about trying to divert powers from other departments related to overseas aid, including the Foreign Office and the Treasury. She was only partially successful in her aims and provoked an internal Whitehall dispute in the process.

In June 1965 Castle announced interest-free aid loans would be available to certain (not exclusively Commonwealth) countries. She had previously criticised the Conservative government for granting loans that only waived interest for up to the first seven years, which she considered to be counter-productive.

In August, Castle published the government white paper Overseas Development: The Work of a New Ministry. The financial commitments of the ministry were omitted from the report, after a protracted clash between Castle and her cabinet colleagues James Callaghan (Chancellor of the Exchequer) and George Brown (Secretary of State for Economic Affairs). Labour had made a manifesto promise to increase aid spending to 1% of gross national product, almost double Conservative spending. However, the national economy was unstable, public resentment towards the Commonwealth was growing due to immigration, and within Cabinet aid was viewed with either indifference or contempt. Castle grappled with Callaghan and Brown over the department's budgetary allocation; they reached a compromise following Wilson's intervention, but the sum only amounted to a small increase in spending.

==== Minister of Transport, 1965–1968 ====
Initially reluctant to head up the department, Castle accepted the role of Minister of Transport (23 December 1965 – 6 April 1968) in a Cabinet reshuffle after Wilson proved persuasive.

In February 1966, Castle addressed Parliament, calling for "a profound change in public attitudes" to curtail increasing road fatality figures, stating: "Hitler did not manage to kill as many civilians in Britain as have been killed on our roads since the war". The statistics bore out; between 1945 and the mid-1960s approximately 150,000 people were killed and several million injured on Britain's roads.

She introduced the breathalyser to combat the then recently acknowledged crisis of drink-driving. Castle said she was "ready to risk unpopularity" by introducing the measures if it meant saving lives. She was challenged by a BBC journalist on The World This Weekend, who described the policy as a "rotten idea" and asked her: "You're only a woman, you don't drive, what do you know about it?" In the 12 months following the introduction of the breathalyser, Government figures revealed road deaths had dropped by 16.5%.

Castle also made permanent the national speed limit (70 mph). Having been introduced as a four-month trial by outgoing Transport Minister Tom Fraser in December 1965, Castle first extended the limit period in 1966 and in 1967 made the limit permanent, following a controversial report from the Road Research Laboratory concluding that motorway casualties had fallen 20% since its introduction.

During a tour of New York City in October 1966, where Castle was examining the impact of traffic problems in American cities, she vocalised plans to introduce a London congestion charge, which was to be introduced as soon as the technical details of fee collection were solved. Castle urged New York's Transport Commissioner to adopt the same policy, describing plans for more roadways as "self-defeating", stating the solution was "more and better mass transit systems".

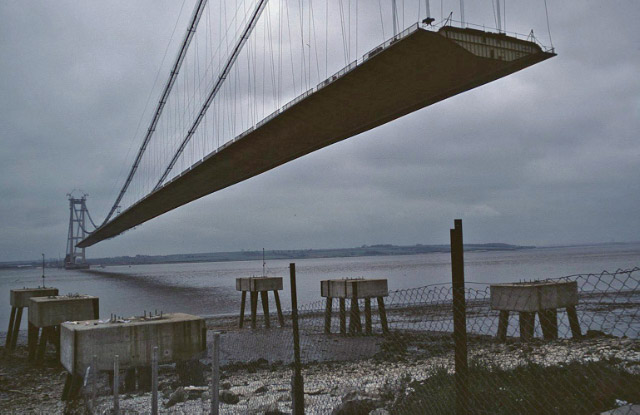
Castle authorised the construction of the Humber Bridge (pictured in 1980, prior to completion)

Castle also sanctioned the construction of the Humber Bridge, which was the world's longest suspension bridge upon its opening in 1981. In late 1965, the Labour MP for nearby Kingston upon Hull North died, triggering a by-election. The marginal seat was of critical importance to the government and its loss would have reduced Labour's majority in the House of Commons to just one. Harold Wilson invoked Castle to find the necessary funding and promise the bridge's construction as an 'election sweetener'. The move paid off, with Labour holding the seat.

She presided over the closure of approximately 2,050 miles of railways as she enacted her part of the Beeching cuts—a betrayal of pre-election commitments by the Labour party to halt the proposals. Nevertheless, she refused closure of several lines, one example being the Looe Valley Line in Cornwall, and introduced the first Government rail subsidies for socially necessary but unprofitable railways in the Transport Act 1968.

One of her most memorable achievements as Transport minister was to pass legislation decreeing that all new cars had to be fitted with seat belts. Despite being appointed to the Ministry of Transport, a role which she was originally unenthusiastic about, Castle could not actually drive herself, and was chauffeured to functions. (The Labour politician Hazel Blears recalled driving Castle at one time as a young Labour Party activist in the 1980s.) Despite her lack of a driving licence, she attracted controversy when she told local government leaders to give added emphasis to motor vehicle access in urban areas, as "most pedestrians are walking to or from their cars."

Castle and her husband, Edward Castle, bought a new flat in John Spencer Square in late 1967 while she was the Minister of Transport.

==== First Secretary of State and Secretary of State for Employment, 1968–1970 ====
As Secretary of State for Employment, Castle was also appointed First Secretary of State by Wilson, bringing her firmly into the heart of government. She was never far from controversy which reached a fever pitch when the trade unions rebelled against her proposals to reduce their powers in her 1969 white paper, 'In Place of Strife'. This also involved a major cabinet split, with threatened resignations, hot tempers and her future nemesis James Callaghan breaking ranks to publicly try to undermine the bill. The whole episode alienated her from many of her friends on the left, with the Tribune newspaper railing very hard against the bill, which they held to be attacking the workers without attacking the bosses. The split is often said to have been partly responsible for Labour's defeat at the 1970 general election. The eventual deal with the unions dropped most of the contentious clauses.

Castle also helped make history when she intervened in the Ford sewing machinists' strike of 1968, in which the women of the Dagenham Ford Plant demanded to be paid the same as their male counterparts. She helped resolve the strike, which resulted in a pay rise for Ford's female workers bringing them to 92 per cent of what the men received. Most significantly, as a consequence of this strike, Castle put through the Equal Pay Act 1970. A 2010 British film, Made in Dagenham, was based on the Ford strike. She was portrayed by Miranda Richardson.

In April 1970, Castle's husband, Ted, lost his position as an alderman of the Greater London Council. He was devastated and although he was supportive of his wife's achievements, he considered himself a failure compared to her. Upset and concerned by her husband's distress, Barbara persuaded Wilson to grant Ted a peerage.

=== Opposition ===
In May 1970, Wilson called a general election, held on 18 June. The Conservative Party, led by Edward Heath, enjoyed a surprise victory, despite opinion polling indicating a steady lead for Labour in the run-up. Castle privately blamed complacency within Labour for their loss and had expressed scepticism about their poll lead, writing in her diaries: "I have a haunting feeling there is a silent majority sitting behind its lace curtains waiting to come out and vote Tory."

In the immediate aftermath of the government's defeat, Castle found she was out of favour with Wilson. The day following the general election, Wilson held a final inner Cabinet meeting at Downing Street, to which Castle was not invited. Eager to make contact, she later called him at Chequers, where Wilson engaged in a brusque telephone conversation with her.

Refusing to acknowledge her career had been curtailed, Castle proposed to run for deputy leadership of the Parliamentary Labour Party. When she informed Wilson of her plans he was furious; Castle's reputation within the party had been damaged by the failure of In Place of Strife and Wilson censured her, claiming her plan would split the party. In an act of retribution for her challenge to the deputy leadership, Wilson impeded Ted Castle's peerage, which he had all but promised prior to the general election.

Despite not being elected to the Shadow Cabinet, Castle remained as the Labour shadow spokesperson on Employment. The new Government introduced many of her policy suggestions as part of their Industrial Relations Act. When she was attacking the Conservative bill, the government simply pointed to her own white paper, following which Wilson reshuffled her first to the health portfolio and then out of the shadow cabinet.

=== Return to Cabinet ===
==== Secretary of State for Social Services, 1974–1976 ====
Despite having been on the Labour back benches since 1972 and not part of the shadow cabinet, in 1974, following Harold Wilson's defeat of Edward Heath, Castle became Secretary of State for Social Services. While serving in this position, Castle started the Invalid Care Allowance as part of a wide range of innovative welfare reforms. She sought to remove private "pay beds" from the National Health Service (NHS), in conflict with the British Medical Association.

In the 1975 referendum debate Castle took a Eurosceptic stance. During a debate with Liberal leader Jeremy Thorpe he asked her whether, if the vote would be yes, she would stay on as a minister. To this she replied: "If the vote is yes my country will need me to save it." Despite her views she later became a Member of the European Parliament (1979–1989). Her public support of leaving the EEC infuriated Wilson. Castle recorded in her diary and in her subsequent autobiography that Wilson summoned her to Downing Street where he angrily accused her of disloyalty and that, as he had brought her back into the cabinet against others' wishes and advice, he deserved better from her. Castle claimed she offered to resign, but Wilson calmed down and she continued to campaign for leaving in the referendum.

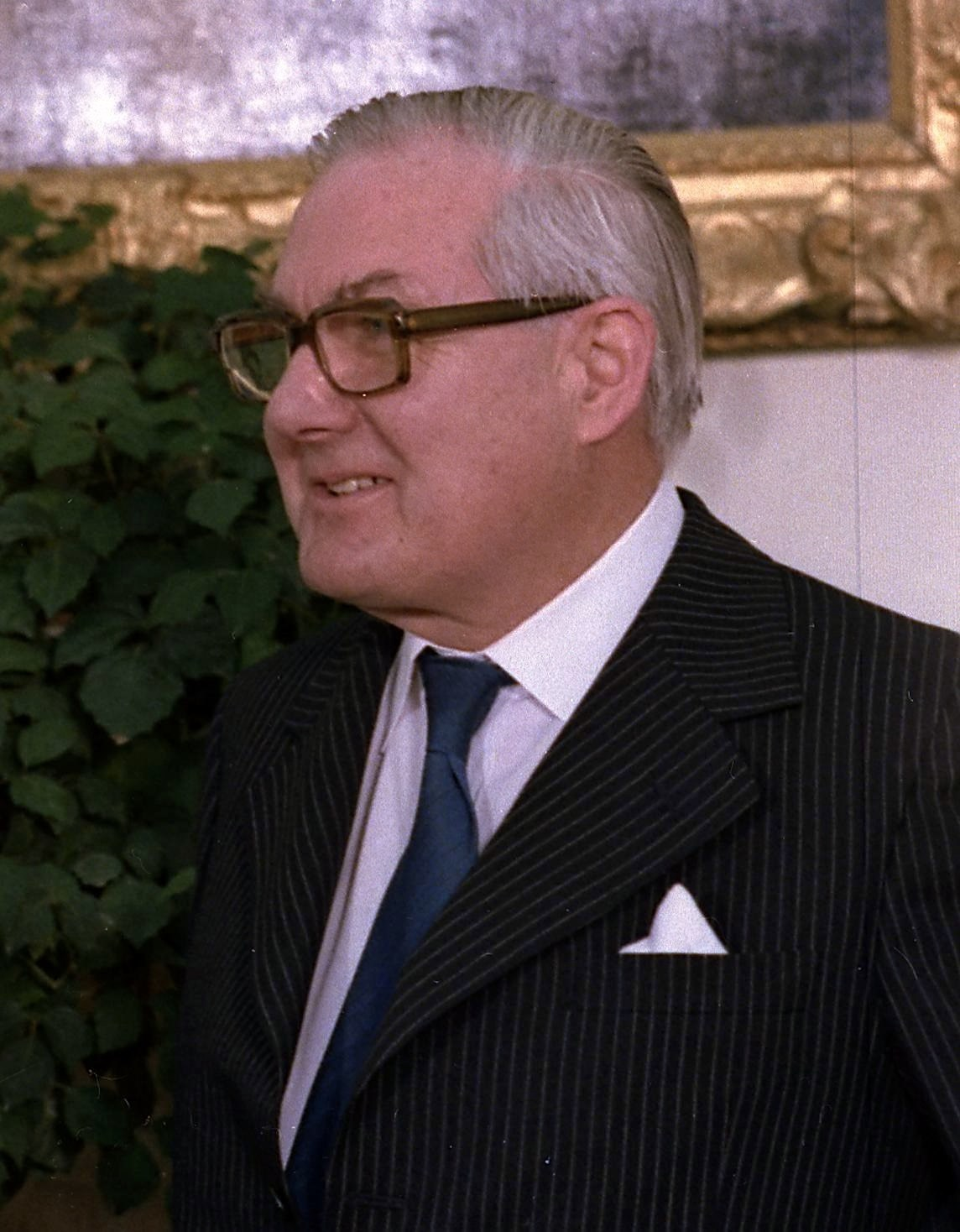
James Callaghan removed Castle from his Cabinet

In 1975, Castle introduced the Child Benefit Act, superseding the Family Allowances Act 1945. The act provided new support for families' first child, unlike the previous system in place, which provided benefit for second and subsequent children. Castle also ensured child benefit would be paid directly to mothers, not fathers, unlike Family Allowance, the previous system in place. The legislation faced opposition from unions whose male members would receive less take-home pay with the loss of Family Allowance.

Castle remained in cabinet until Wilson's resignation in March 1976. The head of the Downing Street policy unit, Bernard Donoughue, records in his diary that he warned Wilson that Castle's dogged pursuit of personal policy stances on public health would "wreck the NHS". Donoughue claims that Wilson agreed, but admitted he would leave it to his successor to resolve.

Castle lost her place as a Cabinet minister when her bitter political enemy James Callaghan succeeded Wilson as prime minister following a leadership election. Although he left Wilson's Cabinet virtually unchanged, he dismissed Castle almost immediately upon taking office, in the midst of a complex health bill that she was steering through the House of Commons at the time. Although he had not yet decided on her successor at the time he fired her, Callaghan removed her under the pretext he wanted to lower the average age of his Cabinet, which she regarded as a "phoney reason". In an interview years later, she remarked that perhaps the most restrained thing she had ever achieved in her life was not to reply with "Then why not start with yourself, Jim?" (Callaghan was four years older than Wilson, the man he was replacing, and less than 18 months younger than Castle). Castle was angry to discover that Wilson had broken a private confidence in informing Callaghan that she had intended to retire from the cabinet before the next election.

== European Parliament (1979–1989) ==
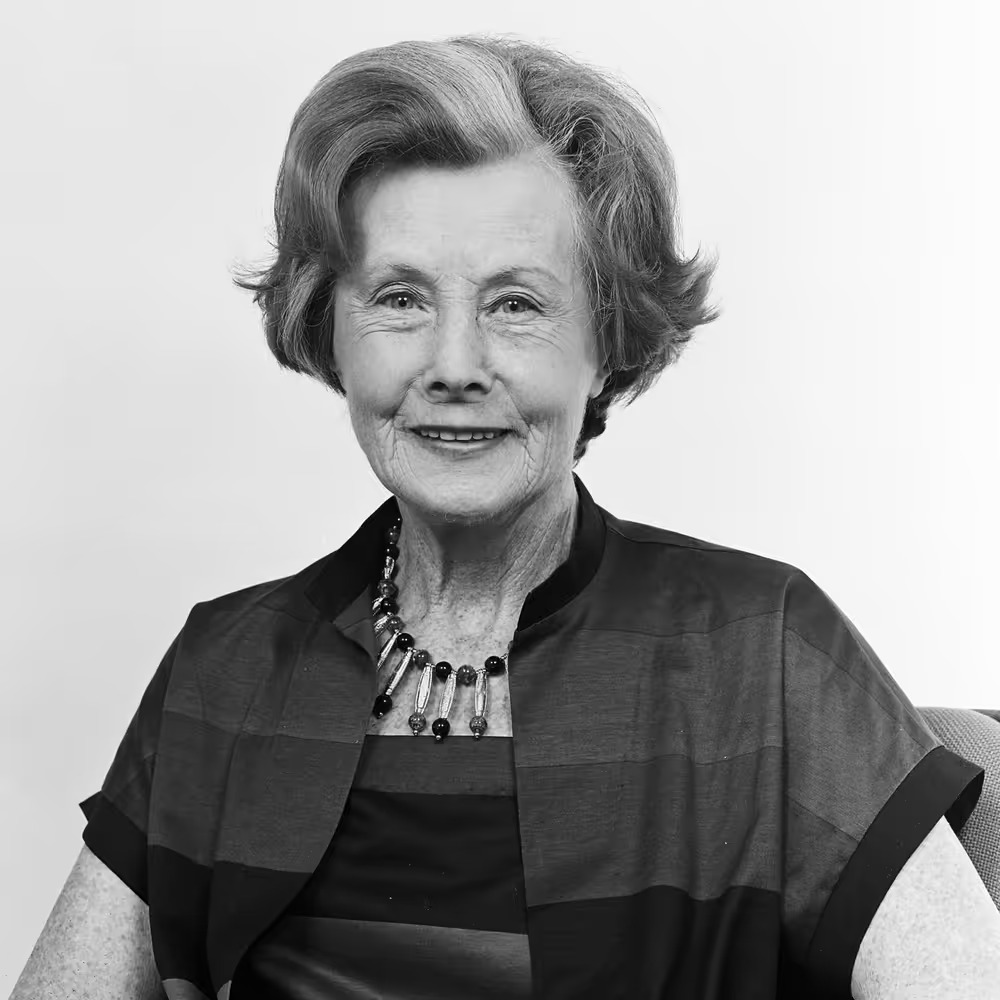
Barbara Castle in 1984

Less than a month after she left Westminster in 1979 she stood for and was elected to the European Parliament, writing in the Tribune that "politics is not just about policies: it is about fighting for them in every available forum and at every opportunity." In 1982 she wrote in the New Statesman that Labour should abandon its opposition to British membership of the EEC and that the UK should fight its corner inside it. This led her former ally Ian Mikardo to say to her: "Your name is mud".

She represented Greater Manchester North from 1979 to 1984, and was then elected to represent Greater Manchester West from 1984 to 1989. She was at that time the only British MEP to have held a cabinet position.

Castle led Labour's delegation in the European Parliament. She also served as vice-chair of the Socialist Group, a member of the Committee on Agriculture, Fisheries and Rural Development, and a member of the Delegation for Relations with Malta.

The Castle Diaries were published in two volumes in 1980 and 1984, chronicling her time in office from 1964 to 1976 and providing insights into the workings of cabinet government. Edmund Dell, reviewing the diaries that cover the years 1974–76 in the London Review of Books, wrote that the volume "shows more about the nature of cabinet government – even though it deals with only one Cabinet – than any previous publication, academic, political or biographical. It is, I think, better than Crossman". Michael Foot in the Listener claimed that the book, "whatever else it is or not, is a human document, hopelessly absorbing". Paul Johnson wrote in the Sunday Telegraph that it was "a contribution of first-rate importance to our knowledge of modern politics".

== Life peer ==
In 1974 Ted Castle was made a life peer. This meant that Barbara was now formally Lady Castle, though she chose not to use this courtesy title. Ted Castle died in 1979. On 16 July 1990 she was created a life peer in her own right, as Baroness Castle of Blackburn, of Ibstone in the County of Buckinghamshire. She remained active in politics up until her death, attacking the then Chancellor of the Exchequer, Gordon Brown, at the Labour party conference in 2001 for his refusal to link pensions to earnings.

Castle was a critic of Blairism and "New Labour", in particular on economic policy, which she perceived as involving acceptance of "market economics, unchallenged globalisation and the dominance of the multinationals". She also accused Blairites of distorting and dismissing the Labour Party's past, stating in an interview published in the New Statesman in 2000, the year of the party's centenary:

They do not seem to have realised that all governments, whatever their complexion, end in apparent failure. Macmillan was triumphant in 1959 and was biting the dust shortly afterwards. Heath won in 1970, and spent three and half years doing U-turns, looking for the perfect answer. Thatcher was a remarkable woman, but her premiership ended in ignominy. But the current leadership seems preoccupied by the failing of Labour in power and in opposition."

== Death ==
Barbara Castle died of pneumonia and chronic lung disease at Hell Corner Farm, her home in Ibstone, Buckinghamshire, on 3 May 2002.

== Legacy ==
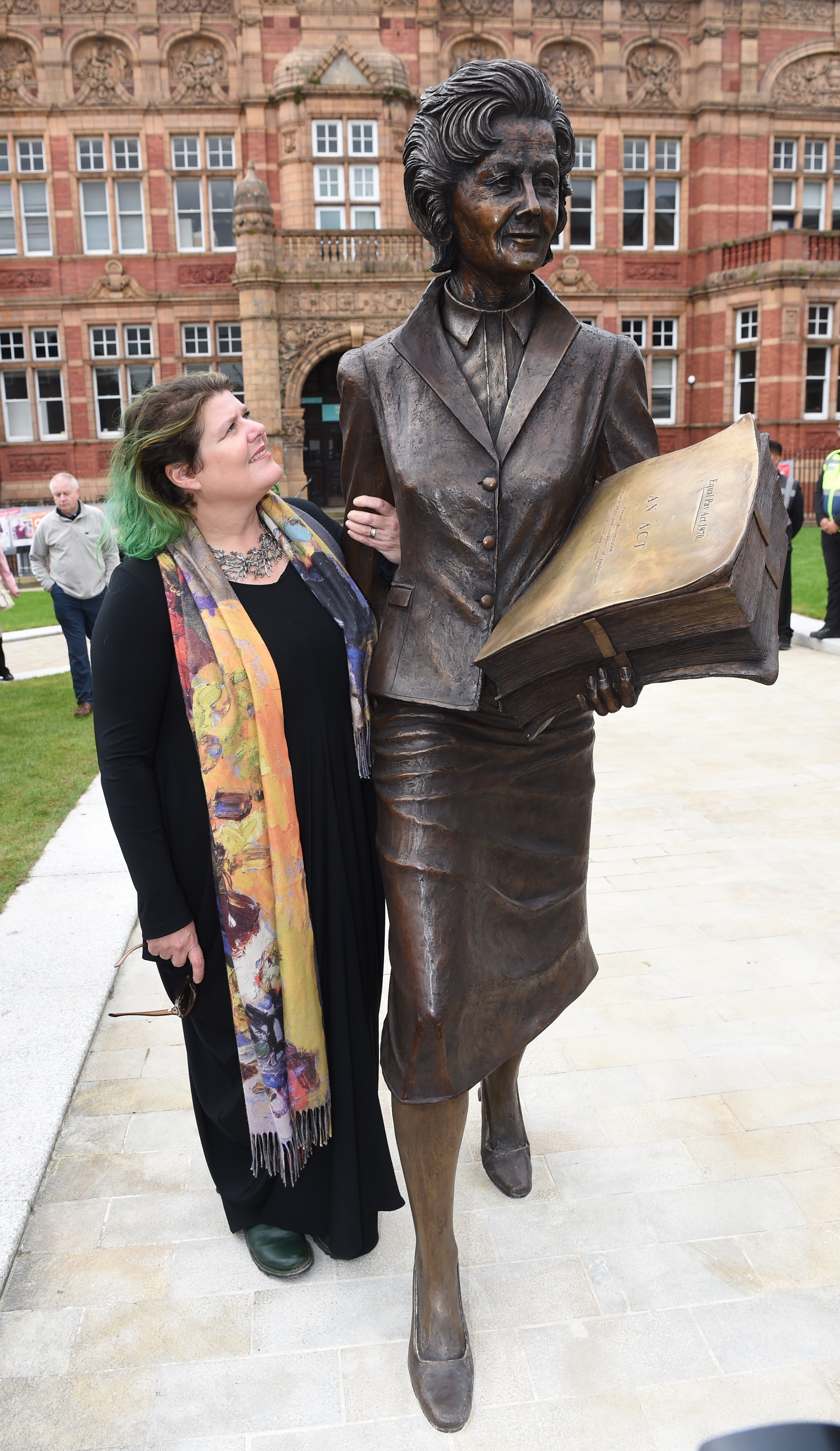
Artist Sam Holland with her bronze statue of Castle in Jubilee Square, Blackburn

Castle has been acknowledged as the most important female Labour politician of the 20th century. An adept and gripping orator, Castle gained a reputation as a strong-willed, sometimes single-minded crusader. Political commentator Andrew Marr wrote of Castle in 1993: "Performance has been at the centre of her career. She makes excellent television and was a good Commons speaker. But she was really made for the platform, either at Labour conferences or during election campaigns. There, her wit, self-confidence and theatricality were displayed. A good Castle speech is unforgettable."

She was admired by Bill Deedes, Conservative politician and editor of The Daily Telegraph, for "her astonishing tenacity, her capacity for getting her own way in Cabinet and nearly everywhere else," though he derided her politics. To her allies, Castle was loyal and would fiercely defend them. Colleague Roy Hattersley credited her with saving his career by insisting he remain her junior Minister when Harold Wilson attempted to sack him. Nevertheless, she remained unforgiving of her enemies; when questioned on James Callaghan in a 2000 interview in the New Statesman, Castle said: "I think it is safest all round if I don't comment on him."

Referred to disparagingly by fellow Labour MP Gerald Kaufman as "the Norma Desmond of politics [...] always ready for her close-up", she was noted for always paying particular attention to her appearance. Variously described as sophisticated, stylish and glamorous, Castle was also characterised as vain, while her critics called her egocentric. Former Labour leader Neil Kinnock recalled she was distraught when her hairdresser cancelled before a television appearance; in response, Castle said: "If you're a woman in the public eye, getting your hair nice is a constant preoccupation." Her weekly appointments with her hairdresser were "an essential Friday engagement" according to Hattersley, although she occasionally wore a wig – which she nicknamed Lucy – for public appearances without the benefit of her hairdresser to hand.

In 2008, Castle was named by The Guardian as one of four of "Labour's greatest heroes" and in 2016 she was named on BBC Radio 4's Woman's Hour Power List as one of seven women judged to have had the biggest impact on women's lives over the past 70 years, alongside Margaret Thatcher, Helen Brook, Germaine Greer, Jayaben Desai, Bridget Jones, and Beyoncé. Several women politicians have cited Castle as an inspiration for embarking on their careers, including Shadow Foreign Secretary Emily Thornberry, Tulip Siddiq, and former Conservative MP Edwina Currie.

Since Castle's death there had been several plans mooted to memorialise her with a statue in her constituency town of Blackburn. In October 2021 a bronze statue of her was unveiled in Blackburn. The sculptor was Sam Holland. Castle is caught in mid-stride as she carries a copy of the Equal Pay Act 1970. In the town a dual carriageway that constitutes part of the ring road is named Barbara Castle Way.

She was commemorated on a postage stamp issued as part of the Royal Mail's Women of Distinction series in 2008 for piloting the Equal Pay Act through parliament. She appears on the 81p denomination.

Castle was portrayed by British actress Miranda Richardson in the 2010 film Made in Dagenham, dealing with the 1968 strike at the Ford Dagenham assembly plant. She was later portrayed by stage actress Sophie-Louise Dann in the 2014 West End musical adaptation of the film. In the third series of Netflix drama The Crown, Castle is portrayed by Lorraine Ashbourne. In the BBC One drama The Trial of Christine Keeler (2019–2020) Castle is portrayed by Buffy Davis.

== Honours and awards ==
Barbara Castle was a recipient of the Order of the Companions of O. R. Tambo in Silver, a South African award to foreign nationals for friendship with that country. In a statement the South African government recognised Castle's "outstanding contribution to the struggle against apartheid, and the establishment of a non-sexist, non-racial and democratic South Africa". Castle was an active supporter of the Anti-Apartheid Movement (AAM) in Britain from the very start of its existence.

In 1990 Castle received a Cross of the Order of Merit of the Federal Republic of Germany for "services to European democracy".

In 1998 Castle was awarded an honorary degree by the University of Cambridge.

In 2002 Castle was posthumously awarded an honorary doctorate by the Open University for public service in areas of special educational concern to the university.

In September 2008 Northern Rail, Blackburn with Darwen Borough Council and the PTEG (Passenger Transport Executive Group) named a train after her. The plaque was unveiled by Castle's niece, Sonya Hinton, and Ruth Kelly MP, then Secretary of State for Transport. A commemorative brochure was produced by the PTEG for the event.

== Books by Barbara Castle ==
- The Castle Diaries, 1974–1976, Weidenfeld & Nicolson, 1980. ISBN 9780297774204
- The Castle Diaries, 1964–1970, Weidenfeld & Nicolson, 1984. ISBN 9780297783749
- Sylvia and Christabel Pankhurst, Penguin Books, 1987. ISBN 9780140087611
- Fighting All the Way, Macmillan, 1993. ISBN 9780333590317

== See also ==
- List of members of the European Parliament for the United Kingdom (1979–1984)
- List of members of the European Parliament for the United Kingdom (1984–1989)
- Ford sewing machinists strike of 1968
- In Place of Strife
- Rail subsidies

== Notes ==
Parliament of the United Kingdom
Preceded by Sir George Elliston and Sir Walter Smiles	Member of Parliament for Blackburn; 1945–1950; With: John Edwards	Constituency abolished (split into east and west divisions)
New constituency	Member of Parliament for Blackburn East; 1950–1955	Constituency abolished
New constituency	Member of Parliament for Blackburn; 1955–1979	Succeeded by Jack Straw
European Parliament
New constituency	Member of the European Parliament for Greater Manchester; 1979–1989	Succeeded by Gary Titley
Political offices
New post	Minister for Overseas Development; 1964–1965	Succeeded by Anthony Greenwood
Preceded by Tom Fraser	Minister for Transport; 1965–1968	Succeeded by Richard Marsh
Preceded by Ray Gunter	Secretary of State for Employment; 1968–1970	Succeeded by Robert Carr
Preceded by Michael Stewart	First Secretary of State; 1968–1970	Succeeded by Michael Heseltine
Preceded by Keith Joseph	Secretary of State for Social Services; 1974–1976	Succeeded by David Ennals
Party political offices
Preceded by Tom Driberg	Chair of the Labour Party; 1958–1959	Succeeded by George Brinham
Preceded by John Prescott	Leader of the European Parliamentary Labour Party; 1979–1985	Succeeded by Alf Lomas
