= Edward Castle, Baron Castle =

British politician (1907–1979)

The Right Honourable The Lord Castle
- Born: 5 May 1907; Sunningwell, Oxfordshire, England
- Died: 26 December 1979 (aged 72); Wycombe, Buckinghamshire, England
- Occupations: Journalist, politician
- Political party: Labour
- Spouse: Barbara Castle (m. 1944)

Edward Cyril Castle, Baron Castle, (5 May 1907 – 26 December 1979) was a British journalist and Labour Party politician. Between 1975 and 1979 he was a member of the European Parliament. He was married to Barbara Castle, a member of the House of Commons for 34 years.

== Early life ==
Castle, the son of Frederick J Castle of Foxcombe Hill, Oxford, attended Abingdon School from 1918 to 1920 as well as Portsmouth Grammar School and, after completing his school education, began working as a journalist.

== Journalistic career ==
Castle became news editor at the Manchester Evening News in 1932 before leaving in 1943 to become the night editor for the Daily Mirror.

During this time he met the young Labour politician Barbara Anne Betts, whom he married in July 1944.

In 1944 he became deputy editor-in-chief of the Picture Post and, later, its editor and publisher, before being succeeded by Tom Hopkinson.

== Political career ==
Castle started his own political career in 1964. In that year the first elections to the Greater London Council (GLC) were held. He was chosen by the Labour Party group on the GLC to be an alderman, serving a six-year term until 1970. He also was an alderman of the council of the London Borough of Islington.

By a Letters Patent of 18 June 1974 he was created a life peer with the title Baron Castle, of Islington in Greater London, and was a member of the House of Lords until his death.

From 3 July 1975 until his death in 1979 he served as a Member of the European Parliament, and was one of the first representatives of the Labour Party in the European Parliament.

== See also ==
- List of Old Abingdonians
