= Norvela Forster =

British businesswoman, explorer and politician

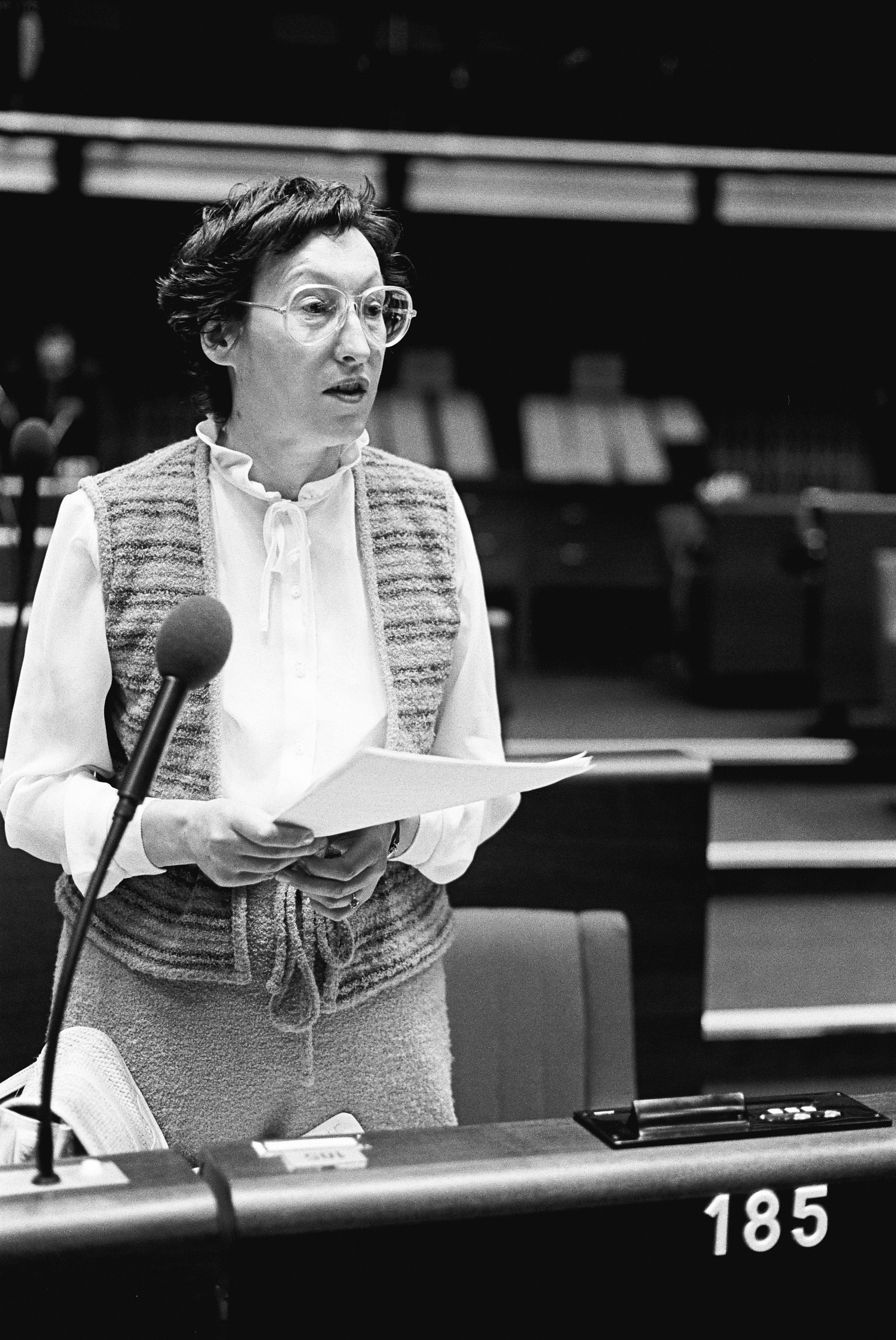
- Forster in the European Parliament in May 1981

Member of the European Parliament for Birmingham South
- In office 7 June 1979 – 14 June 1984

Personal details
- Born: 25 July 1931 Gillingham, Kent, United Kingdom
- Died: 30 April 1993 (aged 61) London
- Party: Conservative
- Spouse: Michael Jones (m. 1981)

Norvela Felicia Forster (25 July 1931 – 30 April 1993) was a United Kingdom businesswoman, exporter and politician.

== Education ==
Born in Gillingham, Kent, Forster attended South Wilts Grammar School for Girls, Salisbury, and Bedford College, University of London, where she was President of the Union Society and obtained a Bachelor of Science degree in chemistry. She joined Imperial Chemical Industries at Billingham after working for them during a university vacation, but was swiftly moved from the laboratories to management.

== ICI management ==
In 1960 she was made an assistant to Richard Beeching, the technical director who ran the company's development department. She recalled that at one point the department had the idea of filling a railway carriage with all their latest products and taking it around the country to demonstrate to customers; when Beeching asked where to get such a carriage, she did not know. The next day she heard of Beeching's appointment to the British Transport Commission overlooking British Rail. In the mid-1960s she worked on licensing plastics produced at the ICI plant in Welwyn Garden City. She also served on Hampstead Borough Council as a Conservative from 1962 to 1965.

== Management consultancy ==
Forster left ICI in 1966, determined to use her experience to read for the Bar and become a patent attorney. To pay her way she worked as a business consultant, but when she secured a particularly big job in January 1968, she found she had no time to continue her studies and became a full-time consultant. By 1970, being self-employed was becoming impractical so she established Industrial Aids Limited as a consultancy business. The business grew rapidly and allowed her to indulge her hobby of yacht racing.

== European Parliament ==
She became more involved in politics as a member of the Bow Group council. At the 1979 European Parliament election she was elected as Member of the European Parliament for Birmingham South, a marginal constituency which had been expected to go to the Labour Party. Her instinctive support for free trade came under pressure when she saw that only state subsidies would maintain competition involving private companies competing against nationalised steel companies.

== Airline inquiry ==
In 1981 she married Michael Jones, but retained her maiden name in her political life. She made a study of the operation of Chambers of Commerce in the United Kingdom and other EEC member states, which was published in 1983. That year she was rapporteur on an inquiry into air traffic; her report which recommended a removal of the cartels which set air fares, and a system of rapid resolution of disputes between airlines, was rejected by a majority in the European Parliament which sought to preserve the existing system.

Forster was defeated after boundary changes in Birmingham East at the 1984 European Parliament election. She returned to business and became a member of the Council of the Management Consultancies Association.
