= Ford sewing machinists strike of 1968 =

Labor dispute in the United Kingdom

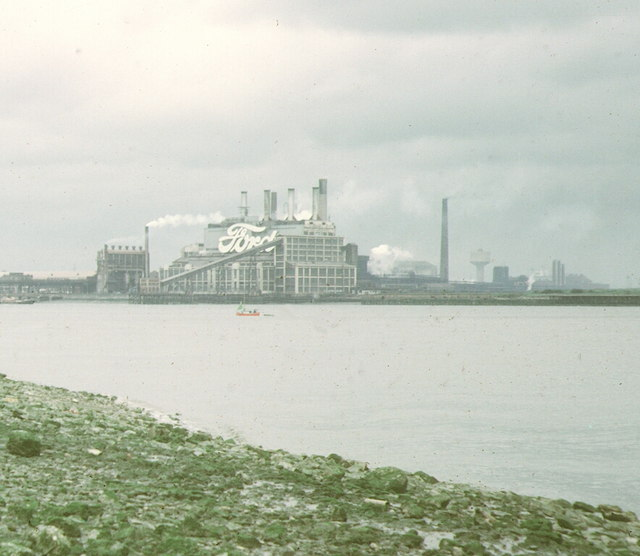
The Ford Dagenham plant, pictured in 1973

The Ford sewing machinists strike of 1968 was a landmark labour-relations dispute in the United Kingdom. It was a trigger cause of the passing of the Equal Pay Act 1970.

== Strike action ==
The strike, led by Rose Boland, Eileen Pullen, Vera Sime, Gwen Davis, Violet Dawson, and Sheila Douglass, began on 7 June 1968, when women sewing machinists at Ford Motor Company Limited's Dagenham plant in London walked out, followed later by the machinists at Ford's Halewood Body & Assembly plant. The women made car seat covers and as stock ran out the strike eventually resulted in a halt to all car production at the Dagenham factory.

The Dagenham sewing machinists walked out when, as part of a regrading exercise, they were informed that their jobs were graded in Category C (less skilled production jobs), instead of Category B (more skilled production jobs), and that they would be paid 15% less than the full B rate received by men. At the time it was common practice for companies to pay women less than men, irrespective of the skills involved.

Following the intervention of Barbara Castle, the Secretary of State for Employment and Productivity in Harold Wilson's government, the strike ended three weeks after it began, as a result of a deal that immediately increased their rate of pay to 8% below that of men, rising to the full category B rate the following year. A court of inquiry (under the Industrial Courts Act 1919) was also set up to consider their regrading, although this failed to find in their favour. The women were only regraded into Category B following a further six-week strike in 1984.

== Impact ==
Inspired by the example of the machinists, women trades unionists founded the National Joint Action Campaign Committee for Women's Equal Rights (NJACCWER), which held an "equal pay demonstration" attended by 1,000 people in Trafalgar Square on 18 May 1969.

The movement ultimately resulted in the passing of the Equal Pay Act 1970, which came into force in 1975 and which did, for the first time, aim to prohibit inequality of treatment between men and women in Britain in terms of pay and conditions of employment. In the second reading debate of the bill, MP Shirley Summerskill spoke of the machinists playing a "very significant part in the history of the struggle for equal pay".

Once the UK joined the EEC in 1973, it also became subject to Article 119 of the 1957 Treaty of Rome, which specified that men and women should receive equal pay for equal work.

Several streets in Dagenham Green, built on the site of the Ford stamping plant, are to be named for the women who led the strikes and the equal pay campaign.

== Film and stage versions ==
A film dramatisation of the 1968 strike, Made in Dagenham, with a screenplay by William Ivory, was released at the Toronto Film Festival in September 2010.

A musical adaptation of the film premièred in London in 2014. The production closed on 11 April 2015.

== See also ==
- Equal pay for women
- United Kingdom employment equality law
- Feminist movement
- Automotive industry in the United Kingdom
