= Yorkshire South West (European Parliament constituency) =

Former European Parliament constituency

- European Parliament constituency
- Boundary within Yorkshire and the Humber (1979-1984)
- Member state: United Kingdom
- Created: 1979
- Dissolved: 1999
- MEPs: 1

Sources
- United Kingdom Election Results

Yorkshire South West was a European Parliament constituency covering the southern parts of West Yorkshire in England and, at times, part of South Yorkshire.

Prior to its uniform adoption of proportional representation in 1999, the United Kingdom used first-past-the-post for the European elections in England, Scotland and Wales. The European Parliament constituencies used under that system were smaller than the later regional constituencies and only had one Member of the European Parliament each.

The area was later included in the Yorkshire and the Humber European Parliament Constituency, which was represented by seven members in 1999–2004 and six from 2004 onwards.

Boundary within Yorkshire and the Humber (1984-1994)

Boundary within Yorkshire and the Humber (1994-1999)

== Boundaries ==
1979–1984: Colne Valley; Dewsbury; Hemsworth; Huddersfield East; Huddersfield West; Normanton; Pontefract and Castleford; Wakefield.

1984–1994: Barnsley West and Penistone; Colne Valley; Dewsbury; Hemsworth; Huddersfield; Normanton; Pontefract and Castleford; Wakefield.

1994–1999: Batley and Spen; Colne Valley; Dewsbury; Hemsworth; Huddersfield; Normanton; Pontefract and Castleford; Wakefield.

== Members of the European Parliament ==
Elected	Name	Party
1979	Tom Megahy	Labour
1999	Constituency abolished: see Yorkshire and the Humber	

== Results ==
European Parliament election, 1979: Yorkshire South West
Party	Candidate	Votes	%	±%
Labour	Thomas Megahy	75,473	51.9	
Conservative	J. (Frances) Chambers	52,157	35.8	
Liberal	Pam Waudby	17,850	12.3	
Majority		23,316	16.1	
Turnout		145,480	29.0	
Labour win (new seat)				

European Parliament election, 1984: Yorkshire South West
Party	Candidate	Votes	%	±%
Labour	Thomas Megahy	88,464	55.4	+3.5
Conservative	Adrian J. A. Lodge	44,291	27.7	−8.1
Liberal	Jim F. Crossley	29,964	16.9	+4.6
Majority		44,173	27.7	+11.6
Turnout		162,719	30.8	+1.8
Labour hold		Swing		

European Parliament election, 1989: Yorkshire South West
Party	Candidate	Votes	%	±%
Labour	Thomas Megahy	108,444	58.0	+2.6
Conservative	G. T. A. W. (Toby) Horton	42,543	22.8	−4.9
Green	Sandra Leyland	25,677	13.7	New
SLD	David Ridgway	10,352	5.5	−11.4
Majority		65,901	35.2	+7.5
Turnout		187,016	35.7	+4.9
Labour hold		Swing		

European Parliament election, 1994: Yorkshire South West
Party	Candidate	Votes	%	±%
Labour	Thomas Megahy	94,025	59.2	+1.2
Conservative	Christine M. J. M. A. Adamson	34,463	21.7	−1.1
Liberal Democrats	David Ridgway	21,595	13.6	+8.1
Green	Andy Cooper	7,163	4.5	−9.2
Natural Law	Geoffrey S. Mead	1,674	1.0	New
Majority		59,562	37.5	+2.3
Turnout		64,895	29.0	−6.7
Labour hold		Swing		
