= Hampshire West (European Parliament constituency) =

Former European Parliament constituency

- European Parliament constituency
- Boundary within South West England (1979-1984)
- Member state: United Kingdom
- Created: 1979
- Dissolved: 1984
- MEPs: 1

Prior to its uniform adoption of proportional representation in 1999, the United Kingdom used first-past-the-post for the European elections in England, Scotland and Wales. The European Parliament constituencies used under that system were smaller than the later regional constituencies and only had one Member of the European Parliament each.

The constituency of Hampshire West was one of them.

It consisted of the Westminster Parliament constituencies of Basingstoke, Eastleigh, New Forest, Salisbury, Southampton Itchen, Southampton Test, and Winchester.

== Member of the European Parliament ==
Elected	Name	Party
1979	Basil de Ferranti	Conservative

== Results ==
European Parliament election, 1979: Hampshire West
Party	Candidate	Votes	%	±%
Conservative	Basil de Ferranti	114,978	58.9	
Liberal	J.W. Matthew	45,786	23.4	
Labour	P.S. Jariwala	34,472	17.7	
Majority		69,192	35.5	
Turnout		195,236	33.6	
Conservative win (new seat)				
