= Salop and Stafford (European Parliament constituency) =

Former European Parliament constituency

- European Parliament constituency
- Boundary within the West Midlands (1979-1984)
- Member state: United Kingdom
- Created: 1979
- Dissolved: 1984
- MEPs: 1

Prior to its uniform adoption of proportional representation in 1999, the United Kingdom used first-past-the-post for the European elections in England, Scotland and Wales. The European Parliament constituencies used under that system were smaller than the later regional constituencies and only had one Member of the European Parliament each.

The constituency of Salop and Stafford was one of them.

It consisted of the Westminster Parliament constituencies (on their 1974 boundaries) of Ludlow, Newcastle-under-Lyme, Oswestry, Shrewsbury, Stafford and Stone, Staffordshire South West, and The Wrekin.

== Members of the European Parliament ==
Elected	Members	Party
1979	Christopher Prout	Conservative
1984	Constituency abolished	

== Results ==
European Parliament election, 1979: Salop and Stafford
Party	Candidate	Votes	%	±%
Conservative	Christopher Prout	90,545	57.5	
Labour	J.S. Hopkins	45,547	28.9	
Liberal	T.G. Robson	16,469	10.5	
Ind. Conservative	Mrs. P.J.E. Larney	4,804	3.1	
Majority		44,998	28.6	
Turnout		157,365	32.2	
Conservative win (new seat)				
