= Kent East (European Parliament constituency) =

Former European Parliament constituency

- European Parliament constituency
- Boundary within South East England (1979-1984)
- Member state: United Kingdom
- Created: 1979
- Dissolved: 1999
- MEPs: 1

Prior to its uniform adoption of proportional representation in 1999, the United Kingdom used first-past-the-post for the European elections in England, Scotland and Wales. The European Parliament constituencies used under that system were smaller than the later regional constituencies and only had one Member of the European Parliament each. The constituency of Kent East was one of them.

Boundary within South East England and London (1984-1994)

Boundary within South East England and London (1994-1999)

== Boundaries ==
1979-1984: Ashford; Canterbury; Dover and Deal; Faversham; Folkestone and Hythe; Maidstone; Thanet East; Thanet West.

1984-1994: Ashford; Canterbury; Dover; Faversham; Folkestone and Hythe; Maidstone; Thanet North; Thanet South.

1994-1999: Ashford; Canterbury; Dover; Faversham; Folkestone and Hythe; Thanet North; Thanet South.

== MEPs ==
Elected	Member	Party
1979	Christopher Jackson	Conservative
1994	Mark Watts	Labour
1999	Constituency abolished: see South East England	

== Election results ==
European Parliament election, 1979: Kent East
Party	Candidate	Votes	%	±%
Conservative	Christopher Jackson	117,267	64.7	
Labour	J. C. M. S. Holmes	40,060	22.1	
Liberal	Anthony F. C. Morris	20,190	11.1	
Independent	D. J. Conlon	3,788	2.1	
Majority		77,207	42.6	
Turnout		181,305	32.4	
Conservative win (new seat)				

European Parliament election, 1984: Kent East
Party	Candidate	Votes	%	±%
Conservative	Christopher Jackson	92,340	52.5	−12.2
Labour	D. A. Enright	43,473	24.7	+2.6
SDP	Anthony A. Kinch	34,601	19.7	+8.6
Ecology	Steven M. Dawe	5,405	3.1	New
Majority		48,867	27.8	
Turnout		175,819	31.7	
Conservative hold		Swing		

European Parliament election, 1989: Kent East
Party	Candidate	Votes	%	±%
Conservative	Christopher Jackson	85,667	44.0	−8.5
Labour	Gregory N. J. Perry	56,706	29.1	+4.4
Green	Mrs. Penny A. Kemp	36,931	19.0	+15.9'"`UNIQ−−ref−00000016−QINU`"'
SLD	A. F. C. (Tony) Morris	15,470	7.9	−11.8
Majority		28,961	14.9	−12.9
Turnout		194,774	34.2	+2.5
Conservative hold		Swing		

European Parliament election, 1994: Kent East
Party	Candidate	Votes	%	±%
Labour	Mark Watts	69,641	34.5	+5.4
Conservative	Christopher Jackson	69,006	34.2	−9.8
Liberal Democrats	John R. Macdonald	44,549	22.1	+14.2
UKIP	Colin R. Bullen	9,414	4.7	New
Green	Steve M. Dawe	7,196	3.6	−15.4'"`UNIQ−−ref−00000020−QINU`"'
Natural Law	Colin J. Beckley	1,746	0.9	New
Majority		635	0.3	N/A
Turnout		201,552	40.3	
Labour gain from Conservative		Swing		
