= Thomas Megahy =

British teacher and politician

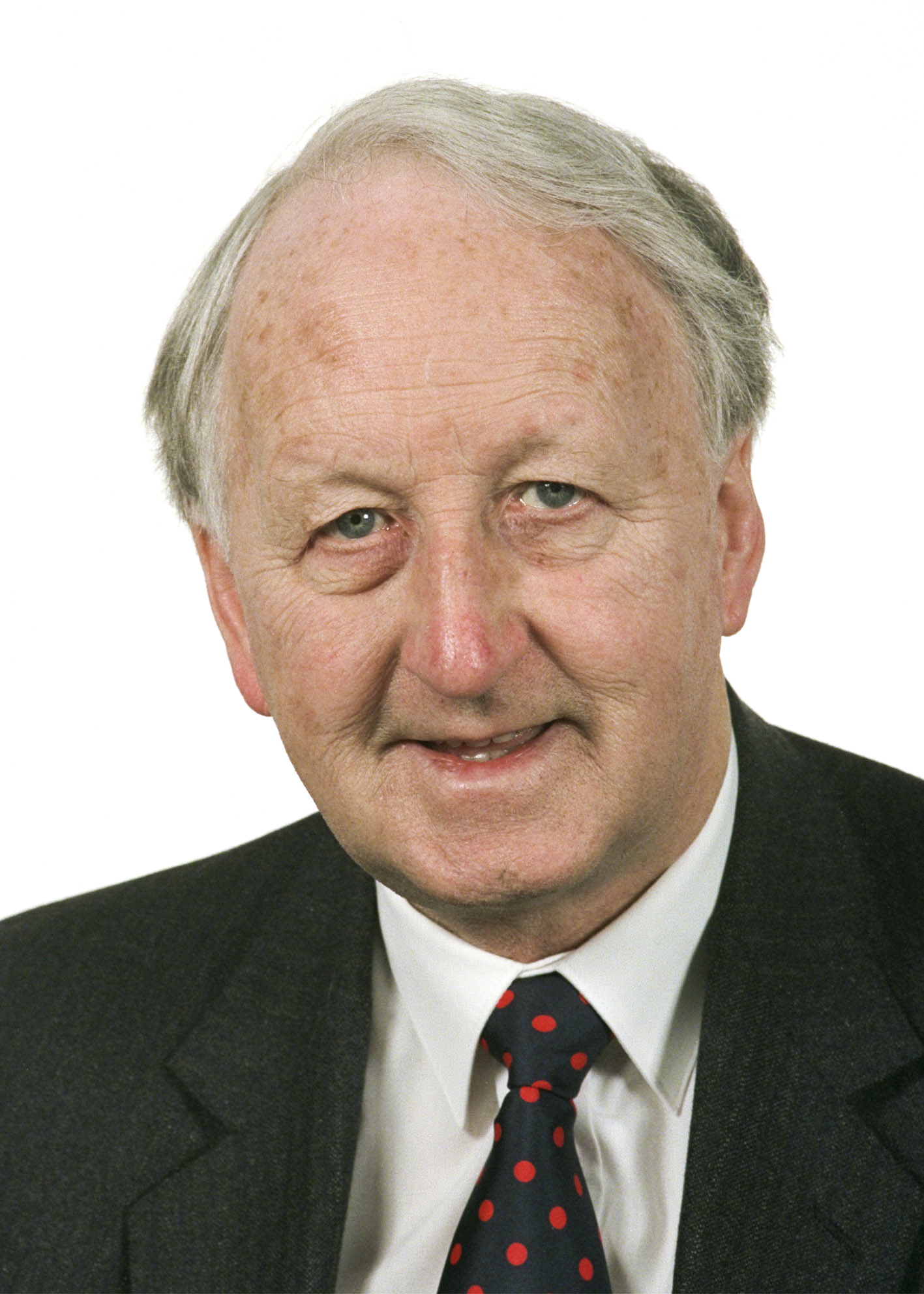
- Megahy in 1994

Member of the European Parliament
- In office 7 June 1979 – 15 June 1999
- Constituency: Yorkshire South West

Personal details
- Born: 16 July 1929 Lanarkshire, United Kingdom
- Died: 5 October 2008 (aged 79)
- Party: Labour
- Spouse: Jean
- Children: Ian, Alastair and Robin
- Occupation: Member of the European Parliament

Thomas Megahy MBE (16 July 1929 – 5 October 2008) was a British teacher and politician who served in the European Parliament.

Megahy was educated at Wishaw High School, Ruskin College, the Huddersfield College of Education and the University of London. He worked as a railway signalman, but later became a lecturer. In 1963, he was elected to Mirfield Urban District Council, representing the Labour Party, and from 1973 until 1978, he served on Kirklees Metropolitan Borough Council.

Megahy served as a Member of the European Parliament for the constituency of Yorkshire South West between 1979 and 1999. From 1985 until 1987, he was deputy leader of the British Labour Group, and from 1987 until 1989, he was a vice president of the Parliament.

Parliament of the United Kingdom
Preceded by Constituency created	Member of Parliament for Yorkshire South West; 1979 – 1999 election	Constituency abolished (see Yorkshire and the Humber)
