= Greater Manchester North (European Parliament constituency) =

Former European Parliament constituency

- European Parliament constituency
- Boundary within North West England (1979-1984)
- Member state: United Kingdom
- Created: 1979
- Dissolved: 1984
- MEPs: 1

Before its uniform adoption of proportional representation in 1999, the United Kingdom used first-past-the-post for the European elections in England, Scotland and Wales. The European Parliament constituencies used under that system were smaller than the later regional constituencies and only had one Member of the European Parliament each.

The constituency of Greater Manchester North was one of them.

It consisted of the Westminster Parliament constituencies of Ashton-under-Lyne, Bury and Radcliffe, Manchester Gorton, Middleton and Prestwich, Oldham East, Oldham West, Rochdale, and Stalybridge and Hyde.

== Members of the European Parliament ==
Election	Member	Party
1979	Barbara Castle	Labour

== Results ==
European Parliament election, 1979: Greater Manchester North
Party	Candidate	Votes	%	±%
Labour	Barbara Castle	79,920	50.2	
Conservative	C. C. Grantham	62,456	39.2	
Liberal	Michael Steed	16,910	10.6	
Majority		17,464	11.0	
Turnout		159,286	31.5	
Labour win (new seat)				
