= Harmar Nicholls =

British politician (1912–2000)

The Right Honourable The Lord Harmar-Nicholls
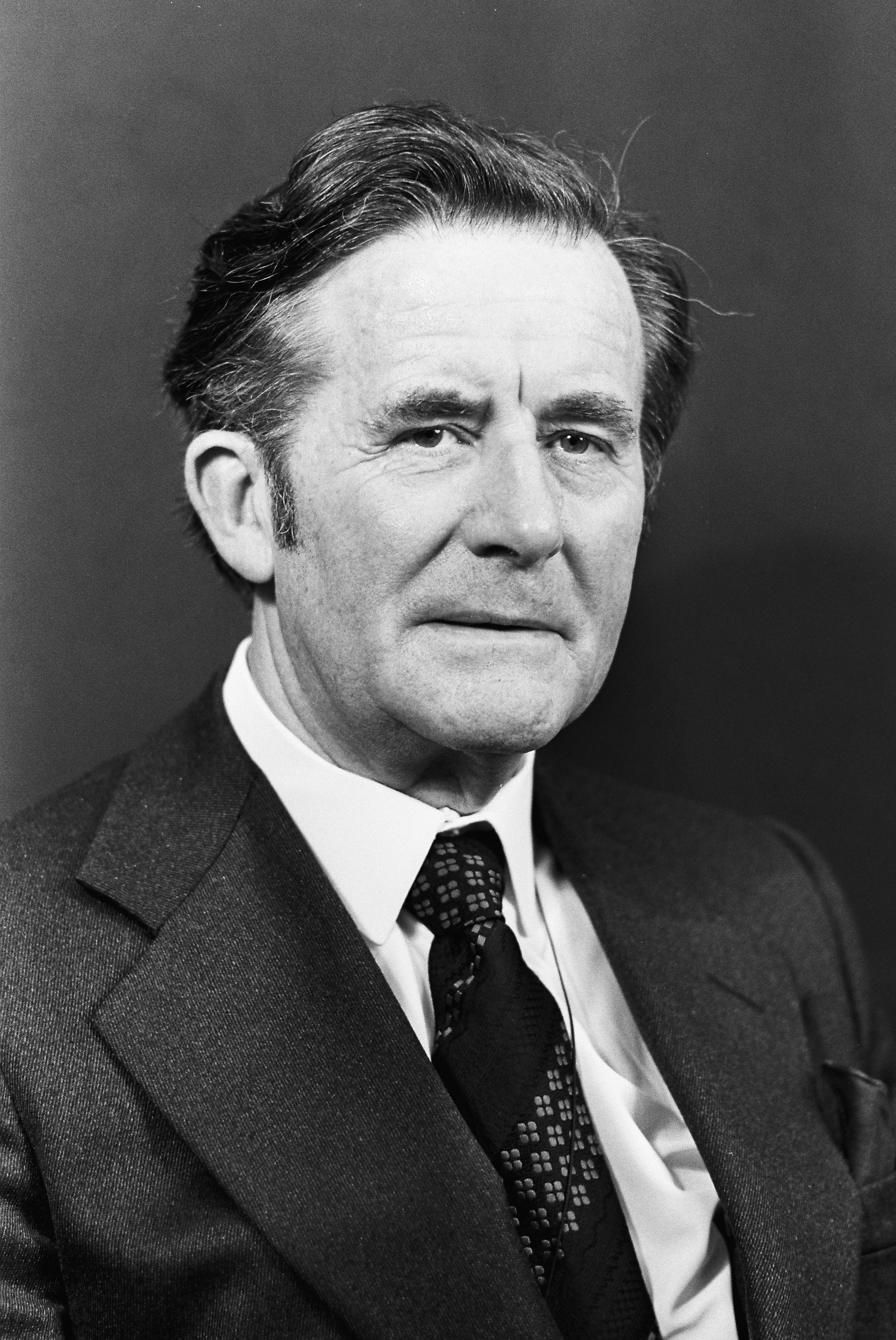
- Harmar-Nicholls in 1979

Member of Parliament for Peterborough
- In office 23 February 1950 – 20 September 1974
- Preceded by: Stanley Tiffany
- Succeeded by: Michael Ward

Member of the House of Lords
- Lord Temporal
- Life peerage 10 January 1975 – 15 September 2000

Personal details
- Born: Harmar Harmar-Nicholls; 1 November 1912 Walsall, Staffordshire, England
- Died: 15 September 2000 (aged 87)
- Party: Conservative
- Children: Sue Nicholls

Harmar Harmar-Nicholls, Baron Harmar-Nicholls (1 November 1912 – 15 September 2000), known as Sir Harmar Nicholls, 1st Baronet, from 1960 to 1975, was a British Conservative Party politician.

== Early life and career ==
Harmar Nicholls was born in Walsall, the son of Charles Edward Craddock Nicholls and Sarah Ann (née Wesley). He qualified as a barrister, called to the bar by Middle Temple. During World War II, he served in the Royal Engineers in India and Burma and fighting his first election as candidate for Nelson and Colne in 1945 before demobilisation, also contesting Preston in a 1946 by-election. He served as a councillor and chairman of Darlaston Urban District Council. He worked as a surveyor and as chairman of a paint company, serving as President of the Wallpaper and Paint Retailers' Association. He was a Lloyd's of London underwriter, a company director and chairman of Radio Luxembourg Ltd.

Nicholls was Member of Parliament for Peterborough from 1950 to 1974, when he lost in the October election of that year to Labour's Michael Ward, having held on by just 22 votes in the election eight months earlier. This was the second close call during his time as MP for Peterborough – in 1966, he held his seat by just three votes. Nicholls was Parliamentary Secretary to the Ministry of Agriculture, Fisheries and Food from 1955 to 1958, and to the Ministry of Works from 1958 to 1961. He was created a Baronet, of Darlaston in the County of Stafford, in 1960, and in 1975, after he lost his seat in the House of Commons, he was given a life peerage as Baron Harmar-Nicholls, of Peterborough in Cambridgeshire, changing his surname by deed poll to allow his forename to be incorporated into his title. From 1979 to 1984, he served as Member of the European Parliament for Greater Manchester South.

== Personal life ==
His daughter is the actress Sue Nicholls of Rentaghost and Coronation Street fame. He had no sons and the baronetcy became extinct on his death, aged 87, on 15 September 2000.

According to Alistair Cooke, Baron Lexden, a Conservative member of the House of Lords, Nicholls had an affair with the Russian spy John Vassall. The affair was discovered due to MI5 files being declassified in 2022.

== Arms ==
Coat of arms of Harmar Nicholls

Crest
Gules and Sable two keys in saltire wards upwards Argent supporting a Davey lamp Proper all tied about with a Stafford knot the strands Gules and Sable the tassels also Gules.
Escutcheon
Per pale and per chevron Gules and Sable two arrows with broad heads pilewise the shafts Argent the feathers and heads Or overall a chevron engrailed Gold.
Motto
Perseverantia Vincit

Parliament of the United Kingdom
Preceded by Stanley Tiffany	Member of Parliament for Peterborough; 1950 – Oct 1974	Succeeded by Michael Ward
Baronetage of the United Kingdom
New creation	Baronet (of Darlaston); 1960–2000	Extinct
