= Hereford and Worcester (European Parliament constituency) =

Former European Parliament constituency

- European Parliament constituency
- Boundary within the West Midlands (1979-1984)
- Member state: United Kingdom
- Created: 1979
- Dissolved: 1994
- MEPs: 1

Prior to its uniform adoption of proportional representation in 1999, the United Kingdom used first-past-the-post for the European elections in England, Scotland and Wales. The European Parliament constituencies used under that system were smaller than the later regional constituencies and only had one Member of the European Parliament each.

The constituency of Hereford and Worcester was one of them.

Boundary within the West Midlands (1984-1994)

== Boundaries ==
1979-1984: Bromsgrove and Redditch, Hereford, Kidderminster, Leominster, South Worcestershire, West Gloucestershire, Worcester.

1984-1994: Bromsgrove, Hereford, Leominster, Mid Worcestershire, South Worcestershire, West Gloucestershire, Worcester, Wyre Forest.

== MEPs ==
Elected	Member	Party
1979	James Scott-Hopkins	Conservative
1994	Constituency abolished	

== Election results ==
European Parliament election, 1979: Hereford and Worcester
Party	Candidate	Votes	%	±%
Conservative	James Scott-Hopkins	106,271	58.5	
Labour	R. H. J. Jones	49,888	27.5	
Liberal	R. G. Otter	25,421	14.0	
Majority		56,383	31.0	
Turnout		181,580	34.8	
Conservative win (new seat)				

European Parliament election, 1984: Hereford and Worcester
Party	Candidate	Votes	%	±%
Conservative	James Scott-Hopkins	84,077	48.3	−10.2
Labour	Peter E. S. Nielsen	44,143	25.3	−2.2
Liberal	I. D. (David) Phillips	37,854	21.7	+7.7
Ecology	Miss Felicity M. Norman	8,179	4.7	New
Majority		39,934	23.0	
Turnout		174,253	31.1	
Conservative hold		Swing		

European Parliament election, 1989: Hereford and Worcester
Party	Candidate	Votes	%	±%
Conservative	Sir James Scott-Hopkins	87,898	41.3	−7.0
Labour	Christopher A. Short	62,233	29.2	+3.9
Green	Miss Felicity M. Norman	49,296	23.1	+18.4'"`UNIQ−−ref−00000016−QINU`"'
SLD	Mrs. Joan D. Davies	13,569	6.4	−15.3
Majority		25,665	12.1	−10.9
Turnout		212,996	35.8	+4.7
Conservative hold		Swing		
