= Midlands East (European Parliament constituency) =

Former European Parliament constituency

- European Parliament constituency
- Boundary within the East Midlands (1979-1984)
- Member state: United Kingdom
- Created: 1979
- Dissolved: 1984
- MEPs: 1

Prior to its uniform adoption of proportional representation in 1999, the United Kingdom used first-past-the-post for the European elections in England, Scotland and Wales. The European Parliament constituencies used under that system were smaller than the later regional constituencies and only had one Member of the European Parliament each.

The constituency of Midlands East was one of them.

It consisted of the Westminster Parliament constituencies (under the terms of The Parliamentary Constituencies (England) Order 1970, which had taken effect at the February 1974 general election) of Blaby, Bosworth, Loughborough, Meriden, Nuneaton, and Rugby.

== Members of the European Parliament ==
Elected	Members	Party
1979	John Taylor	Conservative
1984	Constituency abolished	

== Results ==
European Parliament election, 1979: Midlands East
Party	Candidate	Votes	%	±%
Conservative	John Taylor	85,098	55.3	
Labour	T.R. O’Sullivan	53,935	35.1	
Liberal	Graham A. Gopsill	14,819	9.6	
Majority		31,163	20.2	
Turnout		153,852	32.3	
Conservative win (new seat)				
