= Somerset (European Parliament constituency) =

European Parliament constituency in England

- European Parliament constituency
- Boundary within South West England (1979-1984)
- Member state: United Kingdom
- Created: 1979
- Dissolved: 1984
- MEPs: 1

Somerset was a European Parliament constituency in England, covering all of Somerset and southern Avon.

Prior to its uniform adoption of proportional representation in 1999, the United Kingdom used first-past-the-post for the European elections in England, Scotland and Wales. The European Parliament constituencies used under that system were smaller than the later regional constituencies and only had one Member of the European Parliament each.

It consisted of the Westminster Parliament constituencies (on their 1974 boundaries) of Bath, Bridgwater, North Somerset, Taunton, Wells, Weston-super-Mare, and Yeovil.

The constituency was replaced by much of Somerset and West Dorset and part of Bristol in 1984. Following further changes, these seats became part of the much larger South West England constituency in 1999.

== Members of the European Parliament ==
| Elected | Name | Party |
|---|---|---|
| 1979 | Frederick Warner | Conservative |
| 1984 | Constituency abolished | |

== Results ==
European Parliament election, 1979: Somerset
| Party | Candidate | Votes | % | ±% |
|---|---|---|---|---|
| Conservative | Frederick Warner | 120,057 | 57.0 | |
| Liberal | Alan Butt Philip | 48,600 | 23.1 | |
| Labour | D. R. Lovelace | 41,931 | 19.9 | |
| Majority | | 71,457 | 33.9 | |
| Turnout | | 210,588 | 38.4 | |
| Conservative win (new seat) | | | | |
