= Multi-member constituencies in the Parliament of the United Kingdom =

Multi-member constituencies existed in the Parliament of the United Kingdom and its predecessor bodies in the component parts of the United Kingdom from the earliest era of elected representation until they were abolished by the Representation of the People Act 1948. Since the 1950 general election, all members of the House of Commons have been elected from single-member constituencies.

== Method of election ==
Three electoral systems were used to return members to Parliament in multi-member districts.

=== Bloc vote ===
The system requires two or more vacant seats for elections and is used for local elections in England and Wales. The original method and the one most commonly used is the following variety of bloc vote:

Electors vote for as many candidates as vacant seats in their geographic division of the election, or they may vote for fewer candidates. The elector cannot vote more than once for any candidate. A single vote for one of the candidates was known as a plumper, and was particularly valued by the candidate receiving it and would be sought or demanded when campaigning and offering hospitality especially from the most reliable supporters.

Example:

Instructions: vote for up to two candidates
Name of candidate	Party	Logo/colour
Adam Adams	Global concern centrist	
Benjamin Benn	Pro-union anti-poverty party	
Catherine Catheys	Free markets philanthropic party	
Deborah Debbison	Repay debt, cut-taxes party	
Lord Evan ap Evan	Repay debt, cut-taxes party	

At the close of polls an impartial officer declares the poll-leading candidates to be elected to the vacant seats. If there are two seats (as above), the candidate with the most votes is elected, as is the candidate with the second-most votes. It is clear from the above example that the last-listed party can in principle have both its candidates elected in this area. However, if that party is only strong enough at best for second-place in this area it should have run one "rally around" candidate.

==== Drawbacks ====
The system suffers from a drawback for a small minority of "ambitious electors" in an election. Say, a voter supports just one candidate but votes twice or more, but reluctantly, for these extra choices out of ignorance of the system or hatred for some other candidate(s). She estimates she has therefore done more to stop the 'threat' of the hated candidate(s) but she will have contributed to the defeat of her most preferred candidate by boosting the second preference, who may be the poll-topper or second-placer (if receiving strong local support), and local support has shifted or was to be expected to one of the hated or lower-order candidates who is also elected with the most or the second-most votes.

Having two-or-greater seats per constituency Allows more fair elections than single-winner but only if a fair voting system is used. Using a multi-member district and a system that allows a minority to group to take all the seats, producing results just as un-proportional as single-winner FPTP.

Without the use of ranked votes or some mechanism to allocate the seats in a multi-seat district fairly, a party may choose to run only one candidate in a two-seat district, thus preventing it from winning two seats even if it has wide popularity. It will have "shot itself in the foot" by not running two candidates. It has given away such extra seats.

In first-past-the-post it is often the marginal seats, where the candidate wins by a narrow margin, that determine the outcome even if in the safe seats a party takes the vast bulk of votes.

==== Formal and informal local pacts ====
Gentleman's agreements were frequently formed between one Whig and one Tory or Radical, agreeing to serve their respective factions, and instead of a costly campaign against each other an uncontested election would see both elected by the same electorate; particularly where they were the landed or business-owning patrons of that electorate. An advantage of this system, at least from the point of view of politicians, is that it enabled different sections of a party or allied groups to work together in the same constituency. In the early and mid-19th century it was quite common for liberals in an area with two seats to support the (left wing) liberal Radical candidate and the (right wing) liberal Whig nominee. Similarly in the early 20th century the Liberal Party and Labour Party found it expedient to pre-agree to field one candidate each in each such seat (unless a sure victory was anticipated for two like-party candidates); their main opponents being the Conservative Party in most areas.

==== Similarity to first-past-the-post ====
The operation is mathematically similar to the first-past-the-post method, likewise where separate local polls as opposed to one national poll takes place, it may lead to non-proportional outcomes to the disadvantage of losing factions by not amassing their votes to award consolation seats and the winners possibly disregarding them altogether. In both systems this can be rectified by awarding additional members (Mixed-member proportional representation), counting all the votes across the elected body using the D'Hondt method.

As well, similarly to First past the post, bloc voting often results in a party taking all the seats in a district although receiving just a minority of votes cast. A party with the most support will take all the seats if its supporters give all their votes to the party's slate. Such happened in Edmonton, Canada in 1921, when a party took all five of the seats in the district with just a third of the votes cast.

=== Limited vote ===
In 1868, the limited vote was introduced, which was similar to the bloc vote but restricted an individual elector in a three or four seat constituency to casting one fewer vote than the number of seats to be filled.

The purpose of this innovation was to encourage minority representation and weaken political parties. In some areas, particularly the three member counties where rural elites were used to negotiating so as to minimise the number of contested elections, the reform worked as its proposers hoped. In some urban areas, the result was completely counterproductive.

Joseph Chamberlain and the Birmingham Liberal Caucus realised that by ensuring their supporters voted in a disciplined manner, as directed by the Caucus, they had enough support to win all three seats for the city. Instead of weakening party organisation, the limited vote strengthened it. Instead of providing guaranteed minority representation, the chance of it depended largely on how well the dominant local party organised itself on those occasions when it had the proportion of votes needed to take a clean sweep.

When the Redistribution of Seats Act 1885 was being considered in 1884–85, the limited vote had little support. The Redistribution Act eliminated the three and four member districts, and the limited vote system disappeared. With only two seats at the most in a district, limited vote could only take the form of single non-transferable voting, which did not appeal.

=== Single transferable vote ===
When Parliament debated the Fourth Reform Act in 1918, consideration was given to electoral reform. James Lowther was Chairman of the Speakers' Electoral Reform Conference in 1916–1917, of the Boundary Commissions (Great Britain and Ireland) in 1917, of the Royal Commission on Proportional Representation in 1918, all held before the legislation was introduced. There had been a call for the introduction of proportional representation in multi-member seats (Single transferable vote), at least in major urban areas where constituencies would not have to cover very large areas. This was not a unanimous recommendation, and some politicians wished to introduce the alternative vote in single member seats.

The House of Lords and House of Commons were agreed that there should be some reform, but could not agree what. In the end, Speaker Lowther warned that if the dispute continued the whole bill would be lost. As a result of this, neither alternative voting or single transferable voting (STV) were introduced for territorial constituencies, which continued to use the old electoral systems (either first past the post plurality or bloc voting).

However one part of the proportional representation scheme survived into the final Act of Parliament. The multi-member University constituencies would elect their representatives using STV.

As only one constituency had as many as three seats and the others only two, the trial of STV was not very satisfactory, but it did loosen the traditional Conservative Party grip on most of the university seats and encouraged the election of Independents.

The university representation and multimember ridings were abolished in 1950 (1920 in the case of Dublin University). No members have been elected since then using a proportional representation system.

== Constituencies ==
Constituencies in the Parliament of England were enfranchised (or re-enfranchised in some cases centuries after they last returned members) according to the policy or whim of particular monarchs. By the start of the English Civil War only three of the English constituencies in the Unreformed House of Commons had not yet been enfranchised.

Under the Instrument of Government England (and Wales), Scotland and Ireland were all represented in the First Protectorate Parliament and Second Protectorate Parliament, using a novel scheme of constituencies represented by 1-13 members. The Third Protectorate Parliament reverted to the pre-war distribution (at least for the English members).

By 1660 England, Scotland and Ireland had all reverted to having individual Parliaments.

In the 1670s the last three English constituencies were enfranchised (one two member county and two two member boroughs). For the summary of the final composition of the Parliament of England see the English and Welsh parts of the tables below for 1708–1800 and 1801–1821.

In 1707 45 Scottish members were added to the existing Parliament of England, to form the Parliament of Great Britain. In the 1st Parliament of Great Britain the Scottish members were co-opted from the former Parliament of Scotland, but from 1708 the distribution of members was as set out in the Scottish section of the tables below. Notably all the Scottish seats before 1832 were single member constituencies.

In 1801 100 Irish members were added to the existing Parliament of Great Britain, to form the Parliament of the United Kingdom. In the First Parliament of the United Kingdom some of the Irish members (for constituencies reduced from two seats to one) were co-opted from the former Parliament of Ireland by drawing lots. For the counties and two boroughs (Cork and Dublin) which retained two seats both members continued after the Union.

=== Members of Parliament 1654-1658 ===
Key to categories: BC - Borough/Burgh constituencies, CC - County constituencies, UC - University constituencies, EC - English constituencies, WC - Welsh constituencies, SC - Scottish constituencies, IC - Irish constituencies, EMP - English Members of Parliament, WMP - Welsh Members of Parliament, SMP - Scottish Members of Parliament, IMP - Irish Members of Parliament, Total MP - Total Members of Parliament.

Table 1: Constituencies by type

Type	EC	WC	SC	IC	Total C	EMP	WMP	SMP	IMP	Total MP
BC	104	2	9	6	121	131	2	10	6	149
CC	44	12	20	13	89	242	23	20	24	309
UC	2	0	0	0	2	2	0	0	0	2
Total	150	14	29	19	212	375	25	30	30	460

Table 2: Constituencies, by number of seats

Type	x1	x2	x3	x4	x5	x6	x8	x9	x10	x11	x13	Total C	Total MP
BC	97	23	0	0	0	1	0	0	0	0	0	121	149
CC	23	28	4	12	7	4	2	1	4	3	1	89	309
UC	2	0	0	0	0	0	0	0	0	0	0	2	2
Total	122	51	4	12	7	5	2	1	4	3	1	212	460

Notes: (1) Monmouthshire (3 county seats) included in England, not Wales. (2) Dublin City and County treated as a county constituency (2 seats).

=== Members of Parliament 1708-1800 ===
Key to categories in the following tables: BC - Borough/Burgh constituencies, CC - County constituencies, UC - University constituencies, Total C - Total constituencies, BMP - Borough/Burgh Members of Parliament, CMP - County Members of Parliament, UMP - University Members of Parliament.

Table 1: Constituencies and MPs, by type and country

Country	BC	CC	UC	Total C	BMP	CMP	UMP	Total MPs
England	202	39	2	243	404	78	4	486
Wales	13	13	0	26	13	14	0	27
Scotland	15	30	0	45	15	30	0	45
Total	230	82	2	314	432	122	4	558

Table 2: Number of seats per constituency, by type and country

Country	BCx1	BCx2	BCx4	CCx1	CCx2	UCx2	Total C
England	4	196	2	0	39	0	243
Wales	13	0	0	12	1	0	26
Scotland	15	0	0	30	0	0	45
Total	32	196	2	42	40	2	314

=== Members of Parliament 1801-1821 ===
Key to categories in the following tables: BC - Borough/Burgh constituencies, CC - County constituencies, UC - University constituencies, Total C - Total constituencies, BMP - Borough/Burgh Members of Parliament, CMP - County Members of Parliament, UMP - University Members of Parliament.

Monmouthshire (1 County constituency with 2 MPs and one single member Borough constituency) is included in Wales in these tables. Sources for this period may include the county in England.

Table 1: Constituencies and MPs, by type and country

Country	BC	CC	UC	Total C	BMP	CMP	UMP	Total MPs
England	202	39	2	243	404	78	4	486
Wales	13	13	0	26	13	14	0	27
Scotland	15	30	0	45	15	30	0	45
Ireland	33	32	1	66	35	64	1	100
Total	263	114	3	380	467	176	5	658

Table 2: Number of seats per constituency, by type and country

Country	BCx1	BCx2	BCx4	CCx1	CCx2	UCx1	UCx2	Total C
England	4	196	2	0	39	0	2	243
Wales	13	0	0	12	1	0	0	26
Scotland	15	0	0	30	0	0	0	45
Ireland	31	2	0	0	32	1	0	66
Total	63	198	2	42	72	1	2	380

== List of multi-member constituencies ==
See List of multi-member constituencies in the United Kingdom and predecessor Parliaments

== See also ==
- List of former United Kingdom Parliament constituencies
