= Greater Manchester South (European Parliament constituency) =

Former European Parliament constituency

- European Parliament constituency
- Boundary within North West England (1979-1984)
- Member state: United Kingdom
- Created: 1979
- Dissolved: 1984
- MEPs: 1

Prior to its uniform adoption of proportional representation in 1999, the United Kingdom used first-past-the-post for the European elections in England, Scotland and Wales. The European Parliament constituencies used under that system were smaller than the later regional constituencies and only had one Member of the European Parliament each.

The constituency of Greater Manchester South was one of them.

It consisted of the Westminster Parliament constituencies of Cheadle, Manchester Ardwick, Manchester Blackley, Manchester Central, Manchester Moss Side, Manchester Openshaw, Manchester Withington, Manchester Wythenshawe, Stockport North, and Stockport South.

== Members of the European Parliament ==
Elected	Member	Party
1979	Lord Harmar-Nicholls	Conservative

== Results ==
European Parliament election, 1979: Greater Manchester South
Party	Candidate	Votes	%	±%
Conservative	Lord Harmar-Nicholls	70,688	47.5	
Labour	John A.D. Mills	63,214	42.5	
Liberal	J.B. Doherty	14,869	10.0	
Majority		7,474	5.0	
Turnout		148,771	29.8	
Conservative win (new seat)				
