= 1979 European Parliament election in the United Kingdom =

- 7 June 1979

81 seats to the European Parliament
- Turnout: 32.4%
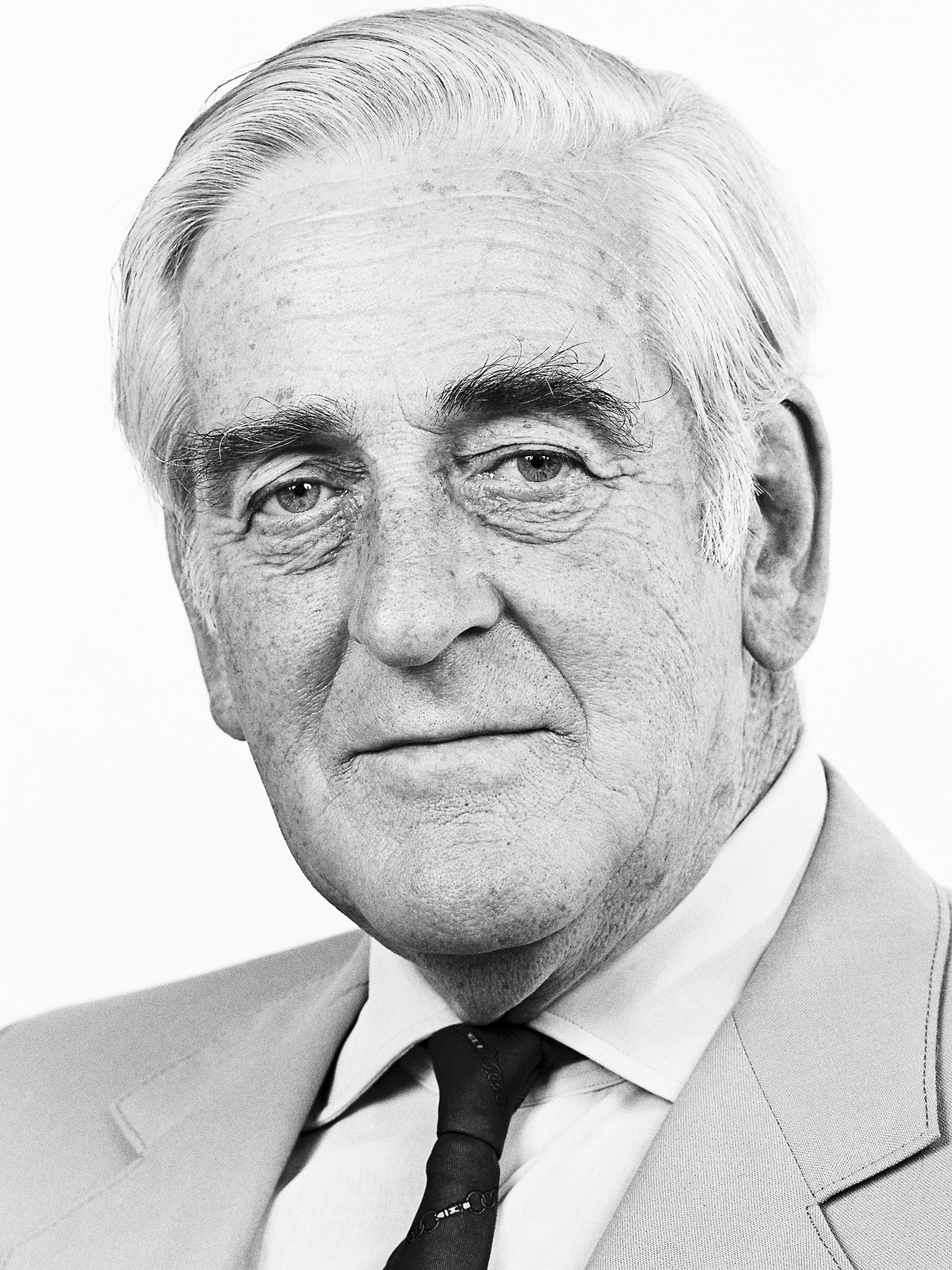

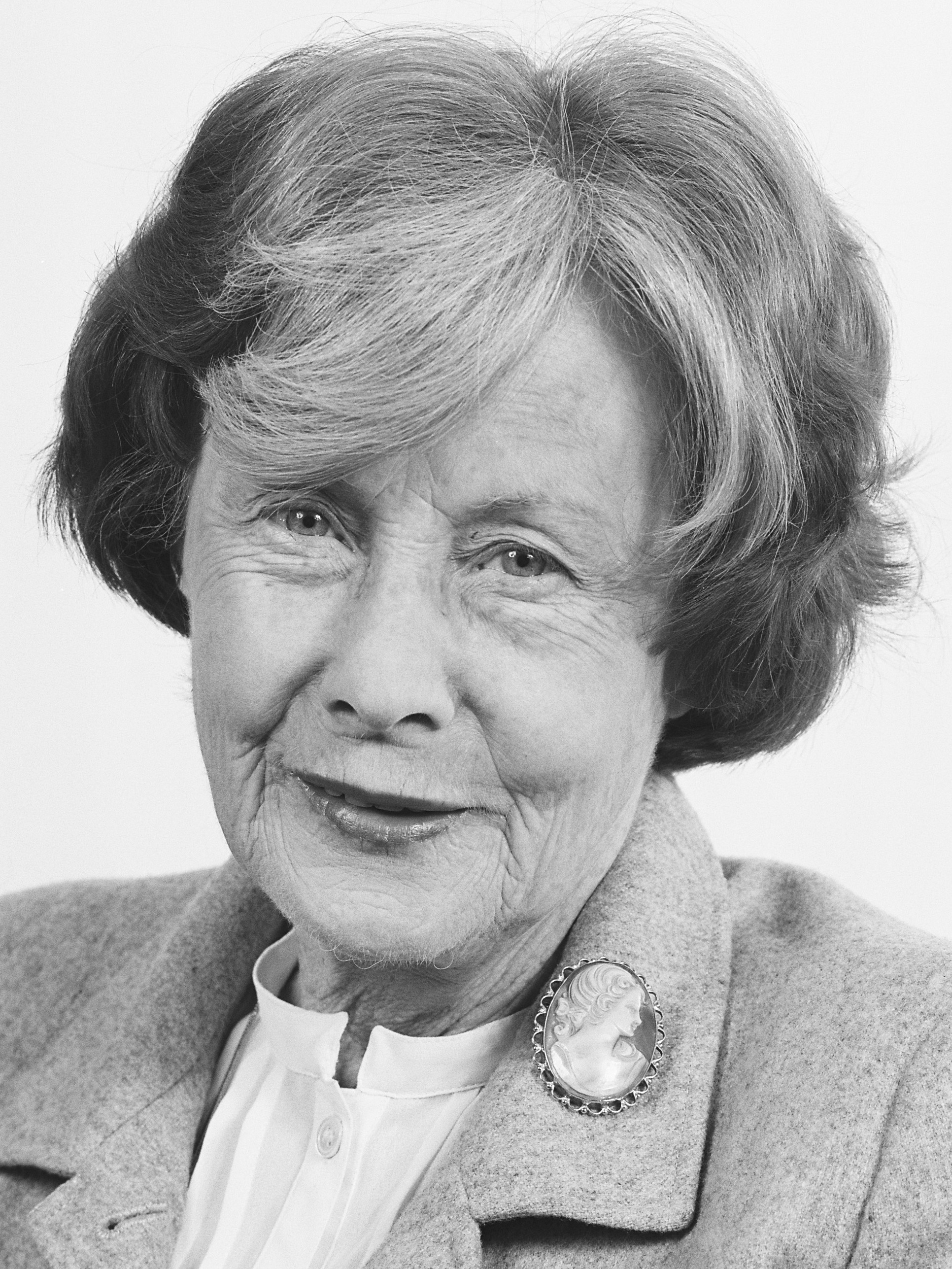
	First party	Second party
Leader	James Scott-Hopkins	Barbara Castle
Party	Conservative	Labour
Alliance	ED	PES
Leader's seat	Hereford and Worcester	Greater Manchester North
Seats won	60	17
Popular vote	6,508,492	4,253,247
Percentage	48.4%	31.6%

The 1979 European Parliament election, was the first European election to be held in the United Kingdom after the European Communities (EC) decided to directly elect representatives to the European Parliament. It was held on 7 June. Elections were also held in eight other EC states. European elections were incorporated into UK law by the European Assembly Elections Act 1978. Out of the 410 members of the European Parliament, 81 were elected from the UK. The electoral system was First past the post in England, Scotland and Wales (electing 78 MEPs in total) and Single Transferable Vote in Northern Ireland (electing 3 MEPs).

The result was a landslide victory for the Conservative Party, which won 60 of the 78 seats available in England, Wales and Scotland. Their decisive victory in the general election of the previous month and divisions within the Labour party on whether to stay in the EC probably helped the Conservatives to such a comprehensive victory. There was a very low turnout in the election compared with other states, the lowest in Europe. Voter apathy was an explanation, but it is likely the large number of elections in 1979 had a significant negative effect on turnout. There were referendums in Scotland and Wales on devolution in March and the general election in May, as well as local elections in England (not including London) and Wales.

== Result (UK-wide) ==
Party	Votes won	% of vote	Seats	% of seats
Conservative	6,508,492	48.4	60	75.0
Labour	4,253,247	31.6	17	21.3
Liberal	1,690,638	12.6	0	Steady
SNP	247,836	1.8	1	1.3
DUP	170,688	1.3	1	1.3
SDLP	140,622	1.0	1	1.3
UUP	125,169	0.9	1	1.3
Plaid Cymru	83,399	0.6	0	Steady
Alliance	39,026	0.3	0	Steady
Ind. Unionist	38,198	0.3	0	Steady
Ind. Republican	33,969	0.3	0	Steady
United Against the Common Market	27,506	0.2	0	Steady
Independent	23,539	0.2	0	Steady
Ecology	17,953	0.1	0	Steady
Mebyon Kernow	10,205	0.1	0	Steady
United Community	9,383	0.1	0	Steady
United Labour	6,122	0.0	0	Steady
Ind. Conservative	4,804	0.0	0	Steady
Workers' Party	4,418	0.0	0	Steady
Unionist Party NI	3,712	0.0	0	Steady
Independent Democratic	2,473	0.0	0	Steady
International Marxist	1,635	0.0	0	Steady
Ulster Liberal Party	932	0.0	0	Steady
EFP	497	0.0	0	Steady
Others	1,628	0.0	0	Steady

- Overall (England, Scotland, Wales and Northern Ireland) turnout: 32.4%
- Overall votes cast: 13,460,091

== Results Breakdown ==
=== England, Scotland and Wales ===
Map of the Scottish results.

Map of the Northern Irish results

Source: UK Parliament Briefing

Party	Votes won	% of vote	Seats	% of seats
Conservative	6,508,492	50.6	60	76.9
Labour	4,253,247	33.0	17	21.8
Liberal	1,690,638	13.1	0	Steady
SNP	247,836	1.9	1	1.3
Plaid Cymru	83,399	0.6	0	Steady
United Against the Common Market	27,506	0.2	0	Steady
Independent	23,539	0.2	0	Steady
Ecology	17,953	0.1	0	Steady
Mebyon Kernow	10,205	0.1	0	Steady
Ind. Conservative	4,804	0.0	0	Steady
Ind. Democratic	2,473	0.0	0	Steady
International Marxist	1,635	0.0	0	Steady
EFP	497	0.0	0	Steady
Others	1,628	0.0	0	Steady

Total votes cast – 12,873,852.

=== Northern Ireland ===
Source Northern Ireland Social and Political Archive

Party	Candidate(s)	Seats	First Preference Votes	
Party	Candidate(s)	Seats	Number	% of vote
DUP	Ian Paisley	1	170,688	29.8
SDLP	John Hume	1	140,622	25.5
UUP	John Taylor, Harry West	1	125,169	21.9
Alliance	Oliver Napier	0	39,026	6.8
Ind. Unionist	James Kilfedder	0	38,198	6.7
Ind. Republican	Bernadette McAliskey	0	33,969	5.9
United Community	David Bleakley	0	9,383	1.6
United Labour	Paddy Devlin	0	6,122	1.1
Workers' Party	Brian Brennan, Francis Donnelly	0	4,418	0.8
Unionist Party NI	Eddie Cummings	0	3,712	0.6
Ulster Liberal	James Murray	0	932	0.2

Total votes cast – 572,239.

== Constituency results ==
Constituency	Con	%	Lab	%	Lib	%	PC	%	SNP	%	Others	
Bedfordshire	102,054	58.8	48,454	27.9	21,943	12.6					1,198	0.7
Birmingham North	68,507	47.8	60,163	42.0	14,583	10.2						
Birmingham South	66,012	47.5	60,775	43.7	12,160	8.8						
Bristol	100,160	54.2	59,443	32.1	25,308	13.7						
Cambridgeshire	94,497	59.0	42,038	26.3	23,501	14.7						
Cheshire East	89,640	56.0	50,324	31.5	19,952	12.5						
Cheshire West	93,589	56.8	47,276	28.7	23,816	14.5						
Cleveland	76,514	50.6	51,688	34.1	18,125	12.0					4,960	3.3
Cornwall and Plymouth	94,650	55.1	36,681	21.4	23,105	13.5					17,164	10.0
Cotswolds	109,139	58.6	37,713	20.3	27,916	15.0					11,422	6.1
Cumbria	104,471	56.4	62,485	33.7	16,631	9.0					1,596	0.9
Derbyshire	81,046	50.9	62,347	39.2	15,775	9.9						
Devon	127,032	61.8	37,380	18.2	41,010	20.0						
Durham	53,043	35.1	81,982	54.2	16,094	10.7						
Essex North East	99,137	60.7	33,496	20.5	26,298	16.1					4,497	2.7
Essex South West	78,059	53.9	46,244	31.9	20,516	14.2						
Glasgow	41,144	27.3	73,846	49.0	11,073	7.3			24,776	16.4		
Greater Manchester North	62,456	39.2	79,920	50.2	16,910	10.6						
Greater Manchester South	70,688	47.5	63,214	42.5	14,869	10.0						
Greater Manchester West	67,127	43.3	66,825	43.1	21,021	13.6						
Hampshire West	114,978	58.9	34,472	17.7	45,786	23.4						
Hereford and Worcester	106,271	58.5	49,888	27.5	25,421	14.0						
Hertfordshire	97,174	50.2	49,619	25.6	46,757	24.2						
Highlands and Islands	30,776	26.1	10,846	9.2	36,109	30.7			39,991	34.0		
Humberside	79,531	51.7	56,521	36.8	17,643	11.5						
Kent East	117,267	64.7	40,060	22.1	20,190	11.1					3,788	2.1
Kent West	113,961	60.7	46,482	24.8	27,127	13.5						
Lancashire Central	91,355	54.1	63,709	37.7	13,821	8.2						
Lancashire East	77,087	49.9	62,729	40.6	12,268	7.9					2,473	1.6
Lancashire West	79,888	51.3	60,399	38.7	12,116	7.8					3,486	2.2
Leeds	54,405	39.8	62,475	45.6	20,005	14.6						
Leicester	91,675	55.1	57,811	34.7	17,027	10.2						
Lincolnshire	104,460	61.5	44,616	26.3	20,815	12.2						
Liverpool	49,646	45.2	42,419	38.7	17,650	16.1						
London Central	84,915	54.4	45,721	29.3	19,010	12.2					6,448	4.1
London East	77,955	48.8	64,925	40.7	16,783	10.5						
London North	74,042	49.7	59,077	39.7	15,838	10.6						
London North East	36,200	34.2	61,004	57.5	8,839	8.3						
London North West	87,596	55.3	49,268	31.1	21,618	13.6						
London South	98,298	58.9	44,967	27.0	23,526	14.1						
London South East	94,180	55.0	54,798	32.0	21,494	12.5					890	0.5
London South Inner	60,652	43.6	67,830	48.8	10,509	7.6						
London South West	83,498	52.0	51,742	32.2	21,251	13.2					3,810	2.6
London West	89,433	51.0	67,193	38.3	17,077	9.8					1,635	0.9
Lothians	66,761	35.6	61,180	32.6	29,518	15.8			29,935	16.0		
Mid and West Wales	67,226	36.0	77,474	41.4	17,628	9.4	22,730	12.2			1,826	1.0
Mid Scotland and Fife	66,255	35.1	58,768	31.2	18,112	9.6			45,426	24.1		
Midlands Central	94,606	57.9	46,557	28.5	15,859	9.7					6,380	3.9
Midlands East	85,098	55.3	53,935	35.1	14,819	9.6						
Midlands West	69,916	47.3	68,024	46.0	9,936	6.7						
Norfolk	102,981	59.8	52,406	30.4	16,805	9.8						
North East Scotland	51,930	33.0	38,139	24.2	38,516	24.5			28,886	18.3		
North Wales	74,173	41.9	46,627	26.4	21,989	12.4	34,171	19.3				
Northamptonshire	103,638	59.6	47,029	27.1	23,134	13.3						
Northumbria	67,066	39.9	75,172	44.8	25,713	15.3						
Nottingham	64,728	44.8	66,279	45.9	13,515	9.3						
Salop and Stafford	90,545	57.5	45,547	28.9	16,469	10.5					4,804	3.1
Sheffield	64,157	42.1	77,219	50.7	10,951	7.2						
Somerset	120,057	57.0	41,931	19.9	48,600	23.1						
South East Wales	51,478	30.3	93,093	54.8	10,534	6.2	12,469	7.4			2,182	1.3
South of Scotland	66,816	43.0	43,145	27.7	16,825	10.8			28,694	18.5		
South Wales	66,852	37.9	77,784	44.1	17,811	10.1	14,029	7.9				
Staffordshire East	70,836	48.7	64,230	44.1	10,409	7.2						
Strathclyde East	41,482	28.6	72,263	49.8	10,325	7.1			21,013	14.5		
Strathclyde West	65,608	37.2	63,781	36.1	17,955	10.2			29,115	16.5		
Suffolk	101,966	60.4	45,642	27.1	21,131	12.5						
Surrey	113,786	54.4	28,897	13.8	62,272	29.7					4,450	2.1
Sussex East	123,506	65.7	33,581	17.9	30,847	16.4						
Sussex West	131,077	65.9	26,894	13.5	35,593	17.9					5,303	2.7
Thames Valley	110,788	63.1	39,865	22.7	24,877	14.2						
Tyne South and Wear	67,475	44.9	73,936	49.2	8,958	5.9						
Upper Thames	103,488	59.4	39,900	22.9	30,907	17.7						
Wessex	130,744	63.3	42,910	20.8	31,220	15.1					1,706	0.8
Wight and Hampshire East	128,414	64.7	34,901	17.6	35,248	17.7						
Wiltshire	86,873	47.5	35,457	19.4	60,404	33.1						
Yorkshire North	98,464	59.1	41,408	24.8	26,812	16.1						
Yorkshire South	46,656	32.6	83,490	58.3	13,025	9.1						
Yorkshire South West	52,157	35.8	75,473	51.9	17,850	12.3						
Yorkshire West	73,555	44.4	76,552	46.3	15,460	9.3						

== See also ==
- Elections in the United Kingdom#European Parliament elections
- List of members of the European Parliament for the United Kingdom (1979–1984)
