= James Scott-Hopkins =

British politician

Sir James Scott-Hopkins
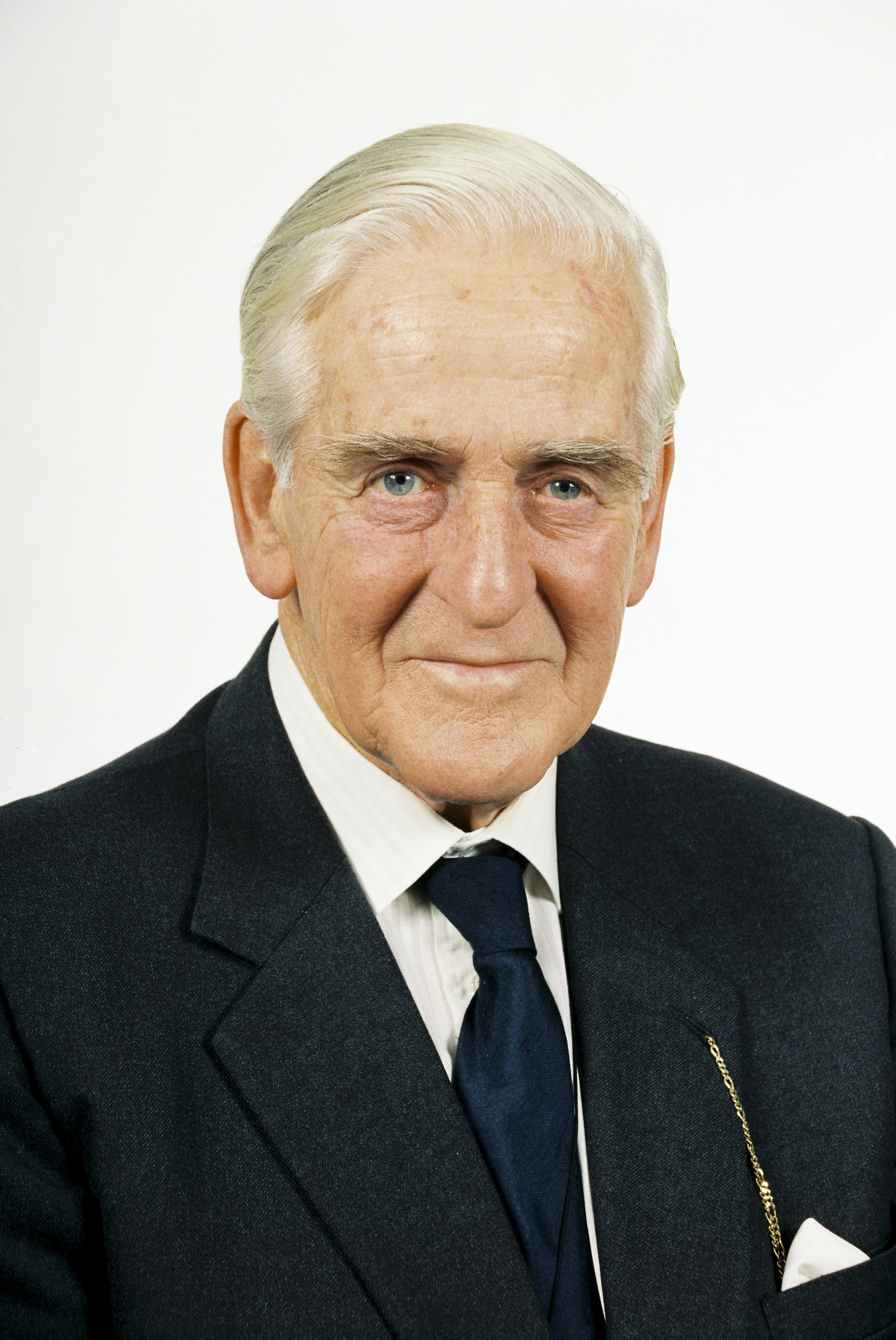
- Official MEP portrait of Scott-Hopkins

Leader of the Conservatives in the European Parliament
- In office 7 July 1979 – 9 February 1982
- Preceded by: Geoffrey Rippon
- Succeeded by: Henry Plumb

Member of the European Parliament for Hereford and Worcester
- In office 7 June 1979 – 9 June 1994
- Preceded by: Position established
- Succeeded by: Position abolished

Member of Parliament for West Derbyshire
- In office 23 November 1967 – 7 April 1979
- Preceded by: Aidan Crawley
- Succeeded by: Matthew Parris

Member of Parliament for North Cornwall
- In office 8 October 1959 – 10 March 1966
- Preceded by: Sir Harold Roper
- Succeeded by: John Pardoe

Personal details
- Born: 29 November 1921 Croydon, Surrey, England
- Died: 11 March 1995 (aged 73) Westminster, London, England
- Party: Conservative
- Spouse: Geraldine Hargreaves (m. 1946)
- Children: 4
- Education: Eton College
- Alma mater: New College, Oxford; Emmanuel College, Cambridge

Military service
- Allegiance: United Kingdom
- Branch/service: British Army
- Years of service: 1939–1950
- Battles/wars: World War II

Sir James Sidney Rawdon Scott-Hopkins (29 November 1921 – 11 March 1995) was a British Conservative politician.

Born in Croydon, Scott-Hopkins was educated at Eton College, New College, Oxford and Emmanuel College, Cambridge. He joined the British Army in 1939. He was commissioned in the 3rd QAO Gurkha Rifles in 1942 and served on the North-West Frontier, commanding C Company of the 4th Battalion, and in Burma until 1946, having taken a regular commission in the King's Own Yorkshire Light Infantry in 1944. He retired from the Army in 1950 and became a farmer. He married Geraldine Hargreaves in Eton in 1946 (three sons, one daughter); she died in 2023.

Scott-Hopkins contested Bedwellty in 1955. He was Member of Parliament (MP) for North Cornwall from 1959 until he lost the seat to the Liberal John Pardoe in 1966. He had served as joint Parliamentary Secretary at MAFF 1962–64. He was re-elected as MP for West Derbyshire at a 1967 by-election, and served until 1979.

His successor was Matthew Parris. He had served, concurrently (to 1979), as a Member of the European Parliament (MEP) from 1979, when he was elected for the Hereford and Worcester European constituency, serving until 1994. He was knighted in the 1981 New Year Honours "for political and public service." He died in Westminster, aged 73.

Parliament of the United Kingdom
Preceded by Sir Harold Roper	Member of Parliament for North Cornwall; 1959–1966	Succeeded by John Pardoe
Preceded by Aidan Crawley	Member of Parliament for West Derbyshire; 1967–1979	Succeeded by Matthew Parris
European Parliament
New constituency	Member of the European Parliament for Hereford and Worcester; 1979–1994	Constituency abolished
Party political offices
Preceded by Geoffrey Rippon	Leader of the Conservatives in the European Parliament; 1979–1982	Succeeded by Henry Plumb
