= Birmingham South (European Parliament constituency) =

Former European Parliament constituency

- European Parliament constituency
- Boundary within the West Midlands (1979-1984)
- Member state: United Kingdom
- Created: 1979
- Dissolved: 1984
- MEPs: 1

Prior to its uniform adoption of proportional representation in 1999, the United Kingdom used first-past-the-post for the European elections in England, Scotland and Wales. The European Parliament constituencies used under that system were smaller than the later regional constituencies and only had one Member of the European Parliament each.

The constituency of Birmingham South was one of them.

It consisted of the Westminster Parliament constituencies of Birmingham Edgbaston, Birmingham Hall Green, Birmingham Handsworth, Birmingham Ladywood, Birmingham Northfield, Birmingham Selly Oak, Birmingham Small Heath, Birmingham Sparkbrook, and Birmingham Yardley.

== Member of the European Parliament ==
Elected	Name	Party
1979	Norvela Forster	Conservative

== Results ==
European Parliament election, 1979: Birmingham South
Party	Candidate	Votes	%	±%
Conservative	Norvela Forster	66,012	47.5	
Labour	Albert Bore	60,775	43.7	
Liberal	Anthony J. Batchelor	12,160	8.8	
Majority		5,237	3.8	
Turnout		138,947	27.3	
Conservative win (new seat)				
