= Democratic Unionist Party representation and election results =

UK political party election results

This article lists the election results and representation of the Democratic Unionist Party with respect to the House of Commons of the United Kingdom,

== House of Commons ==
Map showing seat results for Northern Ireland Westminster elections 1997–2019

Election year	# of total votes	% of overall vote	# of seats won (NI)	Outcome
Feb 1974	58,656 ▲	0.2% ▲	1 / 12	Opposition
Oct 1974	59,451 ▲	0.3% ▲	1 / 12	Opposition
1979	70,795 ▲	0.2% ▲	3 / 12 ▲	Opposition
1983	152,749 ▲	0.5% ▲	3 / 17	Opposition
1987	85,642 ▼	0.3% ▼	3 / 17	Opposition
1992	103,039 ▲	0.3% ▲	3 / 17	Opposition
1997	107,348 ▲	0.3% ▲	2 / 18 ▼	Opposition
2001	181,999 ▲	0.7% ▲	5 / 18 ▲	Opposition
2005	241,856 ▲	0.9% ▲	9 / 18 ▲	Opposition
2010	168,216 ▼	0.6% ▼	8 / 18 ▼	Opposition
2015	184,260 ▲	0.6% ▲	8 / 18	Opposition
2017	292,316 ▲	0.9% ▲	10 / 18 ▲	Confidence and supply (Con minority gov't)
2019	244,127 ▼	0.8% ▼	8 / 18 ▼	Opposition
2024	172,058 ▼		5 / 18 ▼	Opposition

== Northern Ireland Assembly election results ==
Election	Northern Ireland Assembly	Total votes	Share of votes	Seats	+/-	Government
1973	1973 Assembly	78,228	10.8%	8 / 78	▲8	Opposition
1975	Constitutional Convention	97,073	14.8%	12 / 78	▲4	Fourth largest party
1982	1982 Assembly	145,528	23.0%	21 / 78	▲9	Opposition
1996	Forum	141,413	18.8%	24 / 110	▲24	Second largest party
1998	1st Assembly	145,917	18.5%	20 / 108	▼4	Junior party in coalition
2003	2nd Assembly	177,944	25.7%	30 / 108	▲10	Largest party, direct rule
2007	3rd Assembly	207,721	30.1%	36 / 108	▲6	Coalition
2011	4th Assembly	198,436	30.0%	38 / 108	▲2	Coalition
2016	5th Assembly	202,567	29.2%	38 / 108	Steady	Coalition
2017	6th Assembly	225,413	28.1%	28 / 90	▼10	Coalition
2022	7th Assembly	184,002	21.33%	25 / 90	▼3	TBD

== European Parliament election results ==
Election	European Parliament	First-preference votes	Share of first-preference votes	Seats (NI)	+/-	Alliance
1979	First Parliament	230,251	33.6%	1 / 3	n/a	Non-Inscrits
1984	Second Parliament	170,688	29.8%	1 / 3	Steady	Non-Inscrits
1989	Third Parliament	160,110	29.9%	1 / 3	Steady	Non-Inscrits
1994	Fourth Parliament	163,246	29.2%	1 / 3	Steady	Non-Inscrits
1999	Fifth Parliament	192,762	28.4%	1 / 3	Steady	Non-Inscrits
2004	Sixth Parliament	175,761	32.0%	1 / 3	Steady	Non-Inscrits
2009	Seventh Parliament	88,346	18.2%	1 / 3	Steady	Non-Inscrits
2014	Eighth Parliament	131,163	20.9%	1 / 3	Steady	Non-Inscrits
2019	Ninth Parliament	124,991	21.8%	1 / 3	Steady	Non-Inscrits
