= Cheshire East (European Parliament constituency) =

Former European Parliament constituency

- European Parliament constituency
- Boundary within North West England (1979-1984)
- Member state: United Kingdom
- Created: 1979
- Dissolved: 1999
- MEPs: 1

Prior to its uniform adoption of proportional representation in 1999, the United Kingdom used first-past-the-post for the European elections in England, Scotland and Wales. The European Parliament constituencies used under that system were smaller than the later regional constituencies and only had one Member of the European Parliament each.

The constituency of Cheshire East was one of them.

From 1979 to 1984, it consisted of the Westminster Parliament constituencies of Crewe, Hazel Grove, Knutsford, Macclesfield, Newton, Runcorn, and Warrington.

From 1984 to 1994, it consisted of Congleton, Crewe and Nantwich, Macclesfield, Staffordshire Moorlands, Tatton, Warrington North, and Warrington South.

From 1994 to 1999, it consisted of Altrincham and Sale, Halton, Macclesfield, Manchester Wythenshawe, Tatton, Warrington North, and Warrington South.

Boundary within North West England (1984-1994)

Boundary within North West England (1994-1999)

== MEPs ==
Election	Member	Party
Cambridgeshire and Bedfordshire prior to 1984
1979	Tom Normanton	Conservative
1989	Brian Simpson	Labour
1999	Constituency abolished, see North West England	

== Election results ==
European Parliament election, 1979: Cheshire East
Party	Candidate	Votes	%	±%
Conservative	Tom Normanton	89,640	56.0	
Labour	D. W. (William) Davies	50,324	31.5	
Liberal	Vivian N. Bingham	19,952	12.5	
Majority		39,316	24.5	
Turnout		159,916	31.7	
Conservative win (new seat)				

European Parliament election, 1984: Cheshire East
Party	Candidate	Votes	%	±%
Conservative	Tom Normanton	71,182	45.8	−10.2
Labour	Alan Stephenson	52,806	34.0	+2.5
SDP	James P. Corbett	31,374	20.2	+8.7
Majority		18,376	11.8	−12.7
Turnout		155,362	31.2	
Conservative hold		Swing		

European Parliament election, 1989: Cheshire East
Party	Candidate	Votes	%	±%
Labour	Brian Simpson	74,721	41.2	+7.2
Conservative	Sir Tom Normanton	72,857	40.2	−5.6
Green	Chris C. White	21,456	11.8	New
SLD	Mrs. Beatrice L. Fraenkel	12,344	6.8	−13.4
Majority		1,864	1.0	N/A
Turnout		181,378	35.0	+3.8
Labour gain from Conservative		Swing		

European Parliament election, 1994: Cheshire East
Party	Candidate	Votes	%	±%
Labour	Brian Simpson	87,586	53.7	+12.5
Conservative	Peter Slater	48,307	29.6	−10.6
Liberal Democrats	C. P. (Phillip) Harris	20,552	12.6	+5.8
Green	David T. Wild	3,671	2.2	−9.6
Monster Raving Loony	Peter A. Dixon	1,600	1.0	New
Natural Law	Peter D. N. Leadbetter	1,488	0.9	New
Majority		39,279	24.1	+23.1
Turnout		163,204	32.5	−2.5
Labour hold		Swing		
