= List of members of the European Parliament for the United Kingdom (1984–1989) =

This is a list of the members of the European Parliament for the United Kingdom in the 1984 to 1989 session.

== List ==
Name	National party	EP Group	Constituency
Gordon Adam	Labour Party	SOC	Northumbria
Richard Balfe	Labour Party	SOC	London South Inner
Robert Battersby	Conservative Party	ED	Humberside
Christopher Beazley	Conservative Party	ED	Cornwall & Plymouth
Peter Beazley	Conservative Party	ED	Bedfordshire South
Lord Bethell	Conservative Party	ED	London North West
Beata Brookes	Conservative Party	ED	Wales North
Janey Buchan	Labour Party	SOC	Glasgow
Bryan Cassidy	Conservative Party	ED	Dorset East & Hampshire West
Barbara Castle	Labour Party	SOC	Greater Manchester West
Fred Catherwood	Conservative Party	ED	Cambridgeshire & Bedfordshire North
Kenneth Collins	Labour Party	SOC	Strathclyde East
Richard Cottrell	Conservative Party	ED	Bristol
Christine Crawley	Labour Party	SOC	Birmingham East
Bob Cryer	Labour Party	SOC	Sheffield
David Curry	Conservative Party	ED	Essex North East
Margaret Daly	Conservative Party	ED	Somerset & Dorset West
John de Courcy Ling	Conservative Party	ED	Midlands Central
Basil de Ferranti	Conservative Party	ED	Hampshire Central
Charles Wellesley	Conservative Party	ED	Surrey West
Baroness Elles	Conservative Party	ED	Thames Valley
James Elles	Conservative Party	ED	Oxford & Buckinghamshire
Michael Elliott	Labour Party	SOC	London West
Winifred Ewing	Scottish National Party	EDA	Highlands and Islands
Sheila Faith	Conservative Party	ED	Cumbria & Lancashire North
Alex Falconer	Labour Party	SOC	Scotland Mid & Fife
Glyn Ford	Labour Party	SOC	Greater Manchester East
Win Griffiths	Labour Party	SOC	Wales South
Michael Hindley	Labour Party	SOC	Lancashire East
Geoff Hoon	Labour Party	SOC	Derbyshire
Paul Howell	Conservative Party	ED	Norfolk
Les Huckfield	Labour Party	SOC	Merseyside East
Stephen Hughes	Labour Party	SOC	Durham
John Hume	Social Democratic and Labour Party	SOC	Northern Ireland
Alasdair Hutton	Conservative Party	ED	Scotland South
Caroline Jackson	Conservative Party	ED	Wiltshire
Christopher Jackson	Conservative Party	ED	Kent East
Michael Kilby	Conservative Party	ED	Nottingham
Alfred Lomas	Labour Party	SOC	London North East
John Marshall	Conservative Party	ED	London North
David Martin	Labour Party	SOC	Lothians
Michael McGowan	Labour Party	SOC	Leeds
Hugh McMahon	Labour Party	SOC	Strathclyde West
Edward McMillan-Scott	Conservative Party	ED	York
Tom Megahy	Labour Party	SOC	Yorkshire South West
James Moorhouse	Conservative Party	ED	London South & Surrey East
David Morris	Labour Party	SOC	Wales Mid & West
Stanley Newens	Labour Party	SOC	London Central
Edward Newman	Labour Party	SOC	Greater Manchester Central
Bill Newton Dunn	Conservative Party	ED	Lincolnshire
Tom Normanton	Conservative Party	ED	Cheshire East
Charles Towneley Strachey	Conservative Party	ED	Devon
Ian Paisley	Democratic Unionist Party	NI	Northern Ireland
Ben Patterson	Conservative Party	ED	Kent West
Andrew Pearce	Conservative Party	ED	Cheshire West
Terry Pitt	Labour Party	SOC	Midlands West
Henry Plumb	Conservative Party	ED	Cotswolds
Derek Prag	Conservative Party	ED	Hertfordshire
Peter Price	Conservative Party	ED	London South East
Christopher Prout	Conservative Party	ED	Shropshire & Stafford
James Provan	Conservative Party	ED	Scotland North East
Joyce Quin	Labour Party	SOC	Tyne and Wear
Shelagh Roberts	Conservative Party	ED	London South West
James Scott-Hopkins	Conservative Party	EPP	Hereford & Worcester
Barry Seal	Labour Party	SOC	Yorkshire West
Madron Seligman	Conservative Party	ED	Sussex West
Dr. Alexander Sherlock	Conservative Party	ED	Essex South West
Richard Simmonds	Conservative Party	ED	Wight & Hampshire East
Anthony Simpson	Conservative Party	ED	Northamptonshire
Llewellyn Smith	Labour Party	SOC	Wales South East
George Stevenson	Labour Party	SOC	Staffordshire East
Kenneth Stewart	Labour Party	SOC	Merseyside West
Jack Stewart-Clark	Conservative Party	ED	Sussex East
John Taylor	Ulster Unionist Party	ED	Northern Ireland
John Tomlinson	Labour Party	SOC	Birmingham West
Carole Tongue	Labour Party	SOC	London East
Frederick Tuckman	Conservative Party	ED	Leicester
Amédée Turner	Conservative Party	ED	Suffolk
Peter Vanneck	Conservative Party	ED	Cleveland & Yorkshire North
Michael Welsh	Conservative Party	ED	Lancashire Central
Norman West	Labour Party	SOC	Yorkshire South

== By-elections ==
=== 1987 ===
- 5 March: Midlands West - John Bird (Lab), replacing Terry Pitt who died 3 October 1986

=== 1988 ===
- 15 December: Hampshire Central - Edward Kellett-Bowman (Con), replacing Basil de Ferranti who died 24 September 1988

== Change of Group ==
- John Taylor (UUP) left the European Democrats on 20 January 1987 and joined the European Right group.
