= List of members of the European Parliament for the United Kingdom (1989–1994) =

This is the list of members of the European Parliament for the United Kingdom in the 1989 to 1994 session. Note that during the session, the parliamentary groups to which both major British parties belonged underwent changes. On 1 May 1992, the European Democrats group, consisting mostly of members of the Conservative Party, dissolved and its members were accorded 'associate party' status by the EPP group. On 21 April 1993, the Socialist Group, which included members of the Labour Party, was renamed the Party of European Socialists group.

== List ==
Name	National party	EP Group	Constituency
Gordon Adam	Labour Party	SOC / PES	Northumbria
Richard Balfe	Labour Party	SOC / PES	London South Inner
Roger Barton	Labour Party	SOC / PES	Sheffield
Christopher Beazley	Conservative Party	ED / EPP	Cornwall & Plymouth
Peter Beazley	Conservative Party	ED / EPP	Bedfordshire South
Lord Bethell	Conservative Party	ED / EPP	London North West
John Bird	Labour Party	SOC / PES	Midlands West
David Bowe	Labour Party	SOC / PES	Cleveland & Yorkshire North
Janey Buchan	Labour Party	SOC / PES	Glasgow
Bryan Cassidy	Conservative Party	ED / EPP	Dorset East & Hampshire West
Sir Frederick Catherwood	Conservative Party	ED / EPP	Cambridgeshire & Bedfordshire North
Ken Coates	Labour Party	SOC / PES	Nottingham
Kenneth Collins	Labour Party	SOC / PES	Strathclyde East
Peter Crampton	Labour Party	SOC / PES	Humberside
Christine Crawley	Labour Party	SOC / PES	Birmingham East
Margaret Daly	Conservative Party	ED / EPP	Somerset & Dorset West
Wayne David	Labour Party	SOC / PES	Wales South
Alan Donnelly	Labour Party	SOC / PES	Tyne and Wear
Hon. James Elles	Conservative Party	ED / EPP	Oxford & Buckinghamshire
Michael Elliott	Labour Party	SOC / PES	London West
Winifred Ewing	Scottish National Party	RBW	Highlands and Islands
Alex Falconer	Labour Party	SOC / PES	Scotland Mid & Fife
Glyn Ford	Labour Party	SOC / PES	Greater Manchester East
Pauline Green	Labour Party	SOC / PES	London North
Lyndon Harrison	Labour Party	SOC / PES	Cheshire West
Michael Hindley	Labour Party	SOC / PES	Lancashire East
Geoff Hoon	Labour Party	SOC / PES	Derbyshire
Paul Howell	Conservative Party	ED / EPP	Norfolk
Stephen Hughes	Labour Party	SOC / PES	Durham
John Hume	Social Democratic and Labour Party	SOC / PES	Northern Ireland
Caroline Jackson	Conservative Party	ED / EPP	Wiltshire
Christopher Jackson	Conservative Party	ED / EPP	Kent East
Edward Kellett-Bowman	Conservative Party	ED / EPP	Hampshire Central
Alfred Lomas	Labour Party	SOC / PES	London North East
David Martin	Labour Party	SOC / PES	Lothians
Henry McCubbin	Labour Party	SOC / PES	Scotland North East
Michael McGowan	Labour Party	SOC / PES	Leeds
Anne McIntosh	Conservative Party	ED / EPP	Essex North East
Hugh McMahon	Labour Party	SOC / PES	Strathclyde West
Edward McMillan-Scott	Conservative Party	ED / EPP	York
Tom Megahy	Labour Party	SOC / PES	Yorkshire South West
James Moorhouse	Conservative Party	ED / EPP	London South & Surrey East
David Morris	Labour Party	SOC / PES	Wales Mid & West
Stanley Newens	Labour Party	SOC / PES	London Central
Eddie Newman	Labour Party	SOC / PES	Greater Manchester Central
Bill Newton Dunn	Conservative Party	ED / EPP	Lincolnshire
James Nicholson	Ulster Unionist Party	ED / EPP	Northern Ireland
Christine Oddy	Labour Party	SOC / PES	Midlands Central
Lord O'Hagan	Conservative Party	ED / EPP	Devon
Ian Paisley	Democratic Unionist Party	NI	Northern Ireland
Ben Patterson	Conservative Party	ED / EPP	Kent West
Lord Plumb	Conservative Party	ED / EPP	Cotswolds
Anita Pollack	Labour Party	SOC / PES	London South West
Derek Prag	Conservative Party	ED / EPP	Hertfordshire
Peter Price	Conservative Party	ED / EPP	London South East
Christopher Prout	Conservative Party	ED / EPP	Shropshire & Stafford
Patricia Rawlings	Conservative Party	ED / EPP	Essex South West
Mel Read	Labour Party	SOC / PES	Leicester
James Scott-Hopkins	Conservative Party	ED / EPP	Hereford & Worcester
Barry Seal	Labour Party	SOC / PES	Yorkshire West
Madron Seligman	Conservative Party	ED / EPP	Sussex West
Richard Simmonds	Conservative Party	ED / EPP	Wight & Hampshire East
Anthony Simpson	Conservative Party	ED / EPP	Northamptonshire
Brian Simpson	Labour Party	SOC / PES	Cheshire East
Alex Smith	Labour Party	SOC / PES	Scotland South
Llewellyn Smith	Labour Party	SOC / PES	Wales South East
Tom Spencer	Conservative Party	ED / EPP	Surrey West
John Stevens	Conservative Party	ED / EPP	Thames Valley
George Stevenson	Labour Party	SOC / PES	Staffordshire East
Kenneth Stewart	Labour Party	SOC / PES	Merseyside West
Jack Stewart-Clark	Conservative Party	ED / EPP	Sussex East
Gary Titley	Labour Party	SOC / PES	Greater Manchester West
John Tomlinson	Labour Party	SOC / PES	Birmingham West
Carole Tongue	Labour Party	SOC / PES	London East
Amédée Turner	Conservative Party	ED / EPP	Suffolk
Richard Fletcher-Vane	Conservative Party	ED / EPP	Cumbria & Lancashire North
Michael Welsh	Conservative Party	ED / EPP	Lancashire Central
Norman West	Labour Party	SOC / PES	Yorkshire South
Ian White	Labour Party	SOC / PES	Bristol
Joe Wilson	Labour Party	SOC / PES	Wales North
Terry Wynn	Labour Party	SOC / PES	Merseyside East
