= Bedfordshire and Milton Keynes (European Parliament constituency) =

Former European Parliament constituency

- European Parliament constituency
- Boundary within the East of England (1994-1999)
- Member state: United Kingdom
- Created: 1994
- Dissolved: 1999
- MEPs: 1

Sources
- Election Demon

Bedfordshire and Milton Keynes was a constituency of the European Parliament located in the United Kingdom, electing one Member of the European Parliament by the first-past-the-post electoral system. Created in 1994 from parts of Cambridge and Bedfordshire North and Suffolk, it was abolished in 1999 on the adoption of proportional representation for European elections in Great Britain. It was mostly succeeded by the East of England region, with the remaining part succeeded by the South East England region.

== Boundaries ==
It consisted of the parliamentary constituencies of Luton North, Luton South, Mid Bedfordshire, Milton Keynes South West, North Bedfordshire, North East Milton Keynes and South West Bedfordshire.

Mid Bedfordshire and North Bedfordshire had previously been part of the Cambridge and Bedfordshire North constituency, while Luton North, Luton South, Milton Keynes South West, North East Milton Keynes and South West Bedfordshire had been part of the Bedfordshire South constituency.

Most of the area became part of the East of England constituency in 1999; the Milton Keynes constituencies became part of the South East England constituency.

== MEPs ==
Election	Member	Party
part of Cambridge and Bedfordshire North and Bedfordshire South prior to 1994
1994	Eryl McNally	Labour
1999	constituency abolished, part of East of England from 1999	

== Election results ==
European Parliament election, 1994: Bedfordshire and Milton Keynes
Party	Candidate	Votes	%	±%
Labour	Eryl McNally	94,837	46.6	
Conservative	Edwina Currie	61,628	30.3	
Liberal Democrats	Monica Howes	27,994	13.7	
UKIP	Alan Sked	7,485	3.7	
Green	Alan H Francis	6,804	3.3	
New Britain	Andrew J Howes	3,878	1.9	
Natural Law	Lawrence R Sheaff	939	0.5	
Majority		33,209	16.3	
Turnout		203,565		
Labour win (new seat)				
