= Suffolk (European Parliament constituency) =

Former European Parliament constituency

- European Parliament constituency
- Boundary within the East of England (1979-1984)
- Member state: United Kingdom
- Created: 1979
- Dissolved: 1994
- MEPs: 1

Suffolk was a constituency of the European Parliament located in the United Kingdom, electing one Member of the European Parliament by the first-past-the-post electoral system. Created in 1979 for the first elections to the European Parliament, it was abolished in 1994 and succeeded by the constituencies of Suffolk and South West Norfolk, Essex North and Suffolk South and Cambridgeshire.

Boundary within the East of England (1984-1994)

== Boundaries ==
On its creation in 1979, it consisted of the parliamentary constituencies of Bury St Edmunds, Eye, Harwich, Ipswich, Lowestoft and Sudbury and Woodbridge.

After the 1984 boundary changes based on the new UK parliamentary constituencies created in 1983, it consisted of the constituencies of Bury St. Edmunds, Central Suffolk, Ipswich, South East Cambridgeshire, South Suffolk, Suffolk Coastal and Waveney. South East Cambridgeshire had previously been part of Cambridge and Bedfordshire North, while Harwich was now part of Essex North East.

The constituency was abolished in 1994. Bury St Edmunds, Central Suffolk, Ipswich, Suffolk Coastal and Waveney became part of the new European constituency of Suffolk and South West Norfolk. South East Cambridgeshire was transferred to Cambridgeshire, and Suffolk South to Essex North and Suffolk South.

== MEPs ==
Election	Member	Party
1979	Amédée Edward Turner	Conservative
1994	constituency abolished, part of Suffolk and South West Norfolk from 1994	

== Election results ==
European Parliament election, 1989: Suffolk
Party	Candidate	Votes	%	±%
Conservative	Amédée Edward Turner	82,481	43.6	−10.4
Labour	Michael D Cornish	56,788	30.0	+4.8
Green	A C (Tony) Slade	37,305	19.7	New
SLD	Peter R Odell	12,660	6.7	−14.1
Majority		25,693	13.6	−15.2
Turnout		189,234	34.4	+2.7
Conservative hold		Swing	−7.6	

European Parliament election, 1984: Suffolk
Party	Candidate	Votes	%	±%
Conservative	Amédée Edward Turner	88,243	54.0	−6.4
Labour	Wiktor Moszczynski	41,145	25.2	−1.8
Liberal	Colin L A Leakey	34,084	20.8	+8.3
Majority		47,098	28.8	−4.6
Turnout		163,472	31.7	−0.6
Conservative hold		Swing	−2.3	

European Parliament election, 1979: Suffolk
Party	Candidate	Votes	%	±%
Conservative	Amédée Edward Turner	101,966	60.4	
Labour	R E Manley	45,642	27.0	
Liberal	Lord Gladwyn	21,131	12.5	
Majority		56,324	33.4	
Turnout		168,739	32.3	
Conservative win (new seat)				
