= Oxford and Buckinghamshire (European Parliament constituency) =

Former European Parliament constituency

- European Parliament constituency
- Boundary within the East of England (1984-1994)
- Member state: United Kingdom
- Created: 1984
- Dissolved: 1994
- MEPs: 1

Prior to its uniform adoption of proportional representation in 1999, the United Kingdom used first-past-the-post for the European elections in England, Scotland and Wales. The European Parliament constituencies used under that system were smaller than the later regional constituencies and only had one Member of the European Parliament each.

The constituency of Oxford and Buckinghamshire was one of them.

It consisted of the Westminster Parliament constituencies of Aylesbury, Beaconsfield, Buckingham, Chesham and Amersham, Henley, Oxford East, Oxford West and Abingdon, and Wycombe.

== MEPs ==
| Elected | Member | Party |
|---|---|---|
| 1984 | James Elles | Conservative |
| 1994 | Constituency abolished | |

== Election results ==
European Parliament election, 1984: Oxford and Buckinghamshire
| Party | Candidate | Votes | % | ±% |
|---|---|---|---|---|
| Conservative | James Elles | 94,136 | 52.8 | |
| SDP | Roger J. Liddle | 45,055 | 25.3 | |
| Labour | John G. Power | 39,164 | 21.9 | |
| Majority | | 49,081 | 27.5 | |
| Turnout | | 178,355 | 32.9 | |
| Conservative win (new seat) | | | | |

European Parliament election, 1989: Oxford and Buckinghamshire
| Party | Candidate | Votes | % | ±% |
|---|---|---|---|---|
| Conservative | James Elles | 92,483 | 46.8 | −6.0 |
| Labour | Robert U. Gifford | 44,965 | 22.7 | +0.8 |
| Green | Tim H. Andrewes | 42,058 | 21.3 | New |
| SLD | R. T. (Bob) Johnston | 14,405 | 7.3 | −18.0 |
| Independent | R. C. Turner | 3,696 | 1.9 | New |
| Majority | | 47,518 | 24.1 | −3.4 |
| Turnout | | 197,607 | 35.2 | +2.3 |
| Conservative hold | | Swing | | |
