= Hertfordshire (disambiguation) =

Hertfordshire is a ceremonial county in England.

Hertfordshire may also refer to:

- Hertfordshire (UK Parliament constituency), 1290-1885
- Hertfordshire (European Parliament constituency), 1979-1999

== See also ==
- Herefordshire (disambiguation)
