= Bedfordshire (disambiguation) =

Bedfordshire is a ceremonial county in England.

Bedfordshire may also refer to:

- Bedfordshire (UK Parliament constituency), 1295-1885
- Bedfordshire (European Parliament constituency), 1979-1984
