= Kent West (European Parliament constituency) =

Constituency of the European Parliament from 1979 to 1999

- European Parliament constituency
- Boundary within South East England (1979-1984)
- Member state: United Kingdom
- Created: 1979
- Dissolved: 1999
- MEPs: 1

Prior to its uniform adoption of proportional representation in 1999, the United Kingdom used first-past-the-post for the European elections in England, Scotland and Wales. The European Parliament constituencies used under that system were smaller than the later regional constituencies and only had one Member of the European Parliament each. The constituency of Kent West was one of them.

Boundary within South East England and London (1984-1994)

Boundary within South East England and London (1994-1999)

== Boundaries ==
1979–1984: Dartford; East Surrey; Gillingham; Gravesend; Rochester and Chatham; Royal Tunbridge Wells; Sevenoaks; Tonbridge and Malling.

1984–1994: Dartford; Gillingham; Gravesham; Medway; Mid Kent; Sevenoaks; Tonbridge and Malling; Tunbridge Wells.

1994–1999: Dartford; Gillingham; Gravesham; Maidstone; Medway; Mid Kent; Tonbridge and Malling.

== MEPs ==
Elected	Member	Party
1979	Ben Patterson	Conservative
1994	Peter Skinner	Labour
1999	Constituency abolished: see South East England	

== Election results ==
European Parliament election, 1994: Kent West
Party	Candidate	Votes	%	±%
Labour	Peter Skinner	77,346	41.0	+10.3
Conservative	Ben Patterson	60,569	32.1	−11.3
Liberal Democrats	Jim Daly	33,869	17.9	+9.4
UKIP	Craig Mackinlay	9,750	5.2	New
Green	Penny A. Kemp	5,651	3.0	−14.4
Natural Law	Jeremy J. Bowler	1,598	0.8	New
Majority		16,777	8.9	N/A
Turnout		188,783	37.3	+3.9
Labour gain from Conservative		Swing	+10.8	

European Parliament election, 1989: Kent West
Party	Candidate	Votes	%	±%
Conservative	Ben Patterson	82,519	43.4	−5.5
Labour	Peter L. Sloman	58,469	30.7	+1.6
Green	Jim Tidy	33,202	17.4	+14.5
SLD	J.B. (Brian) Doherty	16,087	8.5	−10.6
Majority		24,050	12.7	−7.1
Turnout		190,277	33.4	+2.6
Conservative hold		Swing	-3.6	

European Parliament election, 1984: Kent West
Party	Candidate	Votes	%	±%
Conservative	Ben Patterson	85,414	48.9	−11.8
Labour	Alan Woodhams	50,784	29.1	+4.3
Liberal	Peter Billenness	33,306	19.1	+4.6
Ecology	Christine A. Bunyan	4,991	2.9	New
Majority		34,630	19.8	−16.1
Turnout		174,495	30.8	−2.1
Conservative hold		Swing	-8.1	

European Parliament election, 1979: Kent West
Party	Candidate	Votes	%	±%
Conservative	Ben Patterson	113,961	60.7	
Labour	Anthony J. Humphris	46.482	24.8	
Liberal	Stanley Blow	27,127	14.5	
Majority		67,479	35.9	
Turnout		187,570	32.9	
Conservative win (new seat)				
