= Cambridgeshire (European Parliament constituency) =

Former European Parliament constituency

Cambridgeshire (1979–1984)
- European Parliament constituency
- Boundary within the East of England (1979-1984)
- Member state: United Kingdom
- Created: 1979
- Dissolved: 1984
- MEPs: 1

Recreated
- Created: 1994
- Dissolved: 1999
- MEPs: 1

Cambridgeshire was a constituency of the European Parliament located in the United Kingdom, electing one Member of the European Parliament by the first-past-the-post electoral system. It was first created in 1979 for the first elections to the European Parliament, but was abolished in 1984 election.

It was re-created in 1994 and abolished in 1999 on the adoption of proportional representation for European elections in Great Britain. It was succeeded by the East of England region.

Boundaries within the East of England (1994-1999)

== Boundaries ==
=== 1979—1984 ===
On its creation in 1979, it consisted of the parliamentary constituencies of Cambridge, Cambridgeshire, Huntingdonshire, Isle of Ely, Peterborough, and Wellingborough.

When it was abolished in 1984, the subsequent seats were based on the parliamentary constituencies created by the 1983 boundary changes. The area covered by the new parliamentary constituencies of Cambridge, Huntingdon, North East Cambridgeshire, Peterborough and South West Cambridgeshire became part of the Cambridge and Bedfordshire North constituency, while Wellingborough was transferred to Northamptonshire and South East Cambridgeshire was transferred to Suffolk.

=== 1994—1999 ===
The Cambridgeshire constituency was re-created in 1994 from parts of Cambridge and Bedfordshire North and Suffolk. The re-established constituency consisted of the Westminster parliamentary constituencies of Cambridge, Huntingdon, North East Cambridgeshire, Peterborough, South East Cambridgeshire and South West Cambridgeshire. Cambridge, Huntingdon, North East Cambridgeshire, Peterborough and South West Cambridgeshire had previously been part of the Cambridge and Bedfordshire North constituency, while South East Cambridgeshire had been part of the Suffolk constituency.

== MEPs ==
Election	Member	Party
1979	Sir Fred Catherwood	Conservative
1984	constituency abolished, see Cambridge and Bedfordshire North	
1994	Robert Sturdy	Conservative
1999	constituency abolished, part of East of England from 1999	

== Election results ==
European Parliament election, 1979: Cambridgeshire
Party	Candidate	Votes	%	±%
Conservative	Sir Fred Catherwood	94,497	59.0	
Labour	M L Mackie	42,038	26.3	
Liberal	M W B O'Loughlin	23,501	14.7	
Majority		52,459	32.7	
Turnout		160,036	32.2	
Conservative win (new seat)				

European Parliament election, 1994: Cambridgeshire
Party	Candidate	Votes	%	±%
Conservative	Robert Sturdy	66,921	37.6	
Labour	Melanie Jane Johnson	62,979	35.4	
Liberal Democrats	Andrew Duff	36,114	20.3	
Green	Margaret Wright	5,756	3.2	
Liberal	Paul Wiggin	4,051	2.3	
Natural Law	Francis Chalmers	2,077	1.2	
Majority		3,942	2.2	
Turnout		177,898		
Conservative win (new seat)				
