= Christopher Beazley =

British politician (born 1952)

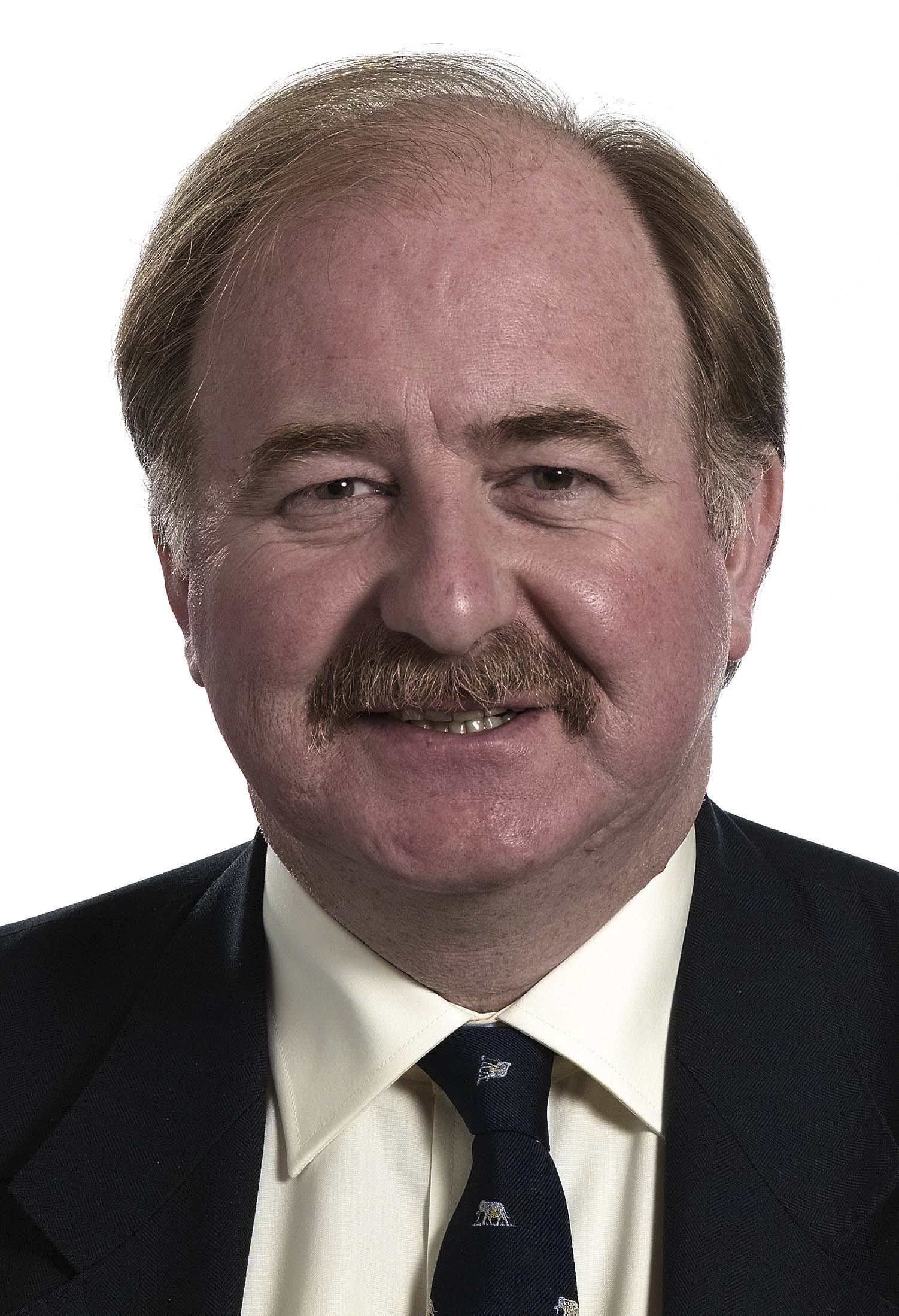
- Beazley in 1999

Member of the European Parliament for East of England
- In office 10 June 1999 – 4 June 2009
- Preceded by: Position established
- Succeeded by: Vicky Ford

Member of the European Parliament for Cornwall and Plymouth
- In office 14 June 1984 – 4 June 1994
- Preceded by: David Harris
- Succeeded by: Position abolished

Personal details
- Born: 5 September 1952 (age 73) Bexhill-on-Sea, East Sussex, England
- Party: Conservative (before 2019); Liberal Democrat (since 2019)
- Parent: Peter Beazley (father)

Christopher Beazley (born 5 September 1952) is a British politician who served as a Member of the European Parliament (MEP) from 1984 to 1994 and again from 1999 to 2009. He was member of the Conservative Party until 2019, when he joined the Liberal Democrats.

== Background ==
Beazley is the son of Peter Beazley, and earned a BA in History at the University of Bristol in 1974. From 1974 to 1976, he worked at the Bank of England, then as a teacher 1976–1983 and as a research officer at the University of Sussex 1983–1984. He has since been a consultant and writer on European affairs.

== Political career ==
Beazley was elected at the 1984 European Parliament election as the MEP for Cornwall and Plymouth, serving alongside his father Peter Beazley, who was the MEP for Bedfordshire South. He was re-elected in 1989, but when his constituency was abolished at the 1994 European Parliament election, he was defeated in the new Cornwall and West Plymouth constituency by the Liberal Democrat candidate Robin Teverson.

He returned to the European Parliament at the 1999 European election 1999 to 2009, when the single-member constituencies were replaced by regional constituencies using a party list form of election. He was elected as an MEP for the East of England, and re-elected in 2004. He was a member of the Committee on Foreign Affairs.

He has been the Conservative spokesman on Culture and Education, Regional Development, Home Affairs and Justice, and Constitutional Affairs.

A centrist conservative, he has been vice-chairman of the Conservative Group for Europe, and has criticised the UK Conservative Party of leaving the European People's Party group.

A few months before he left the European Parliament in 2009, he became a full member of the European People's Party, despite the UK Conservative Party's plans to withdraw from their parliament group, saying, "I cannot watch and say nothing while the Tories walk away from their allies, friends and colleagues in Europe."

== Positions ==
Beazley is a signatory of the Prague Declaration on European Conscience and Communism.

== Quote ==
- "Europe is no more divided, but we are still divided by our experience."
  –Christopher Beazley, Prague, June 2008, in his speech at the conference "Conscience of Europe and Communism" (Svědomí Evropy a komunismus) closing with the Prague Declaration (Pražská deklarace)
