= Hertfordshire (European Parliament constituency) =

Former European Parliament constituency

- European Parliament constituency
- Boundary within the East of England (1979-1984)
- Member state: United Kingdom
- Created: 1979
- Dissolved: 1999
- MEPs: 1

Hertfordshire was a constituency of the European Parliament located in the United Kingdom, electing one Member of the European Parliament by the first-past-the-post electoral system. Created in 1979 for the first elections to the European Parliament, it was abolished in 1999 on the adoption of proportional representation for European elections in Great Britain. It was succeeded by the East of England region.

Boundary within the East of England (1984-1994)

Boundary within the East of England (1994-1999)

== Boundaries ==
On its creation in 1979, it consisted of the parliamentary constituencies of Hertford and Stevenage, Hertfordshire East, Hertfordshire South, Hertfordshire South West, St Albans, Watford and Welwyn and Hatfield.

After the 1984 boundary changes based on the new UK parliamentary constituencies created in 1983, it consisted of the constituencies of Broxbourne, Hertford and Stortford, Hertsmere, St. Albans, South West Hertfordshire, Watford and Welwyn Hatfield. Stevenage was transferred to Bedfordshire South.

1994 saw further boundary changes and the constituency now consisted of Hertsmere, North Hertfordshire, St. Albans, South West Hertfordshire, Watford, Welwyn Hatfield and West Hertfordshire. Broxbourne as well as Hertford and Stortford were now part of Essex West and Hertfordshire East. North Hertfordshire and West Hertfordshire had previously been part of Bedfordshire South.

The entire area became part of the East of England constituency in 1999.

== MEPs ==
Election	Member	Party
1979	Derek Prag	Conservative
1994	Peter Truscott	Labour
1999	constituency abolished, part of East of England from 1999	

== Election results ==
European Parliament election, 1994: Hertfordshire
Party	Candidate	Votes	%	±%
Labour	Peter Derek Truscott	81,821	39.1	+15.7
Conservative	Philip Jenkinson	71,517	34.1	−12.6
Liberal Democrats	David Griffiths	38,995	18.6	+11.4
Green	Lydia Howitt	7,741	3.7	−16.3
New Britain	Malcolm Biggs	6,555	3.1	New
National Front	John McAuley	1,755	0.8	New
Natural Law	David Lucas	734	0.4	New
21st Century Party	John Laine	369	0.2	New
Majority		10,304	5.0	N/A
Turnout		209,487	40.1	+4.1
Labour gain from Conservative		Swing	+14.2	

European Parliament election, 1989: Hertfordshire
Party	Candidate	Votes	%	±%
Conservative	Derek Prag	86,898	46.7	−4.8
Labour	Vidya S Anand	43,556	23.4	−1.1
Green	Mark F Ames	37,277	20.0	New
SLD	Michael D Phelan	13,456	7.2	−16.8
SDP	Catherine Treves-Brown	5,048	2.7	New
Majority		43,342	23.3	−3.7
Turnout		186,235	36.0	+2.3
Conservative hold		Swing	−1.9	

European Parliament election, 1984: Hertfordshire
Party	Candidate	Votes	%	±%
Conservative	Derek Prag	87,603	51.5	+1.3
Labour	Tony McWalter	41,671	24.5	−1.1
Liberal	Fiona M Beckett	40,877	24.0	−0.2
Majority		45,932	27.0	+2.4
Turnout		170,151	33.7	−3.2
Conservative hold		Swing	+1.2	

European Parliament election, 1979: Hertfordshire
Party	Candidate	Votes	%	±%
Conservative	Derek Prag	97,174	50.2	
Labour	J Dore	49,619	25.6	
Liberal	D A F Lytton Cobbold	46,757	24.2	
Majority		47,555	24.6	
Turnout		193,550	36.9	
Conservative win (new seat)				
