= Cambridge and Bedfordshire North (European Parliament constituency) =

Former European Parliament constituency

- European Parliament constituency
- Boundary the East of England (1984-1994)
- Member state: United Kingdom
- Created: 1984
- Dissolved: 1994
- MEPs: 1

Cambridge and Bedfordshire North was a constituency of the European Parliament located in the United Kingdom, electing one Member of the European Parliament by the first-past-the-post electoral system. Created in 1984 from parts of Cambridgeshire and Bedfordshire, it was abolished in 1994 and succeeded by Cambridgeshire and Bedfordshire and Milton Keynes.

== Boundaries ==
On its creation in 1984, it consisted of the parliamentary constituencies of Cambridge, Huntingdon, Mid Bedfordshire, North Bedfordshire, North East Cambridgeshire, Peterborough, South East Cambridgeshire and South West Cambridgeshire.

When it was abolished in 1994, the parliamentary constituencies of Cambridge, Huntingdon, North East Cambridgeshire, Peterborough and South West Cambridgeshire became part of the Cambridgeshire constituency, while Mid Bedfordshire and North Bedfordshire were transferred to Bedfordshire and Milton Keynes.

== MEPs ==
Election	Member	Party
Cambridgeshire and Bedfordshire prior to 1984
1984	Sir Fred Catherwood	Conservative
1994	constituency abolished, see Cambridgeshire and Bedfordshire and Milton Keynes	

== Election results ==
European Parliament election, 1989: Cambridge and Bedfordshire North
Party	Candidate	Votes	%	±%
Conservative	Sir Fred Catherwood	84,044	44.5	−8.9
Labour	Martin Strube	51,723	27.4	+3.3
Green	Margaret E Wright	37,956	20.1	New
SLD	Andrew Duff	15,052	8.0	−14.5
Majority		52,459	32.7	+3.4
Turnout		188,775	33.6	+2.8
Conservative hold		Swing	−6.1	

European Parliament election, 1984: Cambridge and Bedfordshire North
Party	Candidate	Votes	%	±%
Conservative	Sir Fred Catherwood	86,117	53.4	
Labour	Henry Bottomley	38,901	24.1	
Liberal	Andrew Duff	36,341	22.5	
Majority		47,216	29.3	
Turnout		161,359	30.8	
Conservative win (new seat)				
