= Peter Beazley =

British businessman and politician (1922–2004)

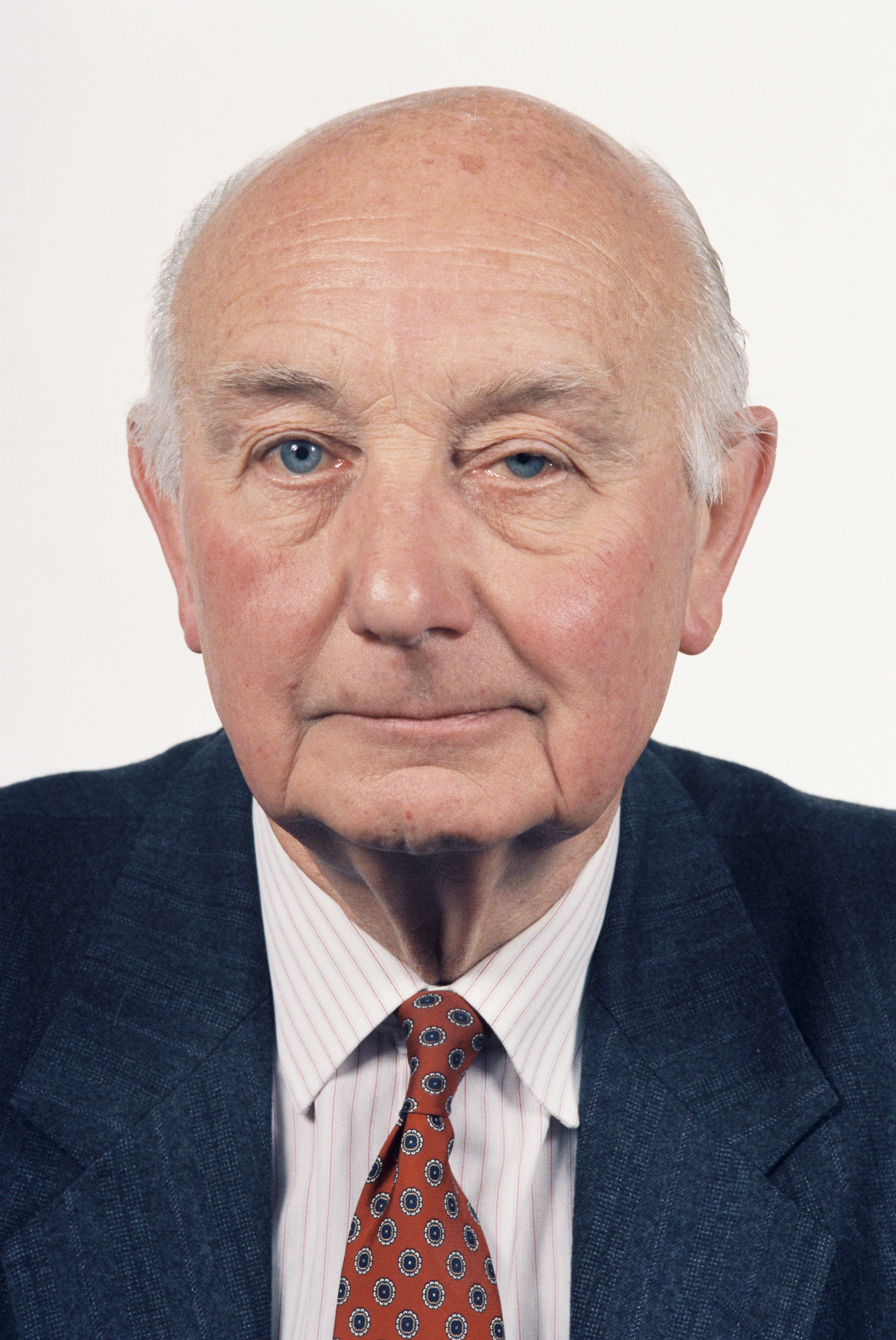

Member of the European Parliament
- In office 7 June 1979 – 9 June 1994
- Constituency: Bedfordshire (1979–1984); Bedfordshire South (1984–1994)

Personal details
- Party: Conservative Party (UK)
- Other party: European Democrats

Peter George Beazley CBE (9 June 1922 – 23 December 2004) was a British businessman and Conservative Party politician who worked for Imperial Chemical Industries for over thirty years. He went on to serve for fifteen years as a Member of the European Parliament (MEP).

== Education and wartime career ==
Beazley was educated at Highgate School, and then went up to St John's College, Oxford, where he read philosophy, politics and economics. In 1942, on leaving Oxford during the Second World War, he joined the Rifle Brigade, with whom he served in north Africa, Italy and Austria. He reached the rank of captain.

== ICI ==
Demobilised in 1947, Beazley joined Imperial Chemical Industries (ICI) as a manager. In his early career with the company he was often stationed abroad: in Germany for seven years, and also in Portugal, Belgium and South Africa. He was promoted to be a General Manager, a divisional board director and eventually Vice Chairman of the company. He was also a Managing Director of some of ICI's associated companies. Beazley learned to speak four foreign languages well, owing to his foreign travels. He was a Research Fellow of the Royal Institution of International Affairs in 1977–78.

== Conservative politics ==
Beazley retired from ICI in 1978, having been selected as Conservative Party candidate in Bedfordshire for the 1979 European Parliament election. This constituency was considered a marginal before the election, for it included Labour-voting towns such as Luton and Bedford as well as Hemel Hempstead. However, with the help of a collapse in the Labour vote in the wake of that party's loss of the May 1979 general election, Beazley won with a majority of 53,600.

== Member of the European Parliament ==
Beazley concentrated on the European Community's impact on business, trying to provide business with information on legislation and regulations being proposed in Brussels. In January 1981, he opposed a call for the Ireland national rugby union team to cancel a tour of apartheid South Africa, justifying his stance on the grounds that multiracial rugby was practised throughout South Africa. He was part of the Bureau of the European Democratic Group, responsible for guiding the political leadership of the group, in 1982–83.

After boundary changes, Beazley was re-elected for Bedfordshire South in the 1984 European Parliament election. At the same election his son Christopher Beazley was elected as MEP for Cornwall and Plymouth. Peter Beazley was put on the powerful Economic and Monetary Affairs and Industrial Policy Committee, and served as vice-chairman from 1984 to 1989. At the 1989 election his majority was cut to 2,977.

== Political views ==
Beazley maintained his support for European integration when opinion within the Conservative Party began to grow sceptical in the early 1990s. He complained that those critical of European Community decision-making often forgot that the European Parliament scrutinised all legislation through committees, which could call experts to give evidence about their effects. Aged 70, he announced in 1993 that he would stand down at the next election; that year he received the CBE. During his last few weeks in office, Beazley worked to stop a European Commission proposal to ban the sale of motorbikes with over 100 brake horsepower.

== Retirement ==
The former junior health minister Edwina Currie was selected to succeed him as Conservative candidate, but lost the seat to Labour in the 1994 election. After the election Beazley ruefully observed "They told us it would be a doddle with Edwina".
