= St Michael's Catholic High School =

Secondary school in Watford, England

Saint Michael's Catholic High School
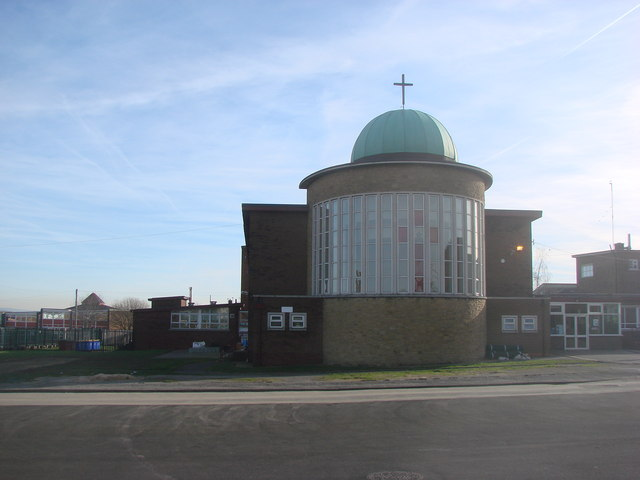

Location
- High Elms Lane; Garston, Hertfordshire, WD25 0SS; England; 51.703°N 0.389°W

Information
- Type: Academy
- Motto: Veritas (Latin: "Truth")
- Religious affiliation: Roman Catholic
- Established: 1955
- Department for Education URN: 137922 Tables
- Ofsted: Reports
- Chair of Governors: K Rylett
- Headmaster: Edward Conway
- Gender: Co-educational
- Age: 11 to 18
- Enrolment: 1068
- Houses: Fountains, Iona, Kells, Lindisfarne, Rievaulx, Whitby
- Colours: Blue, white
- Website: http://www.stmichaelscatholichighschool.co.uk/

Saint Michael's Catholic High School is a co-educational secondary school, specialist college and sixth form located in Garston, a suburb of Watford, Hertfordshire. In September 2010, Edward Conway succeeded headteacher John Murphy.

== History ==
St Michael's Catholic High School was founded by the Dominican Sisters of St Catherine of Siena in 1955.

The school became a comprehensive school in 1966, thus catering for the full range of student abilities. This brought with it the first significant enlargement of the facilities. The science laboratories and new classrooms supplemented the original main corridor as part of the restructuring. In the 1990s, the school spent a period of time under grant-maintained schools status. This led to the construction of the current administration block. Since 2000 there has been considerable upgrading of existing buildings in addition to construction of completely new wings. The first of these was the St Martin de Porres wing which houses the English department and Drama Studio. Next came a floodlit astroturf, providing all-weather outdoor sports facilities. Then came St Mary's wing, housing the Geography department and a media centre.

In September 2005, St Michael's Catholic High School became a Humanities specialist college. A new Sixth Form block, the Aquinas Centre, was opened in September 2008. On 29 September 2009, the school chapel reopened after a £200,000 refurbishment. In March 2010, the St Bernadette Sports Hall was opened. The additional funding that came with this accolade was primarily used to construct the St Mary's wing. On 1 March 2012, the school joined the Diocese of Westminster's academy trust.

== Pastoral structure ==
The school standard intake number is 168, but can accommodate up to 180 students per annum in six tutor groups. Each tutor group is named after a monastic institution of learning, namely: Fountains Abbey, Iona Abbey, Abbey of Kells, Lindisfarne Abbey, Rievaulx Abbey and Whitby Abbey. Students generally remain with the same tutor group throughout their education and year groups are therefore crossed vertically by house groups. Assemblies are conducted in year groups whereas school Masses are celebrated in house groups. Each year group is led by a Pastoral Academic Learning Co-Ordinator (PALC), who is in turn supported by six tutors and additional staff. Students aged 16–18 progress into the Sixth Form.

== Community ==
The community choir regularly sings in neighbouring parishes, both Roman Catholic, Anglican and other denominations. The orchestra regularly performs at St Mary's Church in central Watford. Both the choir and orchestra are regularly involved in Archdiocesan liturgical celebrations. The school regularly produces its news magazine, The Word. Since September 2007, this has been sponsored by the Watford Observer newspaper, which publishes the magazine on a termly basis a supplement to its newspaper.

== Partnerships ==
The Garston Campus partnership involves St Michael's Catholic High School and Parmiter's School, both of which are situated on High Elms Lane. Inter-school departmental meetings take place twice per academic year. The 14–19 St Alban's Consortium comprises St Michael's Catholic High School, Nicholas Breakspear School, St Albans Girls' School and Loreto College. The Consortium was formed in response to the government's Extended Schools initiative. Saint Michael's Catholic High School is the hub school for this group.

== Notable former pupils ==
- Adam Bowden (born 1982), athlete
- Nigel Callaghan (born 1962), footballer
- Craig Mackail-Smith (born 1984), footballer
- Gary Phillips (born 1961), footballer
- Paul Robinson (born 1978), footballer

== Notable former staff ==
- Eryl McNally (born 1942), Member of the European Parliament
