= Bedfordshire South (European Parliament constituency) =

Former European Parliament constituency

- European Parliament constituency
- Boundary the East of England (1984-1994)
- Member state: United Kingdom
- Created: 1984
- Dissolved: 1994
- MEPs: 1

Bedfordshire South was a constituency of the European Parliament located in the United Kingdom, electing one Member of the European Parliament by the first-past-the-post electoral system. Created in 1984 from parts of Bedfordshire and Northamptonshire, it was abolished in 1994 and succeeded by Bedfordshire and Milton Keynes.

== Boundaries ==
It consisted of the parliamentary constituencies of Luton South, Milton Keynes, North Hertfordshire, Luton North, South West Bedfordshire, Stevenage, and West Hertfordshire.

When it was abolished in 1994, the parliamentary constituencies of Luton South, Luton North, South West Bedfordshire and the new seats of Milton Keynes South West and North East Milton Keynes became part of the Bedfordshire and Milton Keynes constituency, while North Hertfordshire and West Hertfordshire were transferred to Hertfordshire, and Stevenage was transferred to Essex West and Hertfordshire East.

== MEPs ==
Election	Member	Party
Bedfordshire and part of Northamptonshire prior to 1984
1984	Peter Beazley	Conservative
1994	constituency abolished: see Bedfordshire and Milton Keynes, Hertfordshire and Essex W and Herts E	

== Election results ==
European Parliament election, 1989: Bedfordshire South
Party	Candidate	Votes	%	±%
Conservative	Peter George Beazley	73,406	38.6	−4.9
Labour	Tony McWalter	70,429	37.0	+2.5
Green	David G Everett	34,508	18.1	New
Liberal Democrats	William M Johnston	8,748	4.6	−17.4
SDP	Richard Müller	3,067	1.6	New
Majority		2,977	1.6	−7.4
Turnout		190,158	33.8	+2.2
Conservative hold		Swing	−3.7	

European Parliament election, 1984: Bedfordshire South
Party	Candidate	Votes	%	±%
Conservative	Peter George Beazley	72,088	43.5	
Labour	W (Bill) Cochrane	57,106	34.5	
Liberal	P A Dixon	36,444	22.0	
Majority		14,982	9.0	
Turnout		165,638	31.6	
Conservative win (new seat)				
