= Adam Bowden =

British athlete

Personal information
- Nationality: British (English)
- Born: 5 August 1982 (age 43) Watford, Hertfordshire

Sport
- Sport: Athletics
- Event: Steeplechase
- Club: Harrow AC

Adam Paul Bowden (born 5 August 1982) is a British former international triathlete and international runner who specialised in the 3000 metres steeplechase.

== Early life and education ==
Adam is originally from Watford, Hertfordshire and was educated at St. Michael's Catholic High School. He was a national level swimmer as a teenager before concentrating on athletics.

== Athletics ==
As an athlete, he represented Great Britain on the road, cross country and track. He is a member of Harrow athletic club and holds the club records for 3,000 metres Steeplechase and 10,000 metres. In 2001 he represented Great Britain in the World Junior Cross Country Championships and finished 6th in the European Junior Cross Country Championships later that year behind Mo Farah (who finished second). In 2006 he competed in the Commonwealth Games (finishing 9th) and European Championships steeplechase.

After missing 2007 through injury, he became British 3000 metres steeplechase champion after winning the British Athletics Championships in 2008.

== Triathlon ==
Since 2008, Adam has been a professional triathlete, and is currently trains at the Welsh triathlon centre based at Cardiff Metropolitan University. Following a 2016 ITU World Triathlon Series where he finished the season ranked in 9th place, Adam achieved his highest placing in an individual ITU World Triathlon Series event of 4th, at the Leeds round in 2017 ITU World Triathlon Series.

== Personal bests ==
- All information from Power of 10

Event	Time	Date	Place
1500 m	3:40.83	25 June 2005	Solihull
3000 m	7:51.33	4 June 2008	Twickenham
5000 m	13:50.86	31 May 2008	Manchester
3000 m S/C	8:28.43	22 July 2006	Heusden
