= Eryl McNally =

British politician (born 1942)

Eryl Margaret McNally
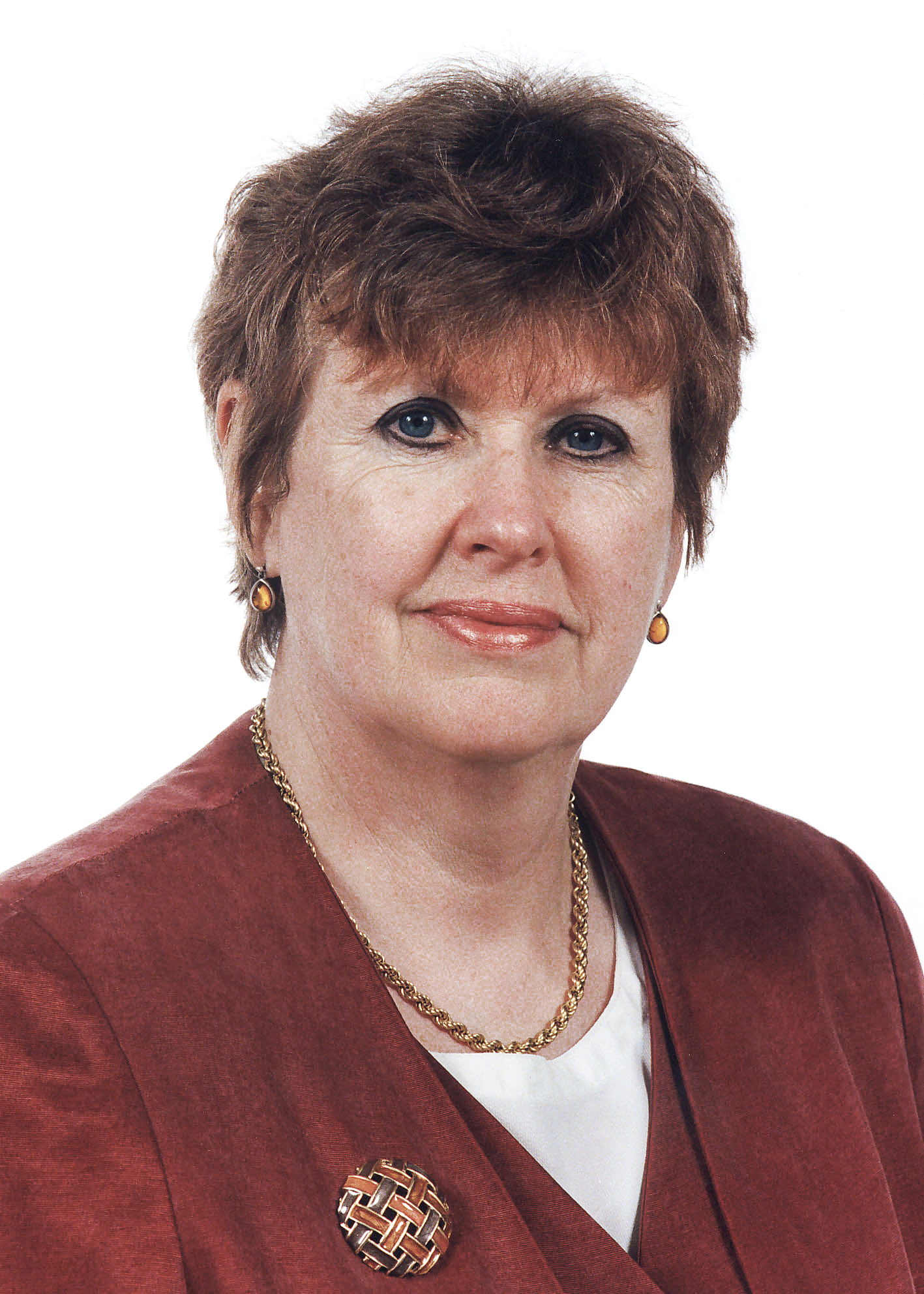
- McNally in 1994

Member of the European Parliament for East of England
- In office 10 June 1999 – 10 June 2004
- Preceded by: Position established
- Succeeded by: Position abolished

Member of the European Parliament for Bedfordshire & Milton Keynes
- In office 9 June 1994 – 10 June 1999
- Preceded by: Position established
- Succeeded by: Position abolished

Personal details
- Born: 11 April 1942 (age 83) Bangor, Wales, UK
- Party: Labour
- Occupation: Schoolteacher

Eryl Margaret McNally (born 11 April 1942) is a former Labour Member of the European Parliament (MEP) for the East of England constituency.

== Personal life ==
She was born in Bangor, North Wales but has lived in Abbots Langley, near Watford, Hertfordshire, since the 1960s. She is the daughter of the late Llywelyn Williams, MP for Abertillery from 1950 to 1965.

She attended Newbridge Grammar School in Monmouthshire and Bristol University, graduating in Modern Languages in 1963. She obtained a PGCE from University College Swansea in 1964.

Before being elected as an MEP in 1994, she was a teacher of modern languages in Reading and Hertfordshire. She was Head of Modern Foreign Languages at Saint Michael's Catholic High School, Watford. In 1985 she became an Advisory Teacher for Buckinghamshire County Council and was later appointed as County National Curriculum Co-ordinator for Modern Languages. She was an Ofsted Inspector for Modern Languages from 1992–1994.

== Family ==
She married James McNally in 1964 and they have two grown up children and two grandsons, Leo and Nye Farrington.

== Political life ==
McNally joined the Labour Party at the age of 16 and served as a Parish Councillor, a District Councillor on Watford Rural District Council and Three Rivers District Council (from 1970–1976) and as County Councillor on Hertfordshire County Council (from 1986 to 1995) where she was Vice- Chair of the Education Committee before being elected to the European Parliament. She represented the Bedfordshire and Milton Keynes constituency from 1994 to 1999 and the East of England constituency from 1999 until she stood down from the Parliament in 2004, saying that the regional constituencies were too large an area to represent and that no-one had "the foggiest idea" who their MEPs are. She was an opponent of the Iraq War.

Her political interests in the European Parliament were in renewable energy and environmental issues. She is a former trustee and Chair of the National Energy Foundation, President of the European Forum on Renewable Energy Sources (EUFORES) and was formerly vice-chair of the European Parliament's Energy and Research Committee. She served as a substitute member of the Committee on Women's Rights and Equal Opportunities and as a member of the delegation for relations with the countries of South America and MERCOSUR.

== Honours ==
In 2003, McNally was awarded the position. of Chevalier in the Légion d'Honneur by the French Government in recognition of her efforts to improve understanding between Britain and France. She was awarded an honorary doctorate in Law by the University of Hertfordshire and was awarded an honorary Doctorate in Science by Cranfield University. In 2012 she obtained a first class honours degree in psychology from the Open University.

== Affiliations ==
She is or has been a member of the Transport and General Workers Union, the World Development Movement, Action for Southern Africa, the Socialist Education Association, the Labour Animal Welfare Society, Amnesty International, the Co-operative Party and the Fabian Society.
