= Herefordshire (disambiguation) =

Herefordshire is a county in England.

Herefordshire may also refer to:

- Herefordshire (UK Parliament constituency), a Parliament constituency
- Herefordshire County Cricket Club, a minor county cricket club in England

== See also ==
- Hertfordshire (disambiguation)
