= Amédée Turner =

British politician (1929–2021)

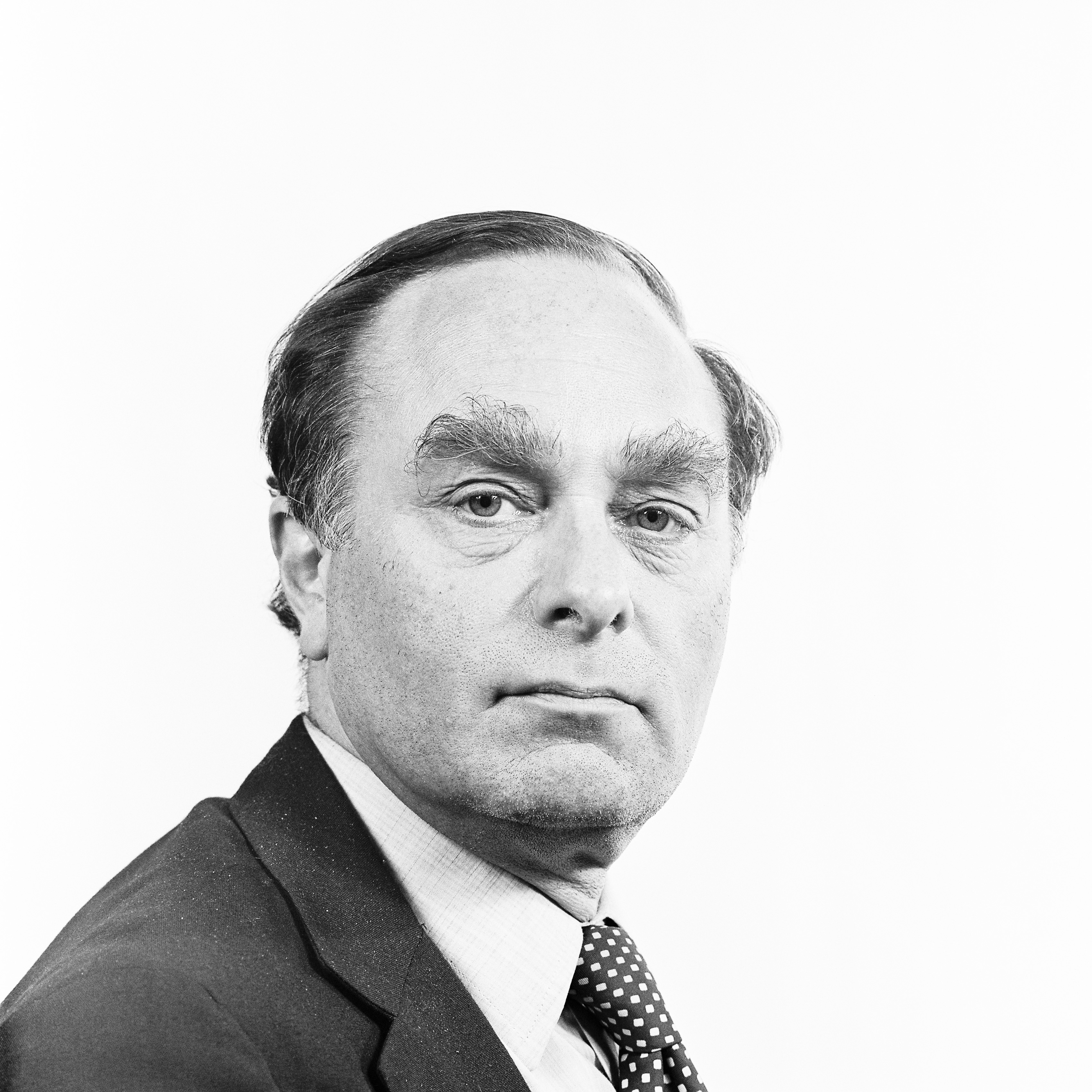
European Parliament portrait

Amédée Edward Turner QC (26 March 1929 – 13 September 2021) was a British barrister and politician, who served for fifteen years as a Conservative Party Member of the European Parliament. As an English patent lawyer he worked both in New York City and in London. A strong supporter of British membership of the European Union, he resisted proposals to impose worker participation on British business, and eventually became Chief Whip of the European Democratic Group. After losing his seat he returned to business as a senior counsel in Brussels.

== Family and education ==
Turner's mother, Ruth Hempson, came from a Huguenot Swiss family, and his parents moved in 1946 to a converted Jacobean barn in Westleton, Suffolk. His family were wealthy and he had a fee-paying education at Temple Grove preparatory school in Heron's Ghyll, Sussex, and Dauntsey's School in Wiltshire. At Christ Church, Oxford he read law and in 1954 he was called to the bar by the Inner Temple. He immediately went into practice at the Patent Bar.

== Patent law ==
In 1957, Turner was made an associate of Kenyon & Kenyon, patent attorneys, in New York City; he was an adviser on English patent law to American clients. He returned to London in 1960, to continue as a specialist in patent law, and in the same year he married Deborah Dudley Owen, who was from an American family. In 1962 he wrote "The Law of Trade Secrets". Turner acted for Eli Lilly and Co. Ltd. against the Chelsea Drug Chemical Co. Ltd for infringing the patent on penicillin; he succeeded in persuading the Judge to grant the injunction.

== Political candidate ==
Turner began writing study papers for the Conservative Party in 1950, and was selected as candidate for Norwich North for the 1964 general election. Norwich North was a Labour-held seat and Turner was defeated by 6,491 votes, but the swing in the constituency was below 1% to Labour in contrast to a national trend of 3.2%. Reselected in March 1965, he fought the seat again in the 1966 general election but suffered a 4.7% swing and lost by 8,926 votes.

In the aftermath of Enoch Powell's Rivers of Blood speech and during the passage of the Race Relations Act 1968, Turner wrote to The Times to endorse the principle of a legal remedy for racial discrimination, but said that people were genuinely concerned at being "swamped by coloured people where they live". He argued that residents should be able to complain to a race relations board about overcrowding in a particular house, or an undue number of homes being taken over by coloured families. On his third attempt in Norwich North, Turner was again defeated at the 1970 general election.

== Europe ==
After twenty years' legal practice, Turner "took silk" in 1976 to become a Queen's Counsel. In 1978 he argued that there should be no prohibition on the Monarch taking communion from a Roman Catholic priest, nor on the Head of the Church of England marrying a Catholic, provided that the Monarch and heir to the throne remain Protestant Anglican. Having chambers in Munich as well as London gave Turner experience of business practice on the continent. When the European Parliament was opened to direct elections, Turner was chosen as Conservative candidate for Suffolk, and at the 1979 election he was easily elected.

=== Worker participation ===
Turner took heavy committee responsibilities at the European Parliament, where he was appointed vice-chairman of the Legal committee, as well as serving on the Economic and Monetary Committee, and the ACP Joint Assembly. In November 1979 he used his position on the Legal committee to argue against a European directive laying down a requirement on employers to consult with workers on major decisions affecting their workplace. The committee's final report, agreed in February 1980, was largely written by Turner and rejected the European Commission's proposals which had been prepared eight years previously. Later that year he also defeated the requirement for British companies to have 'worker directors'.

=== British membership ===
With concern about the British contribution to the European Community budget, in July 1980 Turner argued in favour of a proposal from Transport Commissioner Ray Burke for providing EC funds to improve transport links; he believed the ports of Ipswich, Felixstowe, Harwich in his constituency would benefit from the investment, as well as British Rail. In a debate with leading opponent of British membership Teddy Taylor in September 1981, Turner defended British membership and argued that there was no room for a "half-way house attitude" to the EEC. Turner wanted to see a Europe-wide competition to design a flag of Europe, rather than adopting the Council of Europe's flag.

== European Parliament roles ==
Turner served on the Transport committee from 1981 to 1984, and on the Energy and Technology committee from 1983 to 1989. He was re-elected in a boundary-changed constituency in the 1984 and 1989 elections. Serving from 1984 to 1989 as the spokesman on energy research and technology for the European Democratic Group which included the Conservative MEPs, from 1989 to 1992 he was Chief Whip of the group. When the Conservative MEPs joined the European People's Party in 1992, Turner was named chairman of the Committee on Internal Affairs and Civil Rights. He was also a member of the EPP's ruling bureau.

At the 1994 election, Turner fought for re-election in the Suffolk and South West Norfolk constituency. The Liberal Democrats pointed to the fact that he had voted in 1990 to support a motion calling for "a European union on a federal basis" and economic and monetary union, including a single currency, which did not reflect Conservative policy. Turner ended up losing his seat to Labour's David Thomas.

== Subsequent career ==
Turner returned to work as senior counsel in Brussels to Oppenheimer, Wolff and Donnelly, a United States law firm. He also represented lobbyists APCO Europe from 1995 to 1999 and WorldSpace Ltd from 1999 to 2001. From 1999 he was a director of CJA Consultants Ltd., becoming chairman in 2004. Turner assisted the Macedonian Parliament to play a fuller part in the political system, and revised its rules of procedure, in 2001–02 as part of the PHARE programme. He was a member of the Advisory Council to the Anglican Observer mission to the United Nations from 2002 to 2006. In 2005–06 he wrote a report on Anglican, Episcopalian and Muslim discussions on the attitudes of lay Muslims to democracy and human rights in the US and Britain. In Jan 2014 he produced a 44 pp report entitled “Everything that is in the Qur’an described by a non-Muslim for non-Muslims”. He also wrote reports on patent litigation insurance for the European Commission in 2003 and 2006. In 2017, he published “All the Qur’an in a 100 Pages by a Non-Muslim for Non-Muslims” (Amazon publication).
