= Bedfordshire (European Parliament constituency) =

Former European Parliament constituency

- European Parliament constituency
- Boundary within South East England (1979-1984)
- Member state: United Kingdom
- Created: 1979
- Dissolved: 1984
- MEPs: 1

Bedfordshire was a constituency of the European Parliament located in the United Kingdom, electing one Member of the European Parliament by the first-past-the-post electoral system. Created in 1979 for the first elections to the European Parliament, it was abolished in 1984 and succeeded by Cambridge and Bedfordshire North and Bedfordshire South.

== Boundaries ==
It consisted of the parliamentary constituencies of Bedford, Mid Bedfordshire, South Bedfordshire, Hemel Hempstead, Hitchin, Luton East, and Luton West.

When it was abolished in 1984, the subsequent seats were based on the parliamentary constituencies created by the 1983 boundary changes. The area covered by the new parliamentary constituencies of Mid Bedfordshire and North Bedfordshire became part of the Cambridge and Bedfordshire North constituency, while the new constituencies of South West Bedfordshire, Stevenage, West Hertfordshire, Luton North and Luton South were transferred to Bedfordshire South.

== MEPs ==
Election	Member	Party
1979	Peter Beazley	Conservative
1984	constituency abolished, see Cambridge and Bedfordshire North and Bedfordshire South	

== Elections ==
1979 European Parliament election in the United Kingdom: Bedfordshire
Party	Candidate	Votes	%	±%
Conservative	Peter George Beazley	102,054	58.8	
Labour	M N Elliott	48,454	27.9	
Liberal	Paul D Roberts	21,943	12.6	
Independent; Centre-Right	T H Shrive	1,198	0.7	
Majority		53,600	30.9	
Turnout		515,236	33.7	
Conservative win (new seat)				
