= Ben Patterson (politician) =

British writer and Conservative Party politician

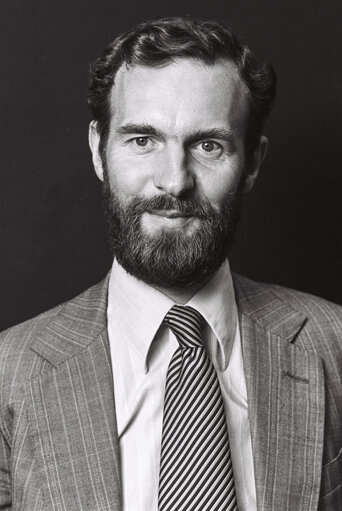

Member of the European Parliament for Kent West
- In office 7 June 1979 – 19 July 1994

Personal details
- Born: George Benjamin Patterson; 21 April 1939 (age 87) Hemel Hempstead, England
- Citizenship: United Kingdom
- Party: Conservative

George Benjamin Patterson (born 21 April 1939) is a British writer and former Conservative Party politician.

Ben Patterson was born in Hemel Hempstead. He was educated at Westminster School, Trinity College, Cambridge, and the London School of Economics. His first job was as a tutor at Swinton Conservative College, lecturing on the Common Market.

From 1968 to 1971 he was a Councillor on the London Borough of Hammersmith.

In 1979, at the first direct elections to the European Parliament, Patterson was elected as a Member of the European Parliament (MEP) for Kent West. He served as vice-chairman of the Committee on Economic and Monetary Affairs and Industrial Policy from January 1992 until he was defeated in the 1994 European elections.

== Bibliography ==
Patterson wrote many publications, including the following:

- Direct Elections to the European Parliament (1974)
- Powers of the European Parliament (1979)
- Purse-Strings of Europe (1979)
- Vredeling and All That (1984)
- Europe and Employment (1984)
- VAT: The Zero Rate Issue (1988)
- European Monetary Union (1991)
- A European Currency: on track for 1999? (1994)
- Options for a Definitive VAT System (1995)
- The Co-ordination of National Fiscal Policies (1996)
- The Consequences of Abolishing Duty Free (1997)
- Adjusting to Asymmetric Shocks (1998)
- The Feasibility of a 'Tobin Tax' (1999)
- The Determination of Interest Rates (1999)
- Exchange Rates and Monetary Policy (2000)
- Tax Co-ordination in the EU (2002)
- Background to the Euro (2003)
- Public Debt (2003)
- The Euro: Success or Failure? (2006)
- Understanding the EU Budget (2011)
