= Fred Catherwood =

British politician and writer (1925–2014)

Sir Fred Catherwood
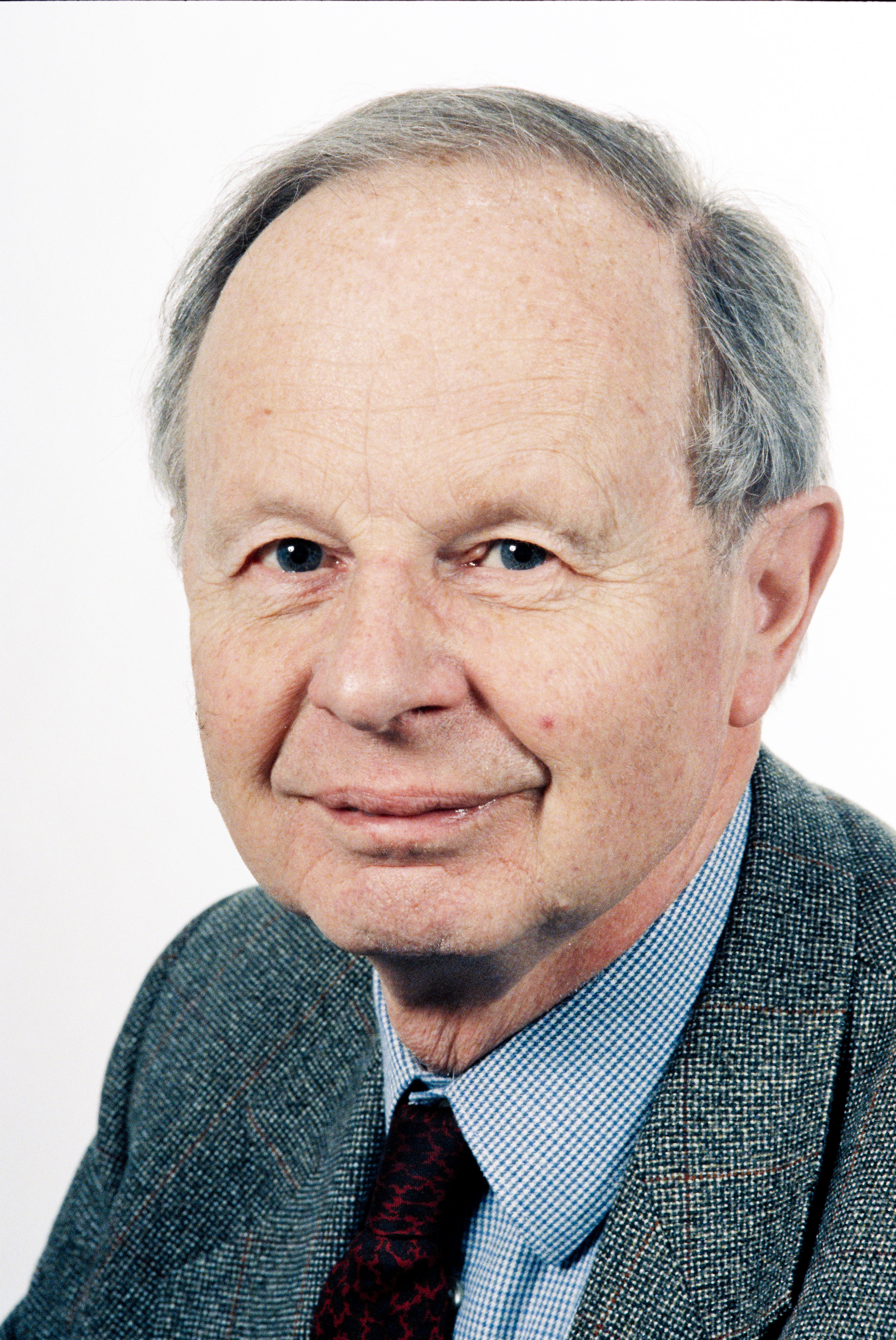
- European Parliament portrait of Catherwood

Member of the European Parliament for Cambridge and Bedfordshire North
- In office 1984–1994
- Preceded by: Constituency established
- Succeeded by: Robert Sturdy

Member of the European Parliament for Cambridgeshire
- In office 1979–1984
- Preceded by: Parliament established
- Succeeded by: Constituency abolished

Personal details
- Born: Henry Frederick Ross Catherwood; 30 January 1925 Castledawson, County Londonderry, Northern Ireland
- Died: 30 November 2014 (aged 89) Cambridge, Cambridgeshire, England
- Party: Conservative

Sir Henry Frederick Ross Catherwood (30 January 1925 – 30 November 2014) was a British politician and writer.

== Early life and education ==
Catherwood was born at Castledawson, County Londonderry, Northern Ireland. He was educated at Shrewsbury School and Clare College, Cambridge.

== Career ==
He was former Director General of the National Economic Development Council, Chief industrial Adviser at the Department of Economic Affairs (1964–66), President of the Evangelical Alliance and President of the International Fellowship of Evangelical Students (IFES). He was knighted in 1971. From 1972 to 1976 he was Chairman of the Institute of Management and Chairman of the British Overseas Trade Board (1975–79).

Catherwood was committed to economic co-operation within the European community for much of his professional life. He was elected as a Conservative member of the European Parliament for Cambridgeshire and related areas from 1979 until his retirement in 1994. He was Vice President of the European Parliament 1989–1992.

== Personal life ==
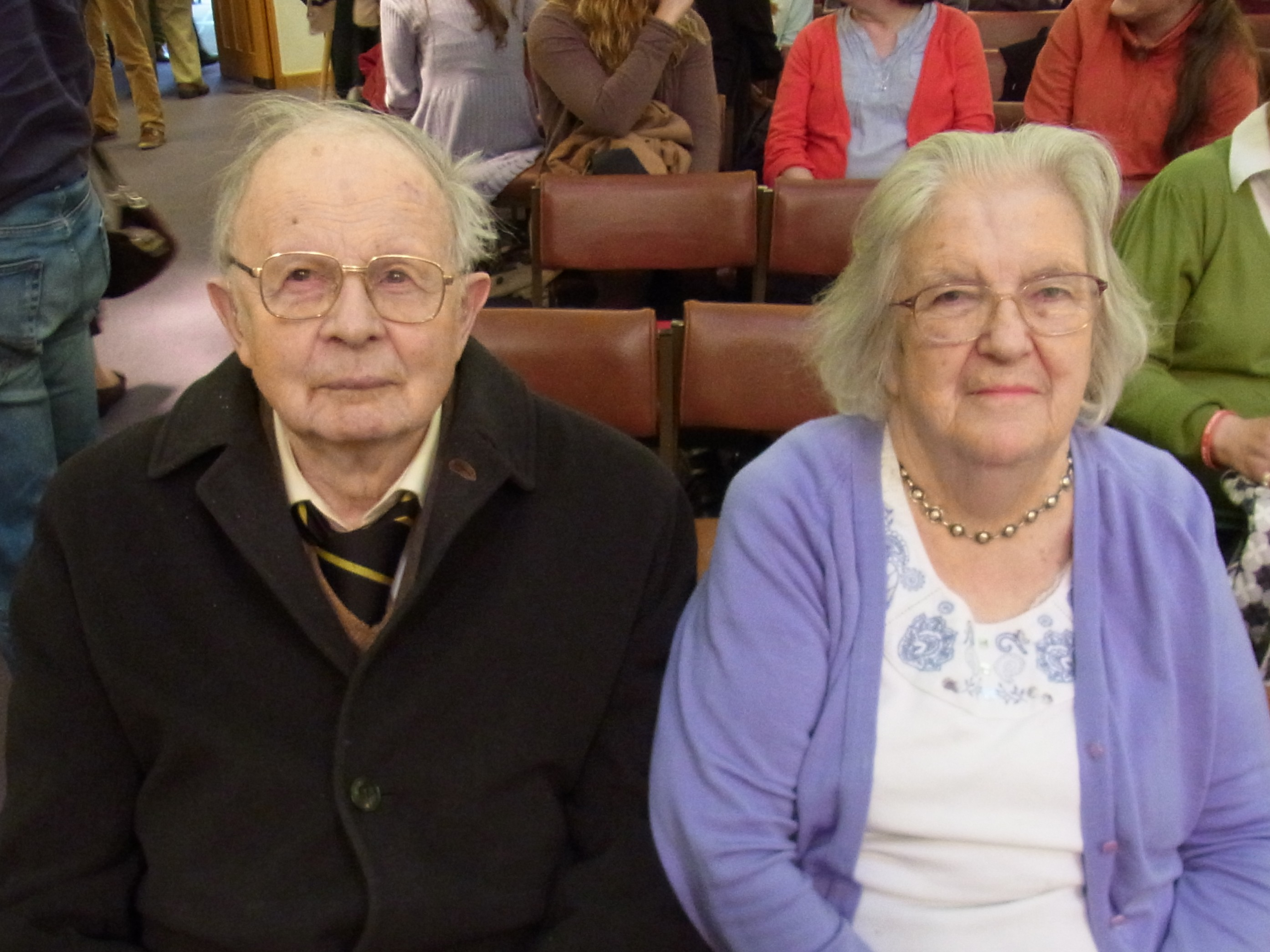
Fred Catherwood and his wife Elizabeth, in 2012

He married Elizabeth, the daughter of Christian pastor and author Martyn Lloyd-Jones. The Catherwoods had two sons and a daughter. Their son Christopher Catherwood is an author. Their daughter, Bethan Marshall, is a university lecturer, and younger son Jonathan is Director of the Martyn Lloyd Jones Trust.

Sir Fred Catherwood died in Cambridge, England on 30 November 2014 at the age of 89.

== Bibliography ==
Catherwood authored many books and hundreds of articles in a range of journals. He described the requirements of responsible management and good industrial relations. His books include:

- The Christian in Industrial Society, 1964, rev. edn 1980 (On the Job, USA, 1983);
- Britain with the Brakes Off, 1966;
- The Christian Citizen, 1969;
- A Better Way, 1976;
- First Things First, 1979;
- God's Time God's Money, 1987;
- Pro Europe?, 1991;
- David: Poet, Warrior, King, 1993;
- At the Cutting Edge (memoirs), 1995;
- Jobs & Justice, Homes & Hope, 1997;
- It Can be Done, 2000;
- The Creation of Wealth: Recovering a Christian Understanding of Money, Work, and Ethics, 2002

== Obituaries and tributes ==
- The Guardian obituary written by Stephen Bates.
- The Times obituary
- Fulcrum tribute, written by Elaine Storkey
- IFESworld tribute, written by Penny Vinden.
