= Derek Prag =

British Member of the European Parliament for Hertfordshire

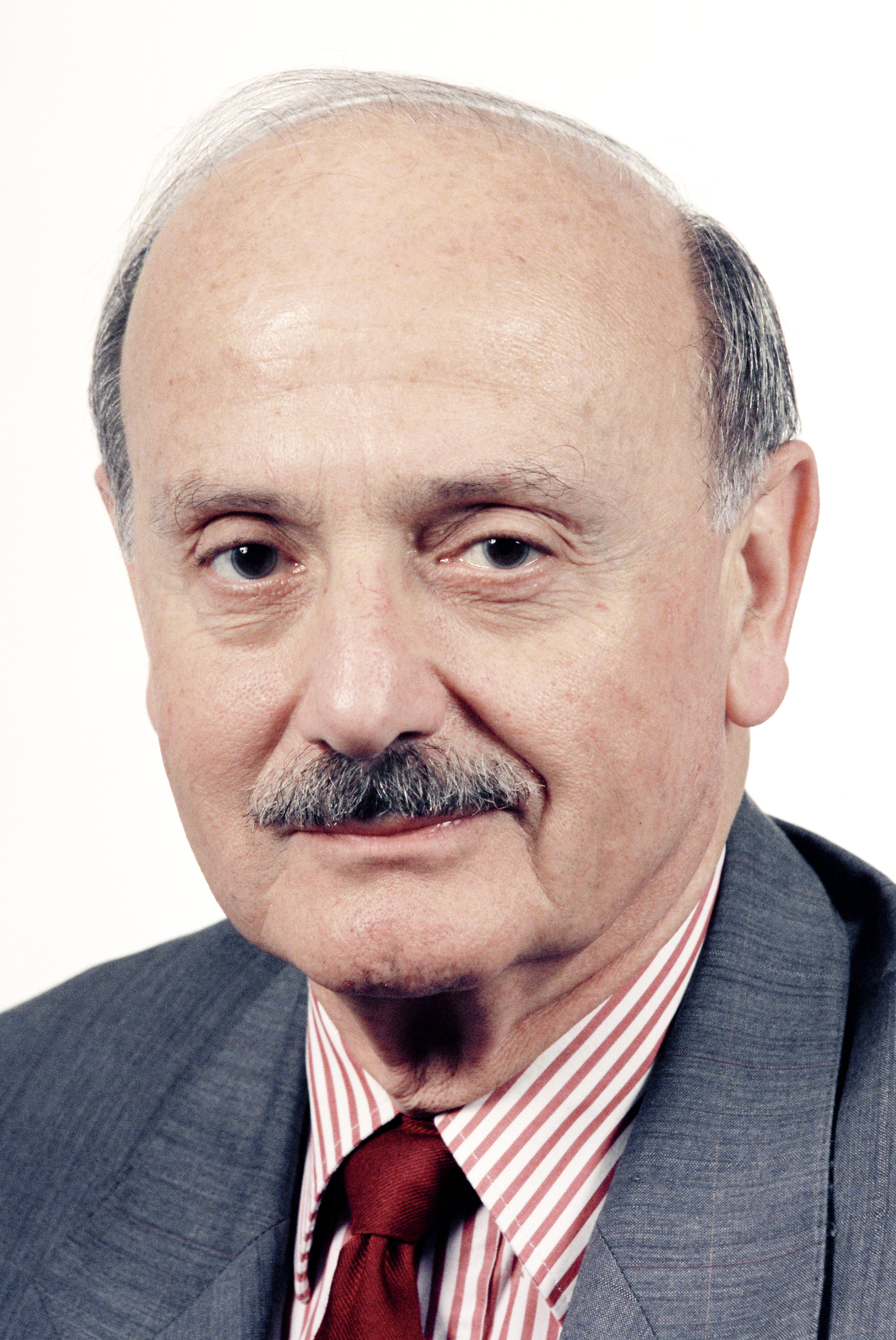

Personal details
- Born: 6 August 1923 Merthyr Tydfil, Glamorgan, Wales
- Died: 20 January 2010 (aged 86)
- Party: Conservative
- Spouse: Dora (1925–2010)
- Education: Emmanuel College, Cambridge

Derek Prag (6 August 1923 – 20 January 2010) was a British Member of the European Parliament for Hertfordshire from 1979 to 1994. He represented the UK Conservative Party (UK), which affiliated within the European Parliament initially with the European Democrats and, as of 1992, the European People's Party. Prag was briefly Chair of the Parliament's Committee on Institutional Affairs from June to July 1993.

Prag was born in Merthyr Tydfil, Glamorgan, Wales and attended Bolton School in Lancashire from 1934 to 1941 then read Modern Languages at Emmanuel College, Cambridge. He had a career in journalism before going to work for the European Union. In 1948 he married Dora, with whom he was joint patron of the European Union Youth Orchestra. He had three sons: Nicholas, Stephen and Jonathan.

Previously Prag had been the first head of the European Commission office in London, and for many years he was chairman of the London Europe Society. He served on the board of EUbusiness, a business information service about the European Union.

Derek Prag died in January 2010 from a heart attack, aged 86.
