= 1994 European Parliament election in the United Kingdom =

- 9 June 1994

87 seats to the European Parliament
- Turnout: 36.4%
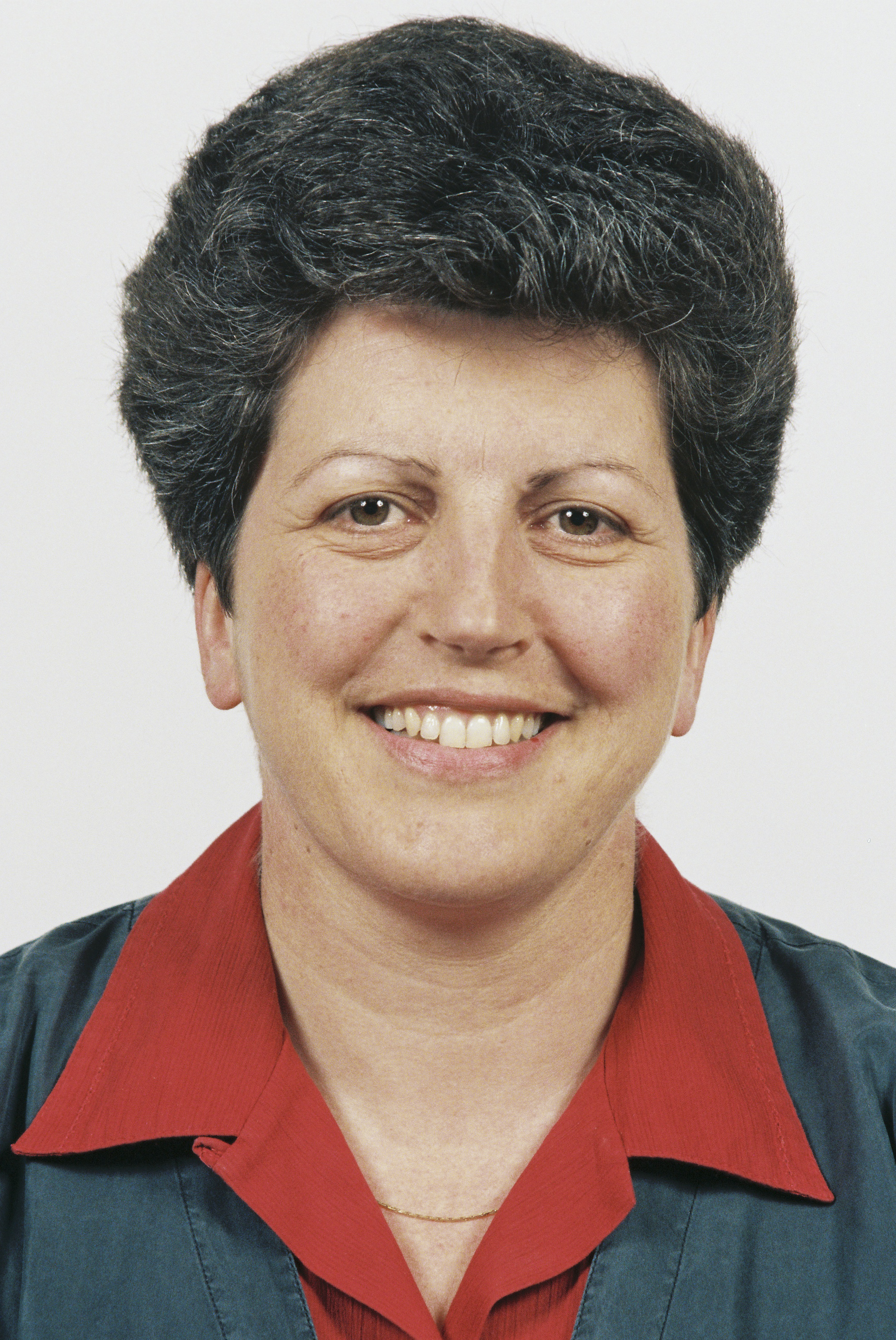

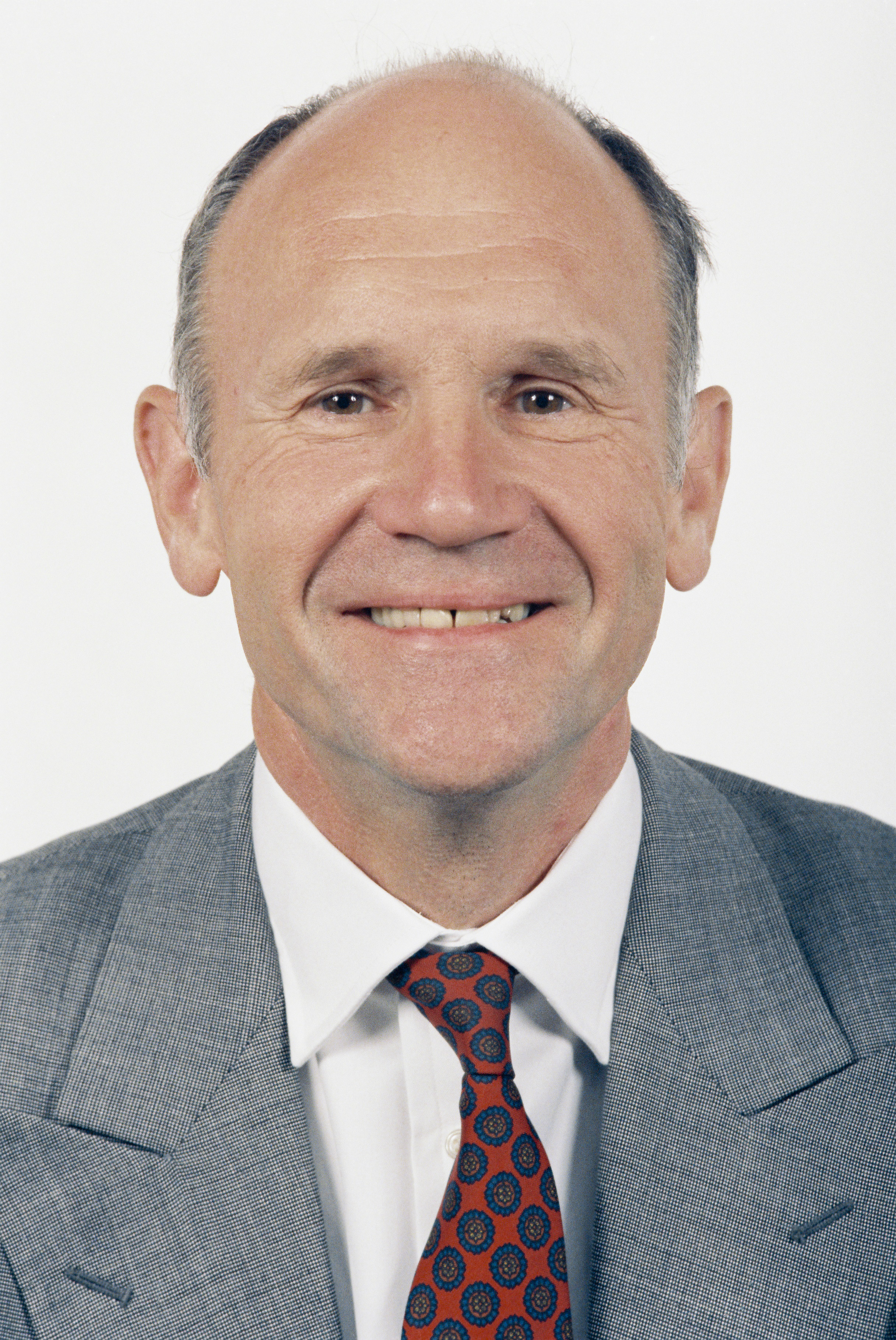

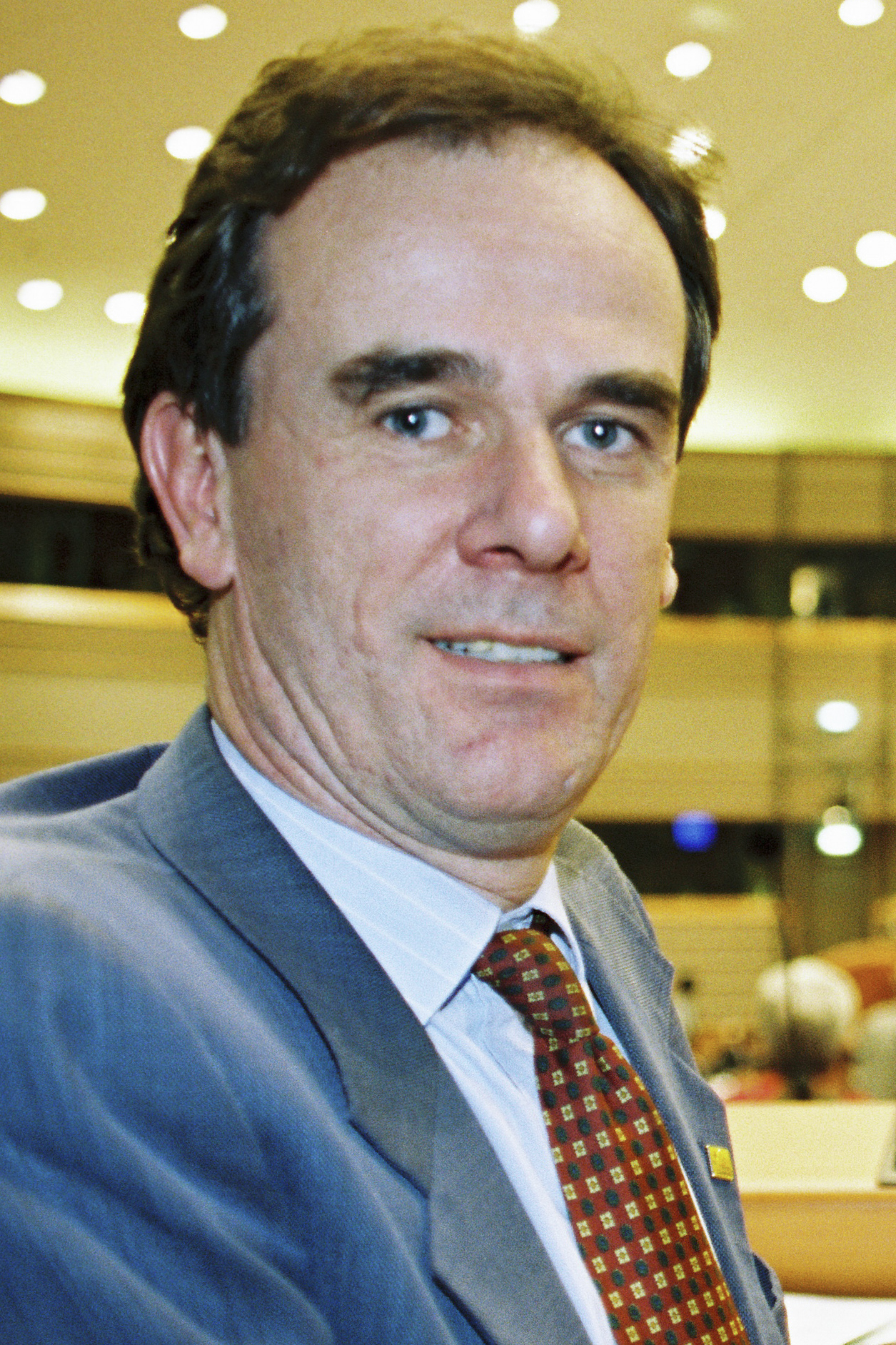

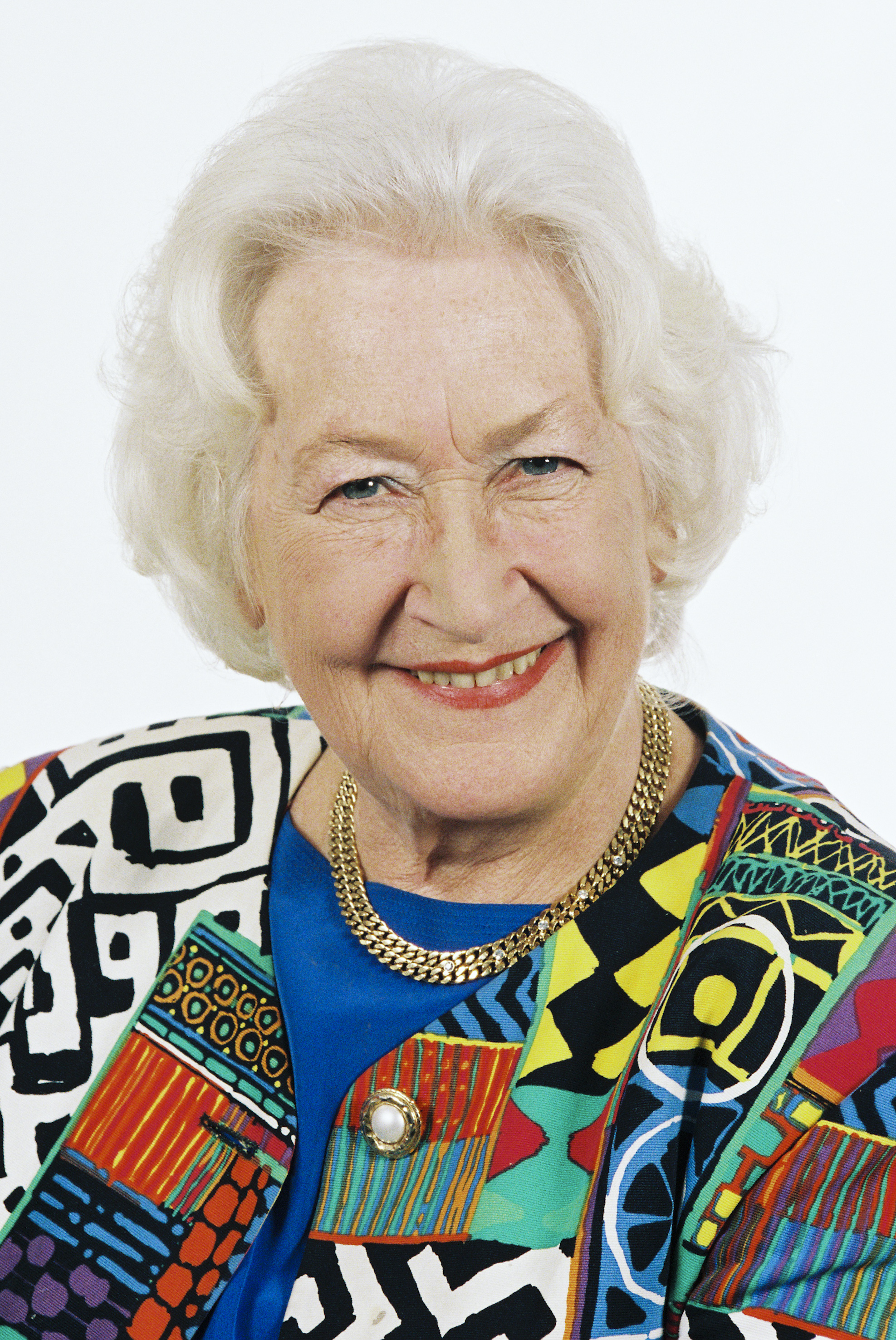
	First party	Second party
Leader	Pauline Green	Christopher Prout
Party	Labour	Conservative
Alliance	PES	EPP
Leader's seat	London North	Herefordshire and Shropshire (defeated)
Last election	45 seats, 38.7%	32 seats, 33.7%
Seats won	62	18
Seat change	▲17	▼13
Popular vote	6,753,881	4,274,122
Percentage	42.6%	26.8%
Swing	▲3.9%	▼6.7%
	Third party	Fourth party
Leader	Robin Teverson	Winnie Ewing
Party	Liberal Democrats	SNP
Alliance	ALDE	EFA
Leader's seat	Ran in Cornwall and West Plymouth (won)	Highlands and Islands
Last election	0 seats, 5.9%	1 seat, 2.6%
Seats won	2	2
Seat change	▲2	▲1
Popular vote	2,557,887	487,237
Percentage	16.1%	3.1%
Swing	▲10.2%	▲0.5%
- Colours denote the winning party, as shown in the main table of results.

Leader of Largest Party before election
Margaret Beckett
Labour
Subsequent Leader of Largest Party
Margaret Beckett
Labour

The 1994 European Parliament election was the fourth European election to be held in the United Kingdom. It was held on Thursday 9 June, though, as usual, the ballots were not counted until the evening of Sunday 12 June. The electoral system was, for the final European election, first past the post in England, Scotland and Wales and single transferable vote in Northern Ireland. This was the first election with 87 MEPs, the European Parliamentary Elections Act 1993 having increased the number of seats for the UK from 81. For the first time, the UK did not have the lowest turnout in Europe. Turnout was lower in the Netherlands and Portugal.

This was the first European election contested by the recently formed UK Independence Party (UKIP), and the first European election in which the Liberal Democrats won seats. The Green Party lost more than three-quarters of the votes they secured in the previous election. The Conservatives lost 14 seats, taking their number of seats down to 18, which was 42 fewer seats than in the 1979 election, the year they defeated the Labour Party in the 1979 General Election. This reflected the general unpopularity of the Major government at the time.

Five by-elections to the British Parliament also took place on the same day in the Barking, Bradford South, Dagenham, Eastleigh, and Newham North East constituencies. The Conservatives lost Eastleigh to the Liberal Democrats; Labour would hold the other four.

Labour was under the interim leadership of Margaret Beckett following the sudden death of leader John Smith the previous month.

== Results ==
=== United Kingdom ===
Sources:

- "European Parliament elections: 1979 to 1994". House of Commons Library.
- United Kingdom election results

Party	Votes won	% of vote	Loss/Gain	Seats	% of seats	Loss/Gain
Labour	6,753,881	42.6	▲3.9	62	71.3	▲17
Conservative	4,274,122	26.8	▼6.7	18	20.7	▼13
Liberal Democrats	2,557,887	16.1	▲10.2	2	2.3	▲2
SNP	487,237	3.1	▲0.5	2	2.3	▲1
Green	471,257	3.0	▼11.5	0	Steady	Steady
DUP	163,246	1.0	Steady	1	1.1	Steady
Plaid Cymru	162,478	1.0	▲0.3	0	Steady	Steady
SDLP	161,992	1.0	▲0.2	1	1.1	Steady
Independent	153,917	1.0	▲0.9	0	Steady	Steady
UKIP	150,251	1.0	New	0	Steady	Steady
UUP	133,459	0.8	▲0.1	1	1.1	Steady
Liberal	100,500	0.6	New	0	Steady	Steady
Natural Law	98,845	0.6	New	0	Steady	Steady
Sinn Féin	55,215	0.3	Steady	0	Steady	Steady
Green	23,304	0.1	New	0	Steady	Steady
Alliance	23,157	0.1	Steady	0	Steady	Steady
National Front	12,469	0.1	▲0.1	0	Steady	Steady
Scottish Militant Labour	12,113	0.1	New	0	Steady	Steady
Literal Democrat	10,203	0.1	New	0	Steady	Steady
Ulster Independence	7,858	0.1	New	0	Steady	Steady
Monster Raving Loony	7,798	0.1	Steady	0	Steady	Steady
Ind. Conservative	5,847	0.0	Steady	0	Steady	Steady
Independent Socialist	5,071	0.0	New	0	Steady	Steady
Communist	4,323	0.0	Steady	0	Steady	Steady
Mebyon Kernow	3,315	0.0	Steady	0	Steady	Steady
Workers' Party	2,543	0.0	Steady	0	Steady	Steady
Labour Party NI	2,464	0.0	Steady	0	Steady	Steady
Other	7,837	0.1	N/A	0	Steady	Steady

Total votes cast – 15,852,589. All parties shown.

=== Great Britain ===
Map of the Scottish results.

Sources:

- "European Parliament elections: 1979 to 1994". House of Commons Library.
- United Kingdom election results

Party	Votes won	% of vote	Loss/Gain	Seats	% of seats	Loss/Gain
Labour	6,753,881	44.2	▲4.1	62	73.8	▲17
Conservative	4,268,539	27.8	▼6.8	18	21.4	▼13
Liberal Democrats	2,557,887	16.7	▲10.6	2	2.4	▲2
SNP	487,237	3.2	▲0.5	2	2.4	▲1
Green	471,257	3.1	▼11.8	0	Steady	Steady
Plaid Cymru	162,478	1.1	▲0.3	0	Steady	Steady
Independent	151,858	1.0	▲0.9	0	Steady	Steady
UKIP	150,251	1.0	New	0	Steady	Steady
Liberal	100,500	0.7	New	0	Steady	Steady
Natural Law	96,554	0.6	New	0	Steady	Steady
Green	23,304	0.2	New	0	Steady	Steady
National Front	12,469	0.1	New	0	Steady	Steady
Scottish Militant Labour	12,113	0.1	New	0	Steady	Steady
Literal Democrat	10,203	0.1	New	0	Steady	Steady
Monster Raving Loony	7,798	0.1	Steady	0	Steady	Steady
Ind. Conservative	5,847	0.0	Steady	0	Steady	Steady
Independent Socialist	5,071	0.0	New	0	Steady	Steady
Communist	4,323	0.0	Steady	0	Steady	Steady
Mebyon Kernow	3,315	0.0	Steady	0	Steady	Steady
Other	7,837	0.1	N/A	0	Steady	Steady

Total votes cast – 15,292,722. All parties shown.

=== Northern Ireland ===
Map of Northern Irish results

European Parliament election, 1994 (United Kingdom): Northern Ireland – 3 seats
Party	Candidate	FPv%	Count	
Party	Candidate	FPv%	1	2
DUP	Ian Paisley	29.2	163,246	
SDLP	John Hume	28.9	161,992	
UUP	Jim Nicholson	23.8	133,459	149,541.25
Alliance	Mary Clark-Glass	4.1	23,157	23,375.55
Sinn Féin	Tom Hartley	3.8	21,273	21,278.10
Sinn Féin	Dodie McGuinness	3.1	17,195	17,238.95
Sinn Féin	Francie Molloy	3.0	16,747	16.756.60
Ulster Independence	Hugh Ross	1.4	7,858	12,575.05
NI Conservatives	Myrtle Boal	1.0	5,583	6,106.95
Workers' Party	John Lowry	0.5	2,543	2,579.00
Labour Party NI	Niall Cusack	0.4	2,464	2,518.90
Natural Law	James Anderson	0.2	1,418	1,492.70
Independent	June Campion	0.2	1,088	1,127.15
Independent	David Kerr	0.1	571	877.15
Natural Law	Susannah Thompson	0.1	454	534.40
Independent	Robert Mooney	0.1	400	455.95
Natural Law	Michael Kennedy	0.1	419	443.90
Electorate: 1,151,389 Valid: 559,867 Spoilt: 9,234 Quota: 139,967 Turnout: 49.4%

- Note 1: Campion's candidacy, with the ballot paper description 'Peace Coalition', was supported by Democratic Left, the Greens and some Labour groups.
- Note 2: Kerr appeared on the ballot paper with the description Independence for Ulster.
- Note 3: Mooney appeared on the ballot paper with the description Constitutional Independent Northern Ireland.

== MEPs retiring ==
=== Conservative ===
- Peter Beazley (Bedfordshire South)
- Sir Fred Catherwood (Cambridge & Bedfordshire North)
- Derek Prag (Hertfordshire)
- Madron Seligman (Sussex West)

=== Labour ===
- John Bird (Midlands West)
- Janey Buchan (Glasgow)
- Geoff Hoon (Derbyshire)

== MEPs defeated ==
=== Labour ===
- Henry McCubbin (North East Scotland)

=== Conservative ===
- Christopher Beazley (Cornwall and Plymouth)
- Nicholas Bethell, 4th Baron Bethell (London North West)
- Margaret Daly (Somerset and North Devon)
- Richard Fletcher-Vane, 2nd Baron Inglewood (Cumbria and Lancashire North)
- Paul Howell (Norfolk)
- Christopher Jackson (Kent East)
- Bill Newton Dunn (Lincolnshire)
- Ben Patterson (Kent West)
- Peter Price (London South East)
- Christopher Prout (Herefordshire and Shropshire)
- Patricia Rawlings (Essex West and Hertfordshire East)
- Anthony Simpson (Northamptonshire and Blaby)
- Amédée Turner (Suffolk)
- Michael Welsh (Central Lancashire)

== See also ==
- Elections in the United Kingdom: European elections
- List of members of the European Parliament for the United Kingdom (1994–1999)
