= 1984 European Parliament election in the United Kingdom =

- 14 June 1984

81 seats to the European Parliament
- Turnout: 32.6% (▲0.2%)
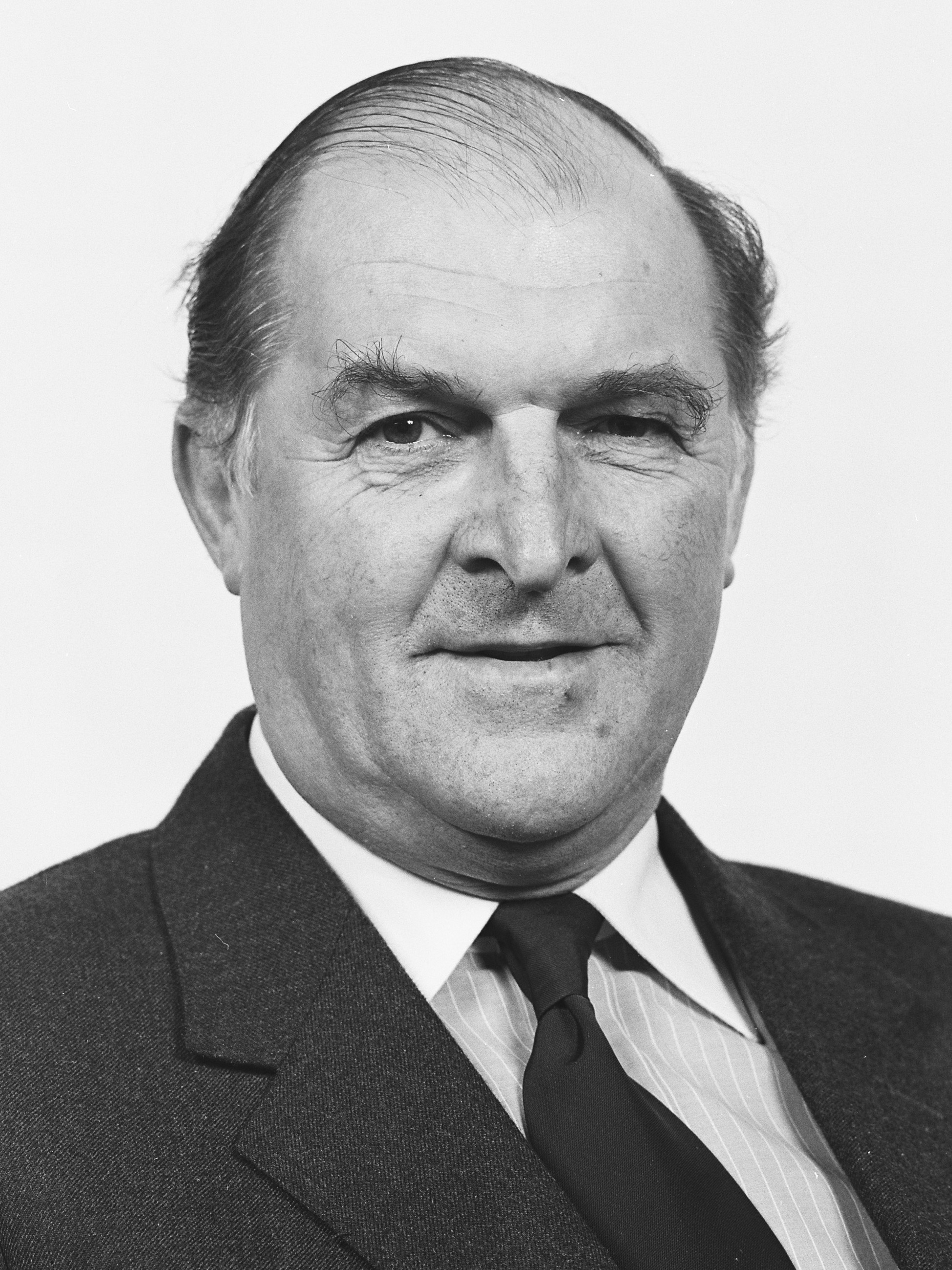

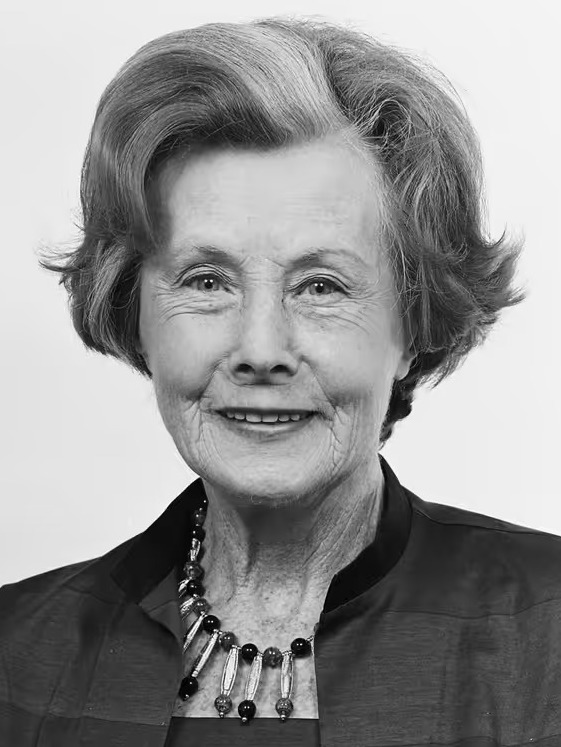
| | First party | Second party |
|---|---|---|
| Leader | Henry Plumb | Barbara Castle |
| Party | Conservative | Labour |
| Alliance | EPP | PES |
| Leader's seat | Cotswolds | Greater Manchester West |
| Last election | 60 seats, 48.4% | 17 seats, 31.6% |
| Seats won | 45 | 32 |
| Seat change | ▼15 | ▲15 |
| Popular vote | 5,426,866 | 4,865,224 |
| Percentage | 38.8% | 34.8% |
| Swing | ▼9.6% | ▲3.1% |
- Colours denote the winning party, as shown in the main table of results.

The 1984 European Parliament election was the second European election to be held in the United Kingdom. It was held on 14 June. The electoral system was First Past the Post in England, Scotland and Wales and Single transferable vote in Northern Ireland. The turnout was again the lowest in Europe. In England, Scotland and Wales, the Liberal Party and Social Democratic Party were in alliance, collecting 2,591,635 votes but not a single seat.

The election represented a small recovery for Labour, under Michael Foot's replacement Neil Kinnock, taking 15 seats from the Conservatives. In the general election of 1983, they had only had a vote share of 2% more than the SDP–Liberal Alliance (although they had nearly 10 times more MP's elected) and 15% less than the Conservatives. This was the last European election in the UK in which the governing party won either the greatest number of seats or the highest vote share.

A by-election to the British Parliament also took place on the same day in the Portsmouth South constituency – the Alliance gained the seat from the Conservatives.

== Results ==
=== United Kingdom ===
| Party | Votes won | % of vote | Loss/Gain | Seats | % of seats | Loss/Gain |
|---|---|---|---|---|---|---|
| Conservative | 5,426,866 | 38.8 | ▼9.6 | 45 | 55.6 | ▼15 |
| Labour | 4,865,224 | 34.8 | ▲3.1 | 32 | 39.5 | ▲15 |
| Alliance | 2,591,659 | 18.5 | ▲5.9 | 0 | Steady | Steady |
| SNP | 230,594 | 1.6 | ▼0.2 | 1 | 1.2 | Steady |
| DUP | 230,251 | 1.6 | ▲0.4 | 1 | 1.2 | Steady |
| SDLP | 151,399 | 1.1 | Steady | 1 | 1.2 | Steady |
| UUP | 147,169 | 1.1 | ▲0.1 | 1 | 1.2 | Steady |
| Plaid Cymru | 103,031 | 0.8 | ▲0.1 | 0 | Steady | Steady |
| Sinn Féin | 91,476 | 0.7 | New | 0 | Steady | Steady |
| Ecology | 73,025 | 0.5 | ▲0.4 | 0 | Steady | Steady |
| Alliance | 34,046 | 0.2 | Steady | 0 | Steady | Steady |
| UPUP | 20,092 | 0.1 | New | 0 | Steady | Steady |
| Independent | 11,073 | 0.1 | ▼0.1 | 0 | Steady | Steady |
| Workers' Party | 8,712 | 0.1 | Steady | 0 | Steady | Steady |
| Independent Ecology | 3,330 | 0.0 | New | 0 | Steady | Steady |
| Ind. Conservative | 3,249 | 0.0 | Steady | 0 | Steady | Steady |
| Ind. Liberal | 2,981 | 0.0 | New | 0 | Steady | Steady |
| Wessex Regionalists | 2,365 | 0.0 | New | 0 | Steady | Steady |
| Cornish Nationalist | 1,892 | 0.0 | New | 0 | Steady | Steady |
| Federal Republican Party | 1,494 | 0.0 | New | 0 | Steady | Steady |

- Overall (England, Scotland, Wales and Northern Ireland) turnout: 32.6% (EC average: 61%)
- Overall votes cast: 13,998,190

=== Great Britain ===
| Party | Votes won | % of vote | Loss/Gain | Seats | % of seats | Loss/Gain |
|---|---|---|---|---|---|---|
| Conservative | 5,426,866 | 40.8 | ▼9.8 | 45 | 57.7 | ▼15 |
| Labour | 4,865,224 | 36.5 | ▲3.5 | 32 | 41.0 | ▲15 |
| Alliance | 2,591,659 | 19.5 | ▲6.3 | 0 | Steady | Steady |
| SNP | 230,594 | 1.7 | ▼0.2 | 1 | 1.3 | Steady |
| Plaid Cymru | 103,031 | 0.8 | ▲0.1 | 0 | Steady | Steady |
| Ecology | 70,853 | 0.5 | ▲0.4 | 0 | Steady | Steady |
| Independent | 11,073 | 0.1 | ▼0.1 | 0 | Steady | Steady |
| Independent Ecology | 3,330 | 0.0 | New | 0 | Steady | Steady |
| Ind. Conservative | 3,249 | 0.0 | Steady | 0 | Steady | Steady |
| Ind. Liberal | 2,981 | 0.0 | New | 0 | Steady | Steady |
| Wessex Regionalists | 2,365 | 0.0 | New | 0 | Steady | Steady |
| Cornish Nationalist | 1,892 | 0.0 | New | 0 | Steady | Steady |
| Federal Republican Party | 1,494 | 0.0 | New | 0 | Steady | Steady |

Total votes cast – 13,312,898. All parties listed.

=== Northern Ireland ===
1984 European Parliament election: Northern Ireland
| Party | Candidate | FPv% | Count | | | |
| Party | Candidate | FPv% | 1 | 2 | 3 | 4 |
|---|---|---|---|---|---|---|
| DUP | Ian Paisley | 33.6 | 230,251 | | | |
| UUP | John Taylor | 21.5 | 147,169 | 185,714 | | |
| SDLP | John Hume | 22.1 | 151,399 | 151,664 | 156,310 | 183,256 |
| Sinn Féin | Danny Morrison | 13.3 | 91,476 | 91,525 | 92,644 | 93,079 |
| Alliance | David Cook | 5.0 | 34,046 | 34,892 | 37,401 | |
| UPUP | James Kilfedder | 2.9 | 20,092 | 38,293 | 38,854 | |
| Workers' Party | Seamus Lynch | 1.3 | 8,712 | 8,813 | | |
| Ecology | Colin McGuigan | 0.3 | 2,172 | 2,236 | | |
Electorate: 1,065,363 Valid: 685,317 Spoilt: 11,654 Quota: 171,330 Turnout: 696,994

=== Constituency results ===
| Constituency | Constituency result by party | | | | | | | Winning party 1984 |
| Constituency | Conservative | Labour | Alliance | PC | SNP | Ecology | Others | Winning party 1984 |
|---|---|---|---|---|---|---|---|---|
| Bedfordshire South | 72,088 | 57,106 | 36,444 | | | | | Conservative |
| Birmingham East | 54,994 | 76,377 | 21,927 | | | | 1,440 | Labour |
| Birmingham West | 55,702 | 61,946 | 19,422 | | | | | Labour |
| Bristol | 94,652 | 77,008 | 33,698 | | | | | Conservative |
| Cambridge and Bedfordshire North | 86,117 | 38,901 | 36,341 | | | | | Conservative |
| Cheshire East | 71,182 | 52,806 | 31,374 | | | | | Conservative |
| Cheshire West | 74,579 | 64,887 | 30,470 | | | | | Conservative |
| Cleveland and Yorkshire North | 73,217 | 52,887 | 31,374 | | | | | Conservative |
| Cornwall and Plymouth | 81,627 | 35,952 | 63,876 | | | | 10,518 | Conservative |
| Cotswolds | 94,740 | 36,738 | 45,798 | | | | | Conservative |
| Cumbria and Lancashire North | 86,127 | 62,332 | 39,622 | | | | | Conservative |
| Derbyshire | 72,613 | 79,466 | 30,824 | | | | | Labour |
| Devon | 110,129 | 30,017 | 53,519 | | | | 7,278 | Conservative |
| Dorset East and Hampshire West | 109,072 | 31,223 | 49,181 | | | | | Conservative |
| Durham | 44,846 | 106,073 | 32,307 | | | | | Labour |
| Essex North East | 97,138 | 42,836 | 34,769 | | | | | Conservative |
| Essex South West | 72,190 | 56,169 | 29,385 | | | | | Conservative |
| Glasgow | 25,282 | 91,015 | 20,867 | | 16,456 | | | Labour |
| Greater Manchester Central | 48,753 | 76,830 | 24,192 | | | | 1,430 | Labour |
| Greater Manchester East | 56,415 | 65,101 | 27,801 | | | 3,158 | | Labour |
| Greater Manchester West | 56,042 | 93,740 | 17,894 | | | | | Labour |
| Hampshire Central | 84,086 | 39,228 | 39,265 | | | | | Conservative |
| Hereford and Worcester | 84,077 | 44,143 | 37,854 | | | 8,179 | | Conservative |
| Hertfordshire | 87,603 | 41,671 | 40,877 | | | | | Conservative |
| Highlands and Islands | 18,847 | 16,644 | 33,133 | | 49,410 | | | SNP |
| Humberside | 61,952 | 53,937 | 27,318 | | | | | Conservative |
| Kent East | 92,340 | 43,473 | 34,601 | | | 5,405 | | Conservative |
| Kent West | 85,414 | 50,784 | 33,306 | | | 4,991 | | Conservative |
| Lancashire Central | 82,370 | 56,175 | 24,936 | | | | | Conservative |
| Lancashire East | 67,806 | 75,711 | 26,320 | | | | | Labour |
| Leeds | 60,178 | 70,535 | 36,097 | | | | | Labour |
| Leicester | 72,508 | 69,616 | 29,656 | | | | 3,249 | Conservative |
| Lincolnshire | 92,606 | 47,161 | 37,244 | | | | | Conservative |
| London Central | 64,545 | 77,842 | 30,269 | | | | 7,514 | Labour |
| London East | 61,711 | 73,870 | 26,379 | | | | | Labour |
| London North | 74,846 | 69,993 | 31,344 | | | | 4,682 | Conservative |
| London North East | 27,242 | 79,907 | 17,344 | | | | 4,797 | Labour |
| London North West | 69,803 | 62,381 | 29,609 | | | | | Conservative |
| London South and Surrey East | 82,122 | 37,465 | 34,522 | | | | | Conservative |
| London South East | 81,508 | 61,493 | 38,614 | | | | 989 | Conservative |
| London South Inner | 46,180 | 77,661 | 25,391 | | | | 3,281 | Labour |
| London South West | 41,096 | 32,632 | 23,842 | | | | 2,135 | Conservative |
| London West | 74,325 | 79,554 | 36,687 | | | | 4,361 | Labour |
| Lothians | 49,065 | 74,989 | 36,636 | | 22,331 | | 2,560 | Labour |
| Merseyside East | 38,047 | 87,086 | 17,259 | | | | | Labour |
| Merseyside West | 52,718 | 65,915 | 37,303 | | | | | Labour |
| Mid and West Wales | 52,910 | 89,362 | 35,168 | 32,880 | | | 4,266 | Labour |
| Mid Scotland and Fife | 52,872 | 80,038 | 24,220 | | 30,511 | | | Labour |
| Midlands East | 67,884 | 55,155 | 27,912 | | | | 1,494 | Conservative |
| Midlands West | 54,406 | 74,091 | 17,709 | | | | | Labour |
| Norfolk | 95,459 | 58,602 | 37,703 | | | | | Conservative |
| North East Scotland | 53,809 | 44,648 | 25,490 | | 33,448 | | | Conservative |
| North Wales | 69,139 | 54,768 | 56,861 | 38,117 | | | | Conservative |
| Northamptonshire | 88,668 | 48,809 | 37,421 | | | | 3,330 | Conservative |
| Northumbria | 62,717 | 78,412 | 42,946 | | | | | Labour |
| Nottingham | 82,500 | 66,374 | 33,169 | | | | | Conservative |
| Oxfordshire and Buckinghamshire | 94,136 | 39,164 | 45,055 | | | | | Conservative |
| Sheffield | 47,247 | 93,530 | 23,935 | | | | | Labour |
| Shropshire and Stafford | 82,291 | 57,359 | 37,209 | | | | | Conservative |
| Somerset and Dorset West | 98,928 | 36,863 | 58,677 | | | | | Conservative |
| South of Scotland | 60,843 | 57,706 | 23,598 | | 22,242 | | | Conservative |
| South Wales | 55,678 | 99,936 | 26,588 | 13,201 | | | | Labour |
| South Wales East | 36,359 | 131,916 | 28,330 | 18,833 | | | | Labour |
| Staffordshire East | 68,886 | 76,753 | 26,093 | | | | | Labour |
| Strathclyde East | 24,857 | 90,792 | 11,883 | | 27,330 | | | Labour |
| Strathclyde West | 47,196 | 70,234 | 25,955 | | 28,866 | | | Labour |
| Suffolk | 88,243 | 41,145 | 34,084 | | | | | Conservative |
| Surrey West | 96,675 | 22,531 | 44,087 | | | | | Conservative |
| Sussex East | 102,287 | 32,213 | 36,666 | | | 5,401 | | Conservative |
| Sussex West | 104,257 | 22,857 | 46,755 | | | 3,842 | | Conservative |
| Thames Valley | 74,928 | 36,123 | 32,704 | | | | | Conservative |
| Tyne and Wear | 39,610 | 89,024 | 19,081 | | | | | Labour |
| Wight and Hampshire East | 96,666 | 36,445 | 53,738 | | | | | Conservative |
| Wiltshire | 86,873 | 35,457 | 60,404 | | | | | Conservative |
| York | 80,636 | 44,234 | 33,356 | | | | | Conservative |
| Yorkshire South | 30,271 | 98,020 | 19,306 | | | | | Labour |
| Yorkshire South West | 44,291 | 88,464 | 26,964 | | | | | Labour |
| Yorkshire West | 65,405 | 86,259 | 28,709 | | | | | Labour |

== See also ==
- Elections in the United Kingdom: European elections
- List of members of the European Parliament for the United Kingdom (1984–1989)
