= 1989 European Parliament election in the United Kingdom =

- 15 June 1989

81 seats to the European Parliament
- Turnout: 36.4% (▲3.8%)
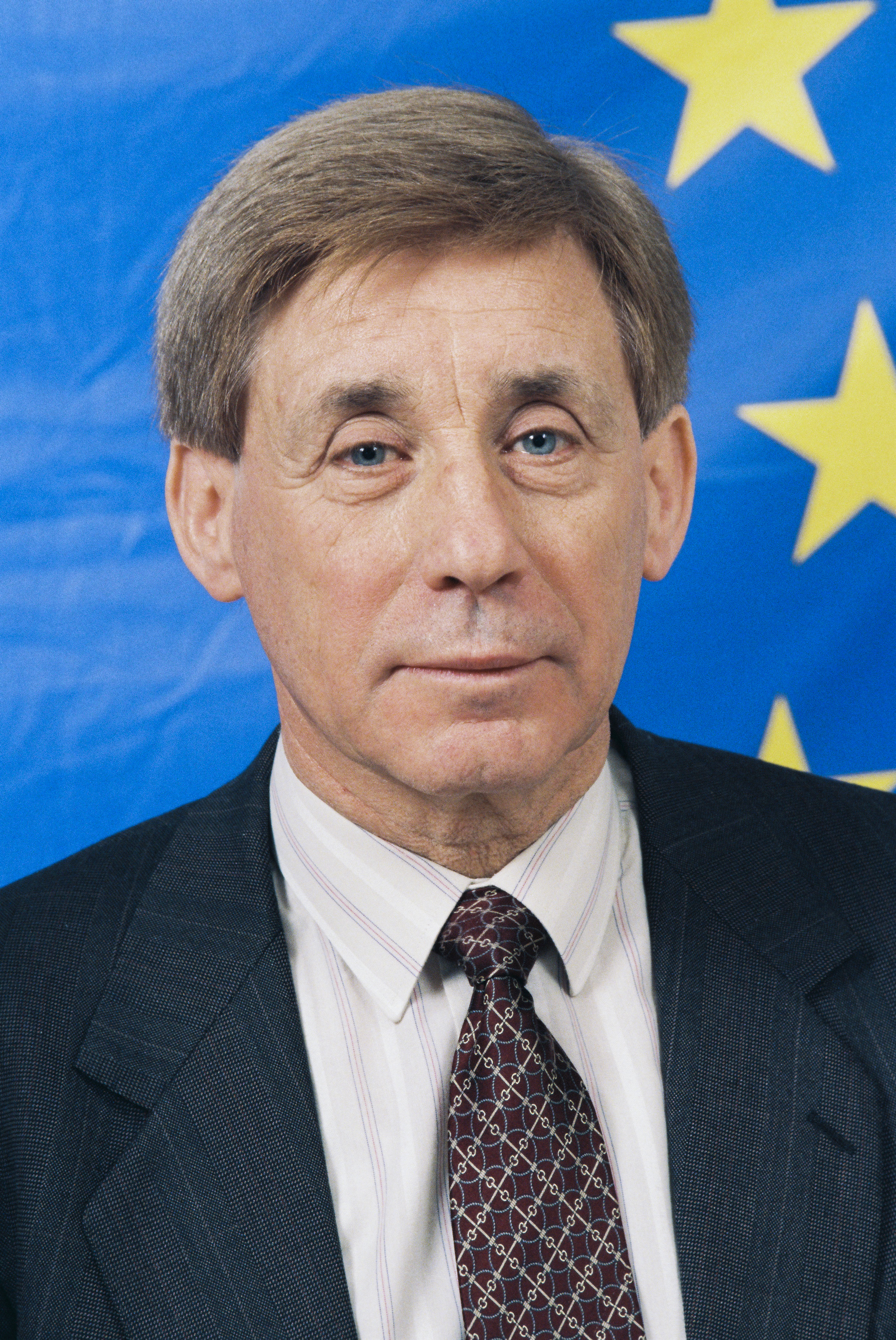

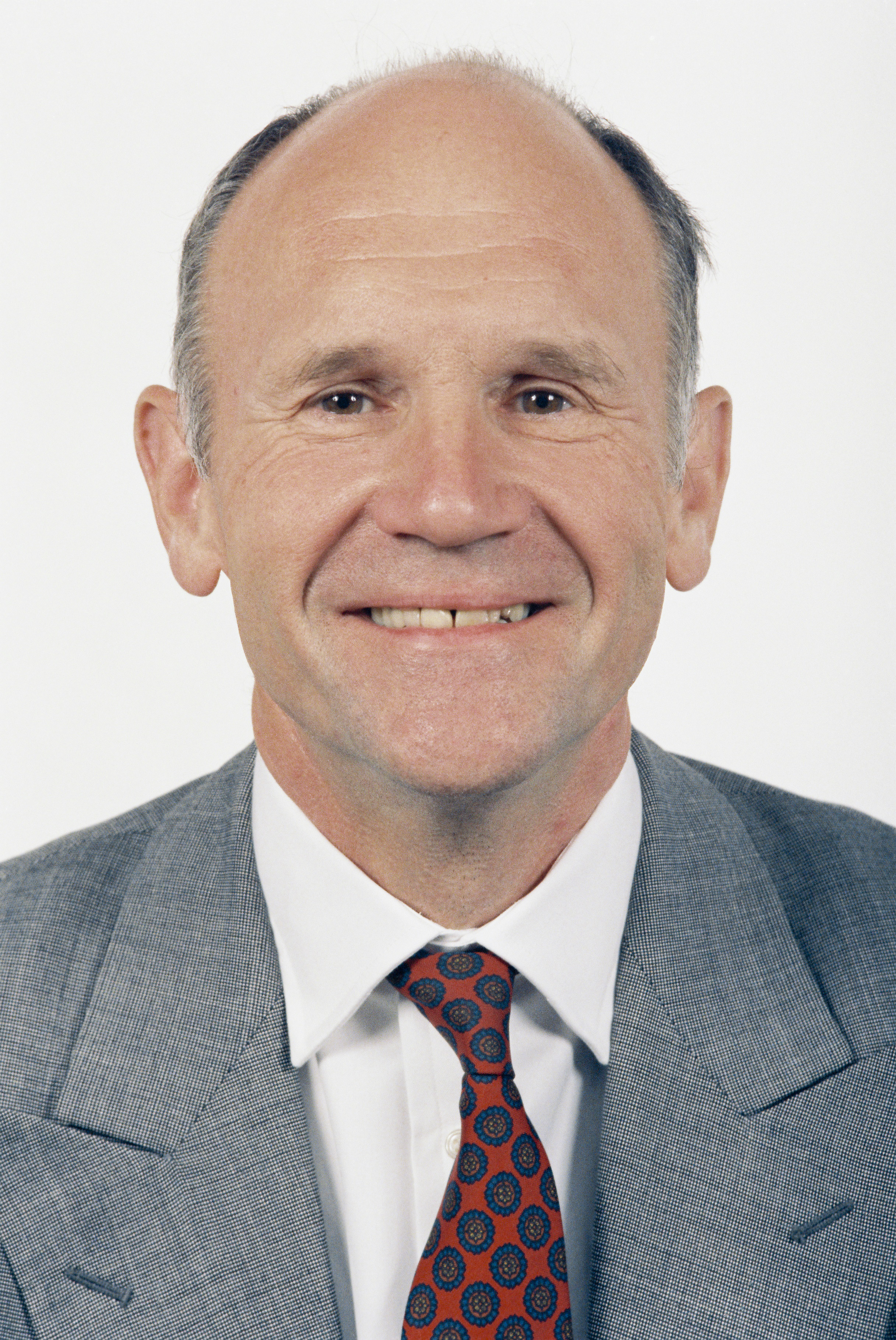
	First party	Second party
Leader	Barry Seal	Christopher Prout
Party	Labour	Conservative
Alliance	PES	EPP
Leader's seat	Yorkshire West	Shropshire and Stafford
Last election	32 seats, 34.8%	45 seats, 38.8%
Seats won	45	32
Seat change	▲13	▼13
Popular vote	6,153,640	5,331,077
Percentage	38.7%	33.7%
Swing	▲3.9%	▼5.1%
- Colours denote the winning party, as shown in the main table of results.

The 1989 European Parliament election, was the third European election to be held in the United Kingdom. It was held on 15 June. The electoral system was first-past-the-post voting in England, Scotland and Wales and single transferable vote in Northern Ireland. The turnout was again the lowest in Europe.

This election saw the best performance ever by the Green Party (formerly the Ecology Party), collecting over 2 million votes and 15% of the vote share. It had only received 70,853 as the Ecology Party in the previous election. However, because of the first-past-the-post system, the Green Party did not gain a single MEP, while the Scottish National Party received 1 seat with only 3% of the vote share. The Green Party's vote total of 2,299,287 remains its best performance in a national election, as does its percentage result of 14.5%.

The election also saw Labour overtake the Conservatives for the first time in any election since October 1974 and the first time ever in a European election, winning 13 more seats.

Two by-elections to the British Parliament also took place on the same day in the Vauxhall and Glasgow Central constituencies; Labour held both seats.

== Results ==
=== United Kingdom ===
Party	Votes won	% of vote	Loss/Gain	Seats	% of seats	Loss/Gain
Labour	6,153,661	38.7	▲3.9	45	55.6	▲13
Conservative	5,356,887	33.7	▼5.1	32	39.5	▼13
Green	2,299,287	14.5	▲14.0	0	Steady	Steady
SLD	944,861	5.9	▼12.6	0	Steady	Steady
SNP	406,686	2.6	▲1.0	1	1.2	Steady
DUP	160,110	1.0	▼0.6	1	1.2	Steady
SDLP	136,335	0.9	▼0.2	1	1.2	Steady
UUP	118,785	0.7	▼0.4	1	1.2	Steady
Plaid Cymru	115,062	0.7	▼0.1	0	Steady	Steady
SDP	75,886	0.5	New	0	Steady	Steady
Sinn Féin	48,914	0.3	▼0.4	0	Steady	Steady
Alliance	27,905	0.2	Steady	0	Steady	Steady
Independent	12,724	0.1	Steady	0	Steady	Steady
Ind. Conservative	6,996	0.0	Steady	0	Steady	Steady
Workers' Party	5,590	0.0	▼0.1	0	Steady	Steady
Labour Representation Group	3,540	0.0	New	0	Steady	Steady
Communist	4,420	0.0	New	0	Steady	Steady
Monster Raving Loony	4,263	0.0	New	0	Steady	Steady
Mebyon Kernow	4,224	0.0	New	0	Steady	Steady
Wessex Regionalists	2,332	0.0	Steady	0	Steady	Steady
International Communist	1,567	0.0	New	0	Steady	Steady
National Front	1,471	0.0	New	0	Steady	Steady
Humanist	1,349	0.0	New	0	Steady	Steady
Labour Party NI	1,274	0.0	New	0	Steady	Steady
Socialist (GB)	919	0.0	New	0	Steady	Steady
Corrective	707	0.0	New	0	Steady	Steady
Communist League	323	0.0	New	0	Steady	Steady

- Overall (England, Scotland, Wales and Northern Ireland) turnout: 36% (EU average: 59%)
- Overall votes cast: 15,896,078

=== Great Britain ===
Party	Votes won	% of vote	Loss/Gain	Seats	% of seats	Loss/Gain
Labour	6,153,661	40.1	▲3.6	45	57.7	▲13
Conservative	5,331,098	34.7	▼6.1	32	41.0	▼13
Green	2,292,718	14.9	▲14.4	0	Steady	Steady
SLD	944,861	6.2	▼13.3	0	Steady	Steady
SNP	406,686	2.6	▲0.9	1	1.3	Steady
Plaid Cymru	115,062	0.7	▼0.1	0	Steady	Steady
SDP	75,886	0.5	New	0	Steady	Steady
Independent	12,724	0.1	Steady	0	Steady	Steady
Ind. Conservative	6,996	0.0	Steady	0	Steady	Steady
Communist	4,420	0.0	New	0	Steady	Steady
Monster Raving Loony	4,263	0.0	New	0	Steady	Steady
Mebyon Kernow	4,224	0.0	New	0	Steady	Steady
Wessex Regionalists	2,332	0.0	Steady	0	Steady	Steady
International Communist	1,567	0.0	New	0	Steady	Steady
National Front	1,471	0.0	New	0	Steady	Steady
Humanist	1,349	0.0	New	0	Steady	Steady
Socialist (GB)	919	0.0	New	0	Steady	Steady
Corrective	707	0.0	New	0	Steady	Steady
Communist League	323	0.0	New	0	Steady	Steady

Total votes cast: 15,361,267

=== Northern Ireland ===
Party	Candidate(s)	Seats	Loss/Gain	First Preference Votes	
Party	Candidate(s)	Seats	Loss/Gain	Number	% of vote
DUP	Ian Paisley	1	0	160,110	29.9
SDLP	John Hume	1	0	136,335	25.5
UUP	Jim Nicholson	1	0	118,785	22.2
Sinn Féin	Danny Morrison	0	0	48,914	9.1
Alliance	John Alderdice	0	0	27,905	5.2
NI Conservatives	Myrtle Boal	0	0	25,789	4.8
Green	Malcolm Samuel	0	0	6,569	1.2
Workers' Party	Seamus Lynch	0	0	5,590	1.0
Labour Representation	Mark Langhammer	0	0	3,540	0.7
Labour '87	Brian Caul	0	0	1,274	0.2

Total votes cast – 534,811.

== Party Leaders in 1989 ==
- Labour – Neil Kinnock
- Conservative – Margaret Thatcher
- Green – N/A (the Green Party did not have a leader)
- Social and Liberal Democrats – Paddy Ashdown
- Scottish National Party – Gordon Wilson
- Plaid Cymru – Dafydd Elis Thomas
- Democratic Unionist Party – Ian Paisley
- Social Democratic and Labour Party – John Hume
- Ulster Unionist Party – James Molyneaux

== See also ==
- Elections in the United Kingdom: European elections
- List of members of the European Parliament for the United Kingdom (1989–1994)
