= Stewart-Clark baronets =

Baronetcy in the Baronetage of the United Kingdom

The Stewart-Clark Baronetcy, of Dundas in the County of West Lothian, is a title in the Baronetage of the United Kingdom. It was created on 12 February 1918 for John Stewart-Clark. He was a director of the firm of Clark & Co. Born John Clark, he assumed the additional surname of Stewart in 1909.

The family seat is Dundas Castle, South Queensferry, West Lothian.

== Stewart-Clark baronets, of Dundas (1918) ==
- Sir John Stewart-Clark, 1st Baronet (1864–1924)
- Sir Stewart Stewart-Clark, 2nd Baronet (1904–1971)
- Sir John Stewart-Clark, 3rd Baronet (1929–2026)
- Alexander Dudley Stewart-Clark, 4th Baronet (born 1960).

There is no heir to the title.

Sir John Stewart-Clark, 1st Baronet, was the son of Stewart Clark, a politician and thread entrepreneur.
