= Passion Plays in the British Isles =

Passion Plays in the British Isles have had a long and complex history involving faith and devotion, civic pageantry, antisemitism, religious and political censorship, large-scale revival and historical re-enactments. The origin and history of the Passion Play in Great Britain differs substantially from that of its equivalents in continental Europe, South and North America, Australia and other parts of the world.

== History ==
=== Origin ===
One of the earliest pieces of theatre in Britain was the Quem Quaeritis: four lines spoken by two choirs addressing each other in a dramatic form. This started the development of liturgical drama which combined education with entertainment within the church. It was intended not for evangelism, but as an aid to devotion. According to Lynette Muir:

The liturgical and patristic forms which dominated the first church plays were challenged by the great cultural and spiritual renaissance of the twelfth century with its stress on the primacy of the individual. Theologically, the Church, which had been focussed on crusades against the threat to Christianity from pagan and heretical groups, began to pay more attention to the spiritual needs of its own flock at home.

Emerging out of and developing alongside liturgical drama, was the religious drama of the Corpus Christi plays which moved outside the church. Thus developed the large-scale Mystery Plays that were performed by city guilds during the Corpus Christi or Midsummer festival each year until the middle of the sixteenth-century.

As part of these Mystery Plays, public performances of the Passion provided a mixture of education and entertainment, but more importantly, they became significant acts of civic pride and public devotion. The depth of public devotion, however, is questioned by suggestions that the behaviour of actors and spectators during play performances was often more suited to the carnival than to devout contemplation.

=== Development of Passion Plays and Mystery Cycles ===
The Mystery Plays were, at the height of their popularity, entire cycles of individual plays which involved the entire city. City guilds were responsible for different plays in the cycle. In York, for example, the Flood was performed by the Fishers and Mariners, the Slaughter of the Innocents by the Girdlers and Nailers, the Crucifixion by the Butchers, the Resurrection by the Carpenters and the Last Judgement by the Mercers. Costumes and props were also used by the guilds and often included a gilded face for God in creation plays, a donkey outfit for the Balaam plays, fake blood for the crucifixion and a flaming hell mouth with fireworks for the increasingly dramatic Last Judgement as the world was destroyed in a flames and sparks.

Other special effects were created by the pageant wagon itself, which was at its simplest a raised stage and at its most sophisticated a two-story structure with machinery to raise and lower angels and a trapdoor that opened up to hell. This hell mouth became an increasingly spectacular construct, and engravings show a gaping, monstrous mouth spurting flames and engulfing men and women who were bound for hell.

According to Beadle and King, the guilds’ involvement indicated the sanctity of everyday life: a recognition that their labour and produce came from God and should be used to honour God. Furthermore, Mystery Plays offered spectators a spiritual experience as well as entertainment. As Dee Dyas (1997) puts it, the audience were ‘vital players in this epic drama, for the mystery cycles, the miracles or saint’s plays and the moralities were all designed to warn and win souls’

The Mystery Plays were highly popular performances that brought the city’s citizens together, as well as attracting visitors from surrounding cities and towns. Royal and noble visitors to cities which performed Mystery Plays had special plays put on for them, such as those put on by the guilds of Coventry for Margaret of Anjou in 1457 (who was reportedly disappointed that she missed the Draper's Doomsday play due to lack of daylight), Richard III in 1485 (less than three months before his death), and Henry VIII in 1493 (King and Davidson, 2000). Mystery Plays thus promoted civic prestige and economy, adding to the reputation of the town as well as the honour of God in what Dyas (1997) terms a ‘neat blend of religious fervour and burgeoning civic pride.

Public performances of Passion Plays lasted from the fourteenth century to the middle of the sixteenth century, with a few examples into the seventeenth century. There is a reference to playing Christ in a medieval Passion Play is found in a Good Friday sermon:

When the game was over, all the players talked among themselves and considered playing again; and one of them said, "Who shall be Christ?" The others said, "He who played today, since he played well."

According to Helen Cooper, performances of the Mystery Cycle ‘…continued well into Elizabeth’s reign, and in places further from the centre of government – Cornwall, where the plays were in Cornish; Kendal; Kilkenny – comparable plays are recorded into the seventeenth century'.

=== Influence on Shakespeare ===
Shakespeare expects his audience to be familiar with characters and events in the Mystery Plays and alludes to the Passion Plays he most probably would have seen in nearby Coventry. The majority of Shakespeare's plays contain biblical references, and some of those are specific references to the events and characters contained in Passion Plays.

For example, in Macbeth and Hamlet, there is reference to Pontius Pilate who famously washed his hands to signify his innocence of the death of Christ. Both Lady Macbeth and Macbeth talk of washing blood from their hands. As Macbeth puts it:

Will all great Neptune’s ocean wash this blood

Clean from my hand? No, this my hand will rather The multitudinous seas incarnadine,

Making the green one red. (Act 2 Scene 2)

There are also references to the crucifixion, staged with copious amounts of stage blood in medieval Passion Plays, in Macbeth. A war-weary Captain gives an account of the bravery of Macbeth and Banquo during a battle referring to 'another Golgotha':

If I say sooth, I must report they were

As cannons overcharged with double cracks, So they doubly redoubled strokes upon the foe. Except they meant to bathe in reeking wounds, Or memorize another Golgotha, I cannot tell—

But I am faint, my gashes cry for help. (Act 2 Scene 1)

=== Censorship ===
During the Reformation, the Passion Plays and Mystery Cycles were suppressed due to their perceived Catholic influences (they were performed during the Catholic Corpus Christi feast which celebrated the mass and paraded the elevated host through the city). There was also considerable Protestant hostility to the plays’ depictions of God which led to numerous examples of Protestant revisions and revised performances. According to Lynette Muir (1995) the plays were abandoned and banned by the end of the 16th century as much 'on political as on dogmatic grounds' p. 162. There is also evidence to suggest that the Mystery Plays had become far too expensive and difficult for the struggling city guilds to continue to produce.

Rosemary Woolf (1972) argues that the suppression of the Passion Plays and Mystery Cycles was a good thing and looks to the development of the Passion Plays in France which gathered irrelevant and comic elaborations over the years:

The example of French drama and the rare instances of late rewriting in England suggest that, had the cycles continued to have been revised until the time of their suppression, it would have been to their literary detriment…In France the Passions in the course of successive revisions became overblown: more and more invented incident was added to them, more ornate elaborations and irrelevant comic diversions’.

Eventually, in 1642 all theatre was banned with the suppression of the playhouses by a Puritan Parliament. With the Restoration, theatres opened again in 1660, this time with women permitted to perform on the stage. However, religion and politics were heavily censored for the next few hundred years in England and no Passion Play was performed publicly during this time.

=== Revival ===
Passion Plays are biblical dramas that portray the Easter story. They depict the events of Jesus Christ's trial, death and resurrection and may also extend to the events of his life, works and miracles. Today they are performed at Easter and often take place in public spaces such as city centres and town squares, many of them as free, community-led performances.

Popular biblical dramas of the Middle Ages – including liturgical drama, Passion Plays and the Corpus Christi cycles or Mystery Play – are the originators of modern Passion Plays. The Mystery Plays were epic play cycles were large-scale productions financed and produced by medieval guilds for the glory of God and the honour of their city. The most well-known took place in York, Coventry and Chester.

This dramatic heritage is acknowledged by modern Passion Plays. The similarities between contemporary community-led, Bible focused plays from the Middle Ages and contemporary Mystery Plays and Passion Plays are recognised by artists involved in the plays, journalists and academics.

The revival of Passion Plays began with the revival of the York Mystery Plays in 1951 as part of the Festival of Britain, the Chester Mystery Plays in the 1970s and the York and Towneley Plays as part of the Edinburgh Festival in 1977. Some productions of the Mystery Plays, especially those in the 70s, recreated not only the cyclic nature of the plays, but also processional staging along medieval festival routes on wagons designed according to existing descriptions of their medieval counterparts.

== List of modern Passion Plays in the British Isles ==
Aberdeen

- The Aberdeen Passion is staged biennially in the North East of Scotland. First performed in 2012, this Passion Play recreates 1st-century Jerusalem in modern Aberdeen.

Abingdon

- The town of Abingdon Passion Play was a free, open-air production performed in 2013. This was the result of a community enterprise combining drama, music and dance which took place in different locations within Abingdon's historic Abbey Gardens.

Alresford

- Members of Churches Together in Alresford, Hampshire produced a Broad Street adaptation from Palm Sunday to Good Friday through song, dance, mime and drama for the second time in ten years in 2014. Costumes were chosen reflecting what Jesus might have worn had he lived in the modern age; he wore jeans and those arresting him wore combat fatigues.

Belper

- Belper Passion Play took place in 2017 and 2018 with 120 performers. The Passion Play (directed by Jannice Richthof and written by George Gunby) included music from the 'This Man' Oratorio by local composer Anne De Waal and this was supplemented by the CTIB Flash Mob on the streets.

Bewdley

- Bewdley Passion Play took place in 2013 and was a promenade through the town in Worcestershire. Its central River Severn Bridge was closed for over an hour and the cast of volunteer and professional actors drew hundreds of spectators.

Birmingham 1

- The Old Joint Stock Theatre Company based in Birmingham presented a modern retelling of the Passion Play in association with Birmingham Cathedral during Easter 2014.

Birmingham 2

- In 2019 the Birmingham Passion Play was performed by a diverse team of a hundred community actors, musicians and stewards alongside Saltmine Theatre Company. This unique contemporary re-telling of the Easter story processed from Birmingham Bullring, along New Street to Victoria Square and finished inside St Philip’s Cathedral.

Bishop Auckland

- In over Bishop Auckland over 150 volunteers from different part of the community worked with a cast of 50 to perform a Passion Play to 1,400 people on Good Friday, 2022. The performance was titled and according to Revd Canon Eileen Harrop, performance producer, the reason for this related to the theme of revelation in the Easter story:

“The name derives from the idea of Jesus’ tomb being revealed to be empty on Easter Sunday and Jesus revealing himself to Mary and the Disciples. It also refers to Revealing the true story of Easter, as for many, Easter is more about chocolate and Easter bunnies."

Brighton

- In 'Soul by the Sea'https://www.passion-plays.co.uk/soulbythesea/, volunteers from local communities in Brighton dramatised the days leading up to Jesus' arrest, death and resurrection from a script faithful to original scripture. Local community volunteers included a mixture of backgrounds, denominations and nationalities. This Passion Play is part of the broader Easter celebrations of Soul by the Sea and has drawn crowds in the thousands since 2011.

Carlisle

- In 2019 the Carlisle Passion Play was performed by a cast of 47 actors, crew of 10, plus 55 singers and musicians from CTC Musicians, a professional Soloist, the Salvation Army Band and Songsters, and the Carlisle Taize Choir rehearsed over a period of weeks in local Churches and the historical Tithe Barn. The play was a modern, contemporary interpretation performed using the whole of the City Centre historical Town Hall Square and a specially constructed stage.

Chester

- The Chester Passion took place in various locations around the city on Good Friday 2o22, from Eastgate Clock to the Cross, along Northgate Street to Town Hall Square, and ending at Chester Cathedral.

Cowbridge

- The town of Cowbridge in the Vale of Glamorgan presented a Passion Play on Good Friday 22 April 2011 at Holy Cross Church with the cast drawn from each of the denominations of churches there.

Devizes

- A Passion Play takes place every ten years in the town in West Wiltshire; events from Christ's arrest to his crucifixion are depicted in a Jerusalem style promenade performance.

Edinburgh

- Since 2005, a Passion Play has been staged in Princes Street Gardens over the Easter weekend. Crowds of up to 2,000 people come to watch the community theatre productions portraying the events of the Easter story. The 2014 production was written by the playwright Rob Drummond with obvious reference to modern-day Scotland without taking political sides; the diverging behaviours and reactions within Jerusalem society served to point to the dangers of people letting the 2014 independence referendum debate break down atheir normal relationships.
- Between 2003 and 2018, the theatre director Charles Nowosielski produced four quinquenial Passion Plays, which were performed on Easter Sundays at locations around Duddingston village.

Great North Passion

- The Great North Passion drew a crowd of thousands and was televised on BBC One in a live one-hour event on Good Friday 2014. The twelve stations of the cross were the focus of twelve dramatic, artistic and musical interpretations from different local communities in Northumberland, Middlesbrough, North and South Tyneside and Gateshead.

Havant

- The town performed its first Passion Play in 2015 as a collective effort by its church congregations and their leaders in worship. A BBC news clip shows the final preparations for the cast and crew of the Havant Passion Play.

Hornchurch

- One of the longest running and becoming one of the most renowned in the UK is the Hornchurch Passion Play, which is performed every five years or so on the Green by the Queens Theatre in Hornchurch, Essex to a crowd often numbering thousands over the Easter weekend. With a cast of over 70 actors and a full choir and band the performance began in 1995 and has run every fifth Easter ever since, only being postponed in 2020 due to COVID. The current director, Simon Pugsley, has also been involved since 1995, playing a 16 year old soldier. In 2000 he played the disciple John and in 2005 Simon Zealot before taking the lead role of Jesus in 2011 and 2015. Kevin Walsh (RADA trained professional actor), the then director and one of the founders of the play handed over the directing responsibility to Simon in 2022, when the play was re-established following the COVID postponement. With a cast of around 60 and a full band and choir, the play is an immersive experience where the audience become the "crowd of Jerusalem" as the action takes places all around them on various stages.

Isle of Man

- The Manx Passion was a promenade performance that took place in the Spring of 2014, often outdoors at scenic sites on the isle. Its Acts and Scenes selected important teachings and messages in the Bible from Creation to the Passion. It was adapted from the Mystery Plays of York, Chester and the Wakefield Cycles by Christopher Denys.

Lanarkshire

- “Resurrection!” was performed in Hamilton town centre at 2:00 pm on Saturday, 31 March and an excerpt was performed in Strathclyde Country Park on Saturday, 14 April at 2:00 pm by Drama Kirk. The play was adapted from an Edinburgh Easter Play script by Kamala Jane Santos. Other Passion Plays have been performed between 2017 and 2020. In 2022, their Passion Play, titled 'I am with you always' was written by Scottish Playwright, Simon McCallum, and performed in Hamilton town centre.

Leominster

- The town of Leominster in Herefordshire holds a Passion Play on Good Friday every four years, performed by volunteers from churches of all denominations in the town. The play is performed outdoors with each scene in a different position in the streets and squares of the town centre. The 2008 performance included bespoke music by local composer Liam Dunachie.

Liverpool

- Liverpool Cathedral presents a Passion Play each year to dramatise the events of Holy Week. The 2014 production was written by Mark Lovelady and Dan Bishop hand included an extra act showing Jesus' resurrection.

Manchester (2006)

- BBC Three broadcast a modern eclectic musical-genre Passion Play, the Manchester Passion in 2006. The last hours of Jesus Christ's life told through legendary music from some of Manchester's greatest musicians, including New Order, Oasis and The Smiths. It was narrated by Keith Allen, and starred Darren Morfitt as Jesus. Denise Johnson played Mary, Tim Booth played Judas, and Nicholas Bailey played Peter.

Manchester (2017)

- The people of Greater Manchester came together to stage a performance of Christ's crucifixion and resurrection. It was filmed by BBC Songs of Praise and was the subject of a documentary available online.

Newark-on-Trent

- The town of Newark-on-Trent hosted the Newark Passion written by James Pacey performed in 2011 in the Church of St. Mary Magdalene and in 2012 performed in nearby Southwell Minster.

Norwich

- A Passion Play took place in various sites around the city, including Hay Hill, Millennium Plain, the Forum and St Peter Mancroft. Mary Magdalene drew the crowds from atop a plinth, the Palm Sunday procession was led by Jesus (on a bike) to Millennium Plain, the Last Supper featured fish and chips from Norwich Market and the Resurrection took place in St Peter Mancroft with a live Gospel choir.

Oxford

- The Cowley Road Passion Play first took place in Oxford in 2012. Its 2014 production attracted national attention because it was cancelled at the last moment. City Council Licensing officials refused to let it proceed without a fully debated decision, having presumed the motive for notifying that authority regarding the 'Passion Play'as a sex-related production necessitating full permission under the 2003 Act. Despite the producers enquiring if the council would share the widespread view it fell within the meaning of "The provision of any entertainment or entertainment facilities for the purposes of, or for purposes incidental to, a religious meeting or service" following licensing deregulation by the Licensing Act 2003.

Poole

- The town of Poole stages the play viewed Through the Eyes of a Child every two years known as Poole Community Passion Play (PCPP). It has been performed since written in 2009. It is performed by a diverse inter-generational group of amateur and professional actors, actresses, singers and choreographed performers.

Port Talbot

- The town of Port Talbot at BBC Wales studios hosted a Passion Play directed by award-winning actor Michael Sheen on 22–24 April 2011.

Shrewsbury

- The market town of Shrewsbury, in the heart of Shropshire staged its first Passion Play on Good Friday 2019 called The Shrewsbury Passion. What began many years ago as a silent 'walk of witness' through the town every Good Friday reached a culmination in 2019 when it was decided by the head of the Shrewsbury Street Pastors Steve Jones to create a short script which would dramatize the crucifixion of Christ. This was enthusiastically met by the town council. The Shrewsbury Passion brought together a cast of 14 locals and operated on a budget of only £1000. Many Christian denominations were involved in the production; Anglican, Catholic, Protestant, Evangelical and most notably the role of Jesus Christ played by an Orthodox Christian (actor Ryan Clement Kouroukis). The Shrewsbury Passion included the traditional 'walk of witness' (starting from St. Mary's church and ending in front of the Old Market Hall). The new inaugural production in 2019 was seen by approximately 600 people and lasted just over an hour. A new theatre company was formed soon afterwards to further promote and tell the Gospel stories through theatre. The Shrewsbury Mystery Plays is now a registered charity, and plans to perform the Passion play, a Christmas play and others on a regular year-to-year basis. The 2020 Shrewsbury Passion was to involve an expanded script, larger cast and larger budget but was cancelled due to the Covid-19 government shutdown.

Southampton

- The city of Southampton hosted a modern largely musical-genre version, The Southampton Passion, on Good Friday, 22 April 2011. Another performance, One Man’s Passion, was performed in 2019 with 7 different characters, each with their own voice/accent, as well as the main ‘storyteller’. This was recorded for a radio program and broadcast on Unity Radio on Easter morning.

South Woodham Ferrers

- The town in Essex performed its first Passion Play 2009 'to speak to all people of all times'; the characters variously wore contemporary clothes or traditional costumes and the actor playing Jesus arrived in the play on a Harley Davidson motorcycle. Its script is based on original accounts in the Bible, using modern language and realistic performances.

Tonbridge

- Tonbridge Passion Play takes place in the grounds of Tonbridge Castle and Rochester Prison over the Easter Weekend since 2013.

Trafalgar Square

- Trafalgar Square hosts The Passion of Christ play twice on Good Friday afternoon, drawing up to 20,000 spectators and having a large cast with colourful costumes, horses and a donkey. The Wintershall Players' performance from Surrey is supported by the Mayor of London and complements the one-week running The Nativity and The Life of Christ plays in June and December in Wintershall, Bramley, Surrey supported by the Diocese of Guildford, the Roman Catholic Diocese covering Surrey and Sussex (Arundel & Brighton) and ticket sales of the latter two plays.

Wirral

- Christ's Passion for Wirral (2017) was a live, contemporary retelling of the Greatest Story Ever Told and a weekend of activity across the whole of the Wirral. It was a chance for people across Wirral, Merseyside, Cheshire and beyond to engage with the real-life events of the first Easter. The four-day Easter event on the Wirral was made into a radio documentary by Flame Christian Radio with interviews and sounds from the live events. The line-up of events on Easter Sunday took place at Birkenhead Park took place in front of the Jackson Memorial opposite the grand entrance and past the visitors' centre.

Woodstock

- Woodstock Passion Play in 2014 saw a promenade performance in the town square and the Oxfordshire Museum Gardens; a local community production with a cast of over 70 people and hundreds of spectators in the crowd.

Worcester

- Worcester Passion Play took place on the streets of Worcester from the high street to Cathedral Square, with Roman soldiers in period costume, two soldiers arriving on horseback and a donkey accompanying Jesus.

== Supporters of Passion Plays in the United Kingdom ==
=== Passion Trust ===
The Passion Trust supports the resurgence of Passion Plays in the United Kingdom through resourcing, networking, advocating and financing new and existing plays. Established in 2011, its vision is to energise the growing number of Passion Plays taking place in the UK.
