= Jack Stewart-Clark =

British businessman and politician (1929–2026)

Sir Jack Stewart-Clark Bt
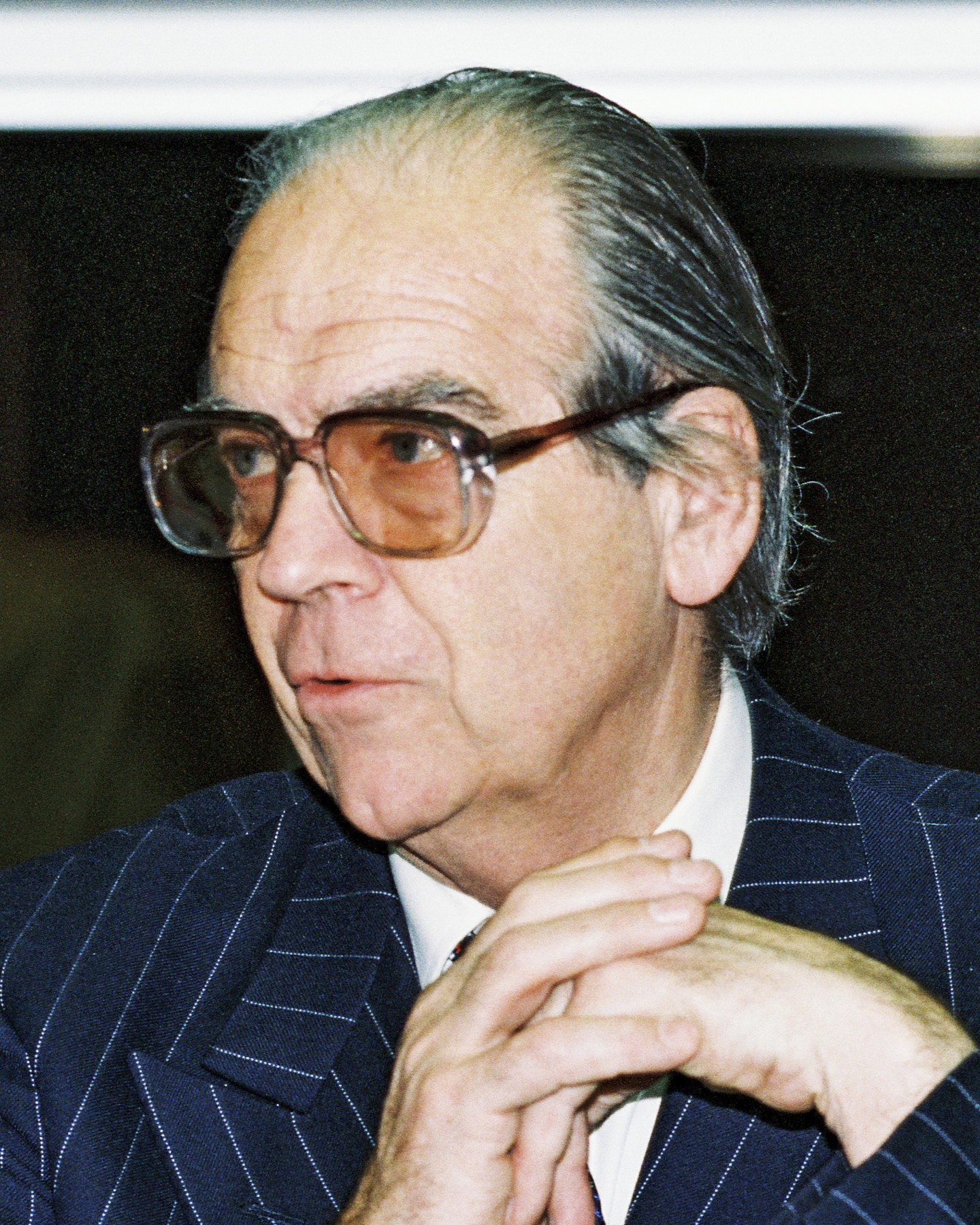
- Stewart-Clark in 1998

Member of the European Parliament for East Sussex and Kent South
- In office 19 July 1994 – 19 July 1999

Member of the European Parliament for Sussex East
- In office 17 July 1979 – 18 July 1994

Personal details
- Born: 17 September 1929 Dalmeny, Scotland
- Died: 22 June 2026 (aged 96)
- Party: Conservative and Unionist
- Spouse: Lydia Loudon
- Education: Balliol College, Oxford; Harvard Business School

Military service
- Allegiance: United Kingdom
- Branch/service: British Army
- Rank: Lieutenant
- Unit: Coldstream Guards

Sir John Stewart-Clark, 3rd Baronet (17 September 1929 – 22 June 2026) was a British businessman and Conservative and Unionist Party politician who served as a Member of the European Parliament from 1979 to 1999, including as its Vice-President from 1992 to 1997.

== Early life and education ==
Born in Dalmeny, Scotland, Stewart-Clark was the son of Sir Stewart Stewart-Clark, 2nd Baronet, and Jane Pamela Clarke. He was educated at Eton College and Balliol College, Oxford, where he was encouraged by his future employer, J. & P. Coats Ltd., to study history, and later at Harvard Business School,

== Career ==
=== Army ===
In 1948 Stewart-Clark was commissioned into the Coldstream Guards, serving in North Africa during his national service. In 1958 he was appointed to the Royal Company of Archers, the monarch's bodyguard in Scotland.

=== Business ===
From 1953 to 1969 Stewart-Clark worked with the family firm J. & P. Coats Ltd. in Europe, Asia and South America. In 1969 he joined Philips and served as managing director of Philips Electrical Ltd. from 1970 to 1975. Afterwards, from 1975 to 1979, he was managing director of Pye Ltd., where Peter Thorneycroft, the Chairman of the Conservative Party, was the external chairman. After 1979 he held non-executive director roles with several firms, including A.T. Kearney and TSB Scotland.

=== Politics ===
Stewart-Clark stood as a Unionist candidate for Aberdeen North in the 1959 election, coming second behind Hector Hughes. Having decided to go into politics, his speeches caught the attention of Prime Minister Harold Macmillan, who said: "We'll be seeing more of that young man".

In 1979 Stewart-Clark was encouraged by Peter Thorneycroft to be a candidate in Britain's first direct elections to the European Parliament. He was elected as a Member of the European Parliament (MEP) for Sussex East, holding the seat until it was abolished in 1994, then continuing to sit as an MEP for the East Sussex and Kent South constituency until 1999. In the European Parliament he represented the Conservative and Unionist Party, which was aligned with the European Democrat Group until 1992, after which he sat with the Group of the European People's Party. Although sitting for an English constituency, he also acted as a representative of the Scottish Conservatives, who had no MEPs.

He was a Vice-President of the European Parliament from 1992 to 1997. He took part in several parliamentary delegations and chaired a number of initiatives, with a particular interest in the Bosnian War and the prevention of drug abuse.

== Other activities ==
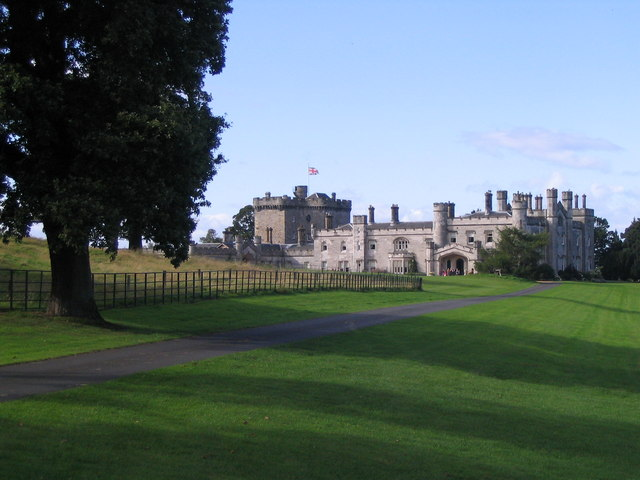
Dundas Castle in 2007

Stewart-Clark inherited Dundas Castle in South Queensferry from his mother and began a programme of restoration. The castle, built in 1818 adjacent to a 15th-century tower house, had been bought by his great-grandfather, the Paisley thread manufacturer Stewart Clark, in 1899, but had been unoccupied for three centuries and had been used by the Royal Air Force during the Second World War. Following the restoration, Stewart-Clark lived in one wing, while the rest of the house was rented out for weddings and other events.

Stewart-Clark was involved with the charity Passion Trust. In 2016 he gained approval from the Vatican to take a Passion Play to a prison in Milan. Stewart-Clark has said: "[Prisoners] can become redeemed in prison, even if you’re never getting out". Archbishop Leo Cushley was reported to be supportive of the project.

He was also a trustee of the substance abuse group Mentor Foundation, honorary president of the Queensferry lifeboat station and an ambassador for the Edinburgh Festival since 1947.

== Views ==
Although Stewart-Clark's pro-European views were mainstream among Conservatives when he was first elected, he was the most pro-European Conservative MEP at the time of his retirement. He said in 2016 that he was in favour of continued UK membership of the European Union. Sir Jack said "We absolutely have to stay...It would be dreadful if we didn’t. It’s a plunge into the unknown." Following the 2016 referendum, he and the Scottish Labour politician Tam Dalyell proposed that the UK Parliament should block the result.

== Personal life and death ==
During a business posting to the Netherlands, Stewart-Clark met Lydia Frederika Loudon (d. 2025), whom he married in 1958. They had four daughters and one son. Lydia was the niece of the Dutch businessman John Hugo Loudon, great-niece of the Dutch politician John Loudon and great-granddaughter of the Dutch colonial governor James Loudon.

He succeeded to the baronetcy in 1971 upon the death of his father. His was a distant relative of the Conservative politician Alan Clark.

Stewart-Clark died on 22 June 2026, at the age of 96. He was succeeded by his son Sir Alexander Dudley Stewart-Clark, 4th Baronet.

Baronetage of the United Kingdom
Preceded by Stewart Stewart-Clark	Baronet (of Dundas, West Lothian); 1971–2026	Succeeded by Alexander Stewart-Clark
