= Robert Stodart Wyld =

Scottish lawyer, distiller and author

Robert Stodart Wyld WS FRSE
- Born: Robert Stodart Wyld of Gilston; 16 April 1808; Leith, Scotland
- Died: 29 October 1893 (aged 85); Edinburgh, Scotland
- Burial place: Grange Cemetery, south Edinburgh
- Education: Leith Academy, no formal university training
- Occupations: lawyer, distiller and philosophical author
- Known for: operated and owned Glenforth Distillery
- Spouse(s): Isabella Georgina Maxwell (m. 1838; died 1841), Margaret Cassels (m. 1844)
- Children: 1+7
- Parents: James Wyld of Gilston (father); Marion Stodart (mother)
- Awards: Fellow, Royal Society of Edinburgh

Robert Stodart Wyld of Gilston WS FRSE (1808–1893) was a 19th-century Scottish lawyer, distiller and philosophical author.

== Life ==
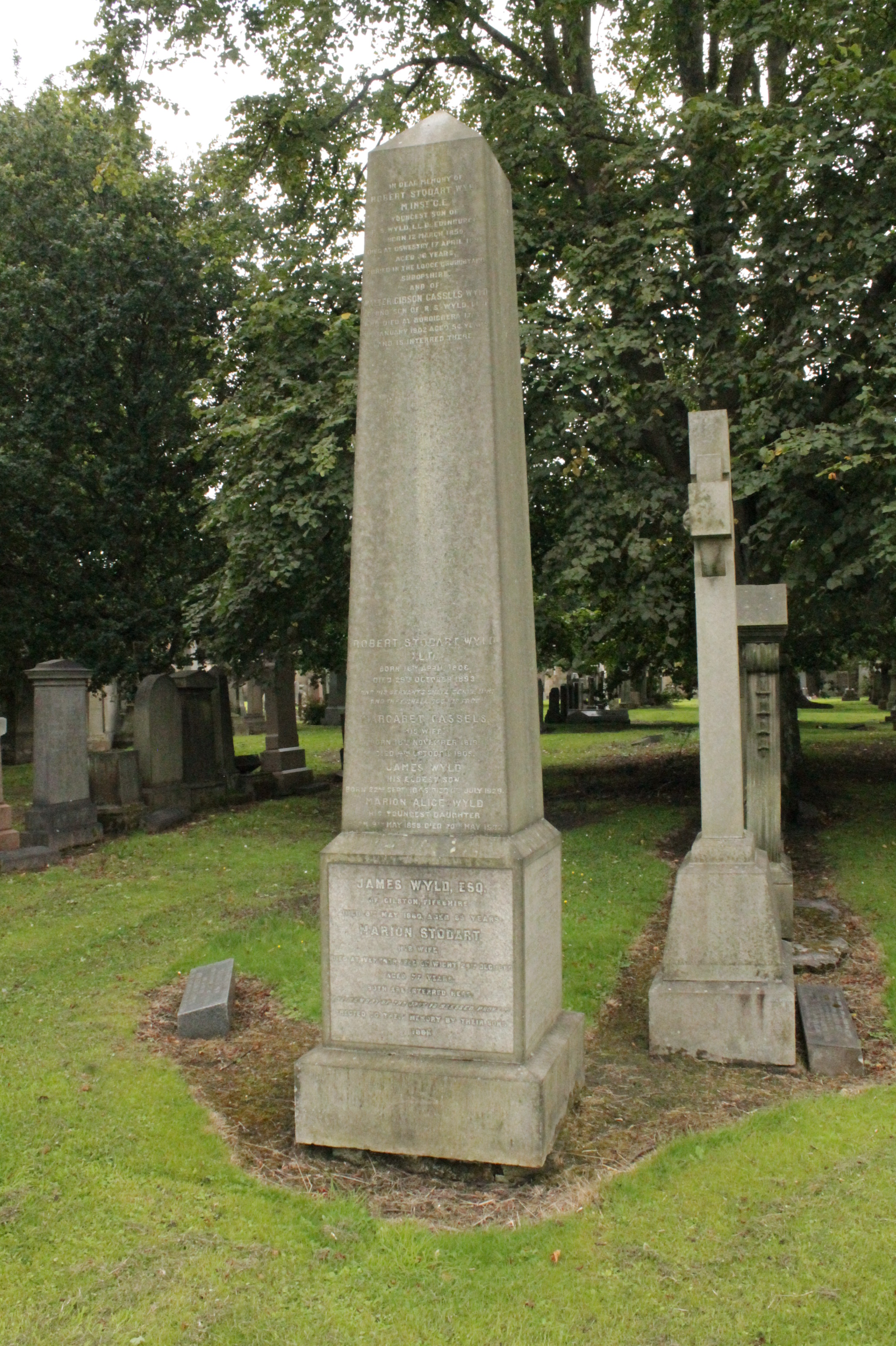
The grave of Robert Stodart Wyld, Grange Cemetery, Edinburgh

He was born on 16 April 1808, the son of Leith wine merchant James Wyld of Gilston (1776–1860) and his wife, Marion Stodart (1783–1860). The family lived at Tolbooth Wynd in Leith.

In 1810, the family moved to Bonnington Bank House, west of Leith. Robert was educated at Leith Academy. He appears to have been apprenticed as a lawyer around 1822 but did not have formal university training.

He trained as a lawyer and became a Writer to the Signet in 1833. In the 1840s he was married and living at 32 Royal Terrace on Calton Hill. Following his first wife's death he moved to South Queensferry and set up the Glenforth Distillery with his father, which he operated and owned until 1863. Glenforth Distillery stood close to the harbour on the very edge of the Firth of Forth. He also owned the brewery which gave its name to Brewery Close in the town. By 1855, he had wholly given up his legal practice and was living in South Queensferry serving as its Provost from 1852 to 1861.

On the death of his father in 1860, he inherited the magnificent Gilston House in Fife. In 1862, he sold the Gilston estate to Edward Baxter of Dundee. However, he retained the title "of Gilston" possibly due to renaming his South Queensferry House as Gilston.

In 1864 he was elected a Fellow of the Royal Society of Edinburgh. His proposer was James Lorimer.

He lived most of his life at 19 Inverleith Row in the northern Edinburgh suburbs. He died there on 29 October 1893. He is buried in Grange Cemetery in south Edinburgh. The grave lies in the north-west area of the main north-west section.

== Publications ==
- Strictures on Scottish Theology and Preaching (8 vols) (1863 under the name of "a Modern Calvinist")
- Christianity and Reason
- The Philosophy of the Senses
- Memoir of James Wyld of Gilston (1889)

== Family ==
He married twice, first in 1838 to Isabella Georgina Maxwell and, following her death in 1841, secondly in 1844 to Margaret Cassels (1819–1905), daughter of Walter Gibson Cassels.

His only child by his first marriage, Frances Maxwell Wyld (b. 1839) was sent to live at Gilston with her grandparents upon the death of her mother.

He had seven children by his second wife, including Robert Stodart Wyld (1855–1891) was an engineer and predeceased him. The eldest son Walter Gibson Cassels Wyld (1847–1902) died in Italy.
