= Sussex East (European Parliament constituency) =

Former European Parliament constituency

- European Parliament constituency
- Boundary within South East England (1979-1984)
- Member state: United Kingdom
- Created: 1979
- Dissolved: 1994
- MEPs: 1

Prior to its uniform adoption of proportional representation in 1999, the United Kingdom used first-past-the-post for the European elections in England, Scotland and Wales. The European Parliament constituencies used under that system were smaller than the later regional constituencies and only had one Member of the European Parliament each.

The constituency of Sussex East (renamed as East Sussex in 1984) was one of them.

When it was created in England in 1979, it consisted of the Westminster Parliament constituencies of Brighton Kemptown, Brighton Pavilion, Eastbourne, East Grinstead, Hastings, Hove, Lewes, and Rye. In 1984 it consisted of Bexhill and Battle, Brighton Kemptown, Brighton Pavilion, Eastbourne, Hastings and Rye, Hove, Lewes, and Wealden.

Sir Jack Stewart-Clark of the Conservatives was the MEP for the constituency's entire existence; he then went on to represent the new constituency of East Sussex and Kent South until 1999.

Boundary within South East England and London (1984-1994)

== MEPs ==
Elected	Member	Party
1979	Jack Stewart-Clark	Conservative
1994	Constituency abolished	

== Election results ==
European Parliament election, 1979: Sussex East
Party	Candidate	Votes	%	±%
Conservative	Jack Stewart-Clark	123,506	65.7	
Labour	A. S. J. Stevens	33,581	17.9	
Liberal	R. G. Moore	30,847	16.4	
Majority		89,925	47.8	
Turnout		187,934	35.1	
Conservative win (new seat)				

European Parliament election, 1984: Sussex East
Party	Candidate	Votes	%	±%
Conservative	Jack Stewart-Clark	102,287	57.9	−7.8
SDP	John E. Busby	36,666	20.8	+4.4
Labour	Harold Spillman	32,213	18.2	+0.3
Ecology	Miss Elizabeth L. Evelyn	5,401	3.1	New
Majority		65,621	37.1	
Turnout		176,567	32.9	
Conservative hold		Swing		

European Parliament election, 1989: Sussex East
Party	Candidate	Votes	%	±%
Conservative	Jack Stewart-Clark	96,388	48.2	−9.7
Labour	Mrs. Gillian M. Roles	43,094	21.6	+3.4
Green	Miss Ruth Addison	42,316	21.2	+18.1'"`UNIQ−−ref−00000019−QINU`"'
SLD	Mrs. Delia Venables	16,810	8.4	−12.4
Monster Raving Loony	D. Howell	1,181	0.6	New
Majority		53,294	26.6	−10.5
Turnout		199,789	36.1	+3.2
Conservative hold		Swing		
