= South Queensferry Tolbooth =

Municipal building in South Queensferry, Scotland

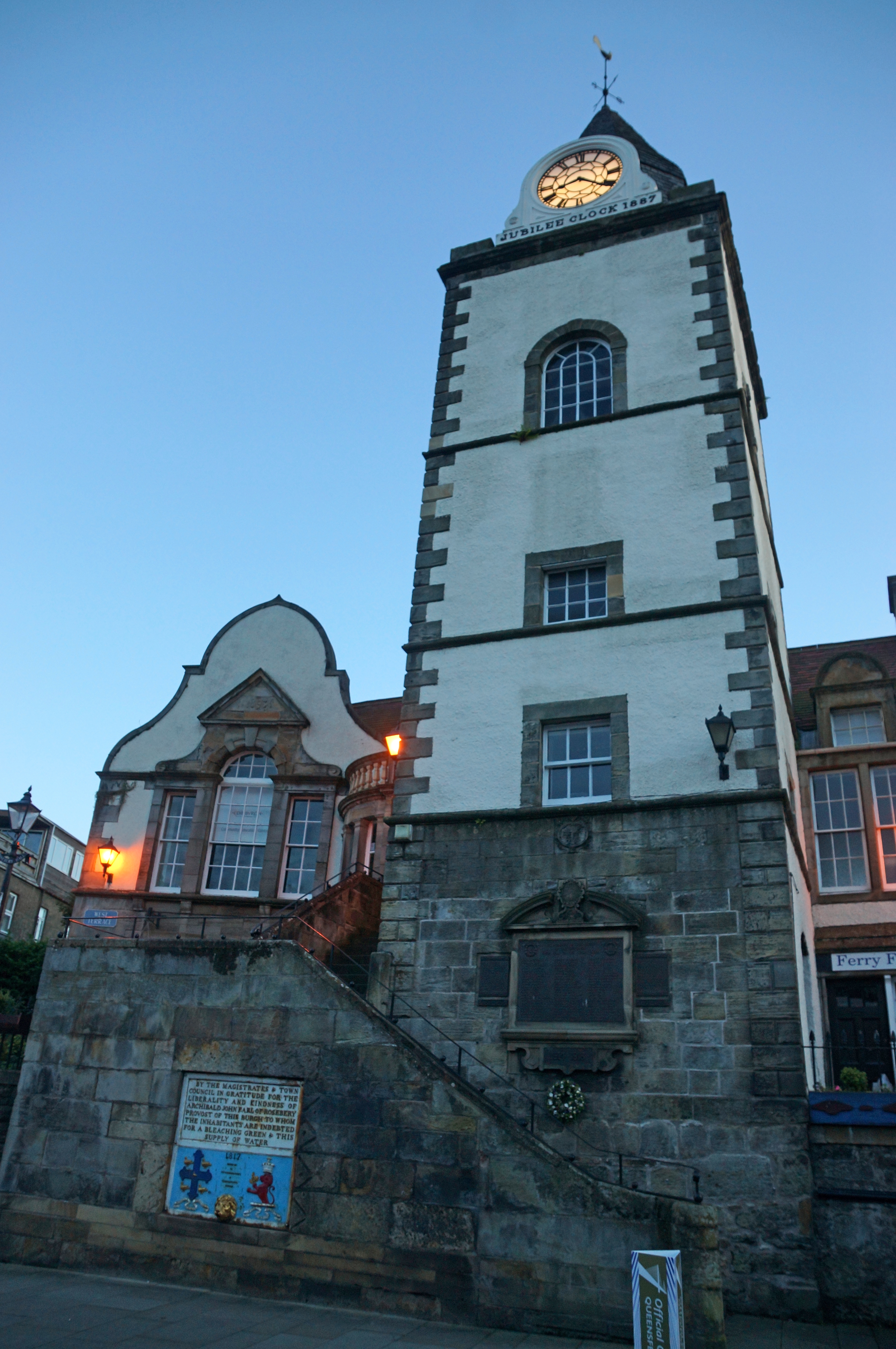
- The original tollbooth (on the right and behind) and the late 20th century memorial hall (on the left)

- Shown in Edinburgh
- 55.9902°N 3.3969°W
- Location: High Street, South Queensferry

History
- Built: 1720

Site notes
- Architectural style: Scottish Renaissance style

Listed Building – Category A
- Official name: Tolbooth, West Terrace, High Street, South Queensferry
- Designated: 22 February 1971
- Reference no.: LB40411

Listed Building – Category B
- Official name: Rosebery Memorial Hall, 17 West Terrace, High Street, South Queensferry
- Designated: 19 December 1979
- Reference no.: LB40410

The South Queensferry Tollbooth is a municipal structure in the High Street, South Queensferry, Edinburgh, Scotland. The structure, which served as the meeting place of the Royal Burgh of Queensferry, is a Category A listed building.

== History ==
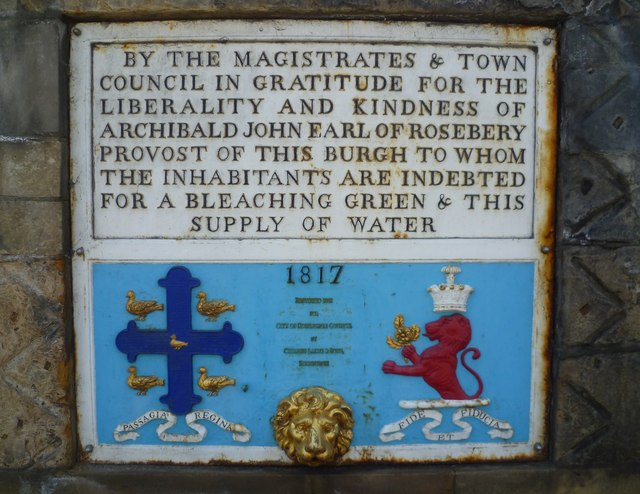
The plaque and fountain on the stairway up to the steeple

The main block of the tolbooth was built in around 1630. It was in this building that, in December 1643, seven women were incarcerated and tried for witchcraft for which the penalty was execution by strangulation and burning. The west end of the ground floor was used as a weigh house while the east end was used as a prison and the first floor accommodated an assembly room.

The structure was re-modelled with a four-stage steeple erected in front of the main block at the expense of the local member of parliament, Henry Cunningham, in 1720. The steeple was faced with sandstone on the ground floor and with a harled finish on the first, second and third floors and fenestrated with square windows on the first and second floors and a round headed window on the third floor. A courtroom was established on the first floor of the steeple at an early stage.

In 1807, an octagonal belfry was added to the steeple and, in 1817, a plaque and a fountain were unveiled on the stairway up to the steeple to commemorate the contribution by Archibald Primrose, 4th Earl of Rosebery who had provided a bleachfield and a water supply for the town. In 1888, clock faces were added to commemorate the Golden Jubilee of Queen Victoria, an innovation which the historian, Thomas Scott Muir, regarded as having "disfigured" the steeple.

The complex was further expanded by the addition of the Rosebery Memorial Hall which was commissioned by Archibald Primrose, 5th Earl of Rosebery in memory of his wife, Hannah, and erected at a slight angle to the east of the main block. It was designed by Sydney Mitchell and Wilson in the Scottish Renaissance style, faced with similar finishes to the steeple and was completed in 1893. The hall featured a Venetian window on the first floor with a pediment containing a date stone in the tympanum, all surmounted by an ogee-shaped gable. Internally, the principal room in the memorial hall was the auditorium.

A plaque to commemorate the lives of local service personnel who had died in the First World War was unveiled at the base of the steeple in November 1927. The building remained the meeting place of the Royal Burgh of Queensbury for much of the first half of the 20th century but ceased to be the local seat of government after a new council chamber was installed at the former Viewforth Hotel further to the southeast along the High Street in 1945. The complex subsequently served as an events venue with organisations such as the Central Scotland Ballet School renting the auditorium.

== See also ==
- List of listed buildings in Edinburgh/17
- List of Category A listed buildings in Edinburgh
