= Clan Dundas =

Scottish clan

- Dun deas

Profile
- Region: Lowlands
- District: West Lothian

Chief
- David Duncan Dundas of Dundas – lived in South Africa, and moved to Canada in 2006
- Dundas of Dundas
- Historic seat: Dundas Castle
Septs of Clan Dundas
Dundas, Elias, Ellet, Ellias
Clan branches
Dundas of Dundas (chiefs)
Dundas of Arniston (senior cadets)
Dundas of Zetland
Dundas of Blair Castle
Dundas of Duddingston
Dundas of Fingask

Clan Dundas /ˌdʌnˈdæs/ is a Scottish clan, whose Chief, David Dundas of Dundas, is recognized by Lord Lyon King of Arms and is a member of the Standing Council of Scottish Chiefs

== History ==
=== Origins of the clan ===
The ancestry of the chiefs of Clan Dundas is said to be traced from Helias, son of Utred, son of Gospatrick, Prince of Northumberland. However it is during the reign of William the Lion that the first reliable record of the family is found, when Serle de Dundas appears on a deed from this period. Later in 1296 Serle de Dundas and Robert de Dundas both appear on the Ragman Rolls swearing fealty to Edward I of England.

=== 15th and 16th centuries ===
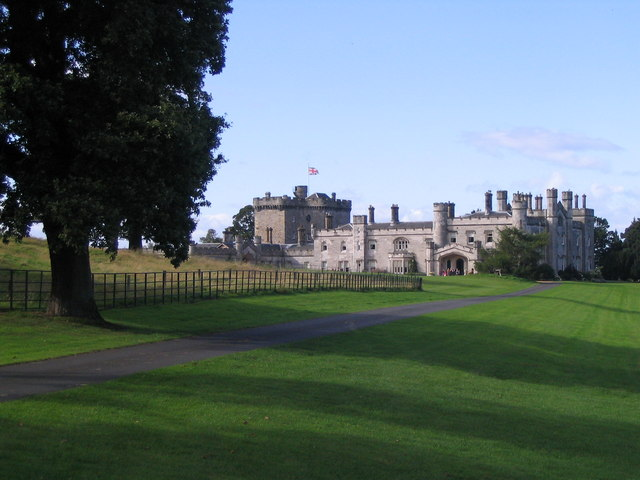
Dundas Castle was the historic seat of the chiefs of Clan Dundas

Sir Archibald Dundas was a favourite of James III of Scotland and was sent by him on several important missions into England. The king intended to give high rank to Dundas but died before he could do so. The next king, James IV of Scotland did, bestowing lands upon Dundas which included the island of Inchgarvie – with the right to build a castle there.

The principal branches of the Clan Dundas were Dundas of Blair Castle, Dundas of Arniston, Dundas of Duddingston and Dundas of Fingask.

=== 17th century and civil war ===
The eighteenth laird was George Dundas who was a staunch Presbyterian and fought in the Wars of the Covenant. He was a member of the committee for the trial of James Graham, 1st Marquis of Montrose. Dundas was given command of Linlithgowshire and was charged with its defense against Oliver Cromwell.

The Dundases of Arniston were the senior cadets of the clan and they acquired distinction through high legal and political office. Sir James Dundas, 1st of Arniston was Governor of Berwick under James VI of Scotland. His son was Sir James Dundas, Lord Arniston who in 1641 was knighted by King Charles I. He also sat as a member of the Scottish parliament representing Mid-Lothian. Dundas was a loyal subject to the King but vehemently disapproved of the King's interference with the Church of Scotland. He was particularly opposed to the re-introduction of bishops. He was one of the first to sign the National Covenant. Upon the Restoration of 1660 Dundas accepted an offer to have a seat on the bench of the supreme court despite not being a professional lawyer. He took the post as Lord Arniston in 1662. However he did not last long because he did not sign the declaration of 1663 stating that both the National Covenant and the Solemn League Covenant were unlawful.

=== 18th century and Jacobite risings ===
William Dundas of Kincavel was the ancestor of the Dundas of Blair Castle branch of the clan. He was a Jacobite who was imprisoned for his part in the Jacobite rising of 1715.

Sir David Dundas was born in Edinburgh in 1735 and went on to become commander-in-chief of the British Army in 1809.

=== Modern history ===
The twenty-eighth chief of Clan Dundas was Admiral Sir Charles Hope Dundas who was an Aide-de-camp to King George V and the principal naval transport officer during World War I.

His son, Adam Duncan Dundas of Dundas (1903–1951), succeeded as 29th Chief in 1924. He was commissioned into 71st (Forth) Heavy Anti-Aircraft Regiment, Royal Artillery of the Territorial Army in 1938 and served as a battery commander during World War II, OC of the 228th H.A.A. Battery, 175th H.A.A. Regiment in Gibraltar, ending the war with the rank of major.

== Tartan ==
Tartan image	Notes
	Dundas tartan, as published in 1842 in Vestiarium Scoticum.

== Peerage and baronetage ==
- Marquess of Zetland (1892)
- Earl of Zetland (1838)
- Earl of Ronaldshay (1892)
- Viscount Melville (1802)
- Baron Dundas (1794)
- Baron Dunira (1802)
- Baronet Dundas (1762)
- Lord Arniston (1662)
