= East Sussex and Kent South (European Parliament constituency) =

Former European Parliament constituency

- European Parliament constituency
- Boundary within South East England and London (1994-1999)
- Member state: United Kingdom
- Created: 1994
- Dissolved: 1999
- MEPs: 1

Prior to its uniform adoption of proportional representation in 1999, the United Kingdom used first-past-the-post for the European elections in England, Scotland and Wales. The European Parliament constituencies used under that system were smaller than the later regional constituencies and only had one Member of the European Parliament each.

The constituency of East Sussex and Kent South was one of them.

It consisted of the Westminster Parliament constituencies (on their 1983 boundaries) of Bexhill and Battle, Eastbourne, Hastings and Rye, Lewes, Sevenoaks, Tunbridge Wells, and Wealden.

Sir Jack Stewart-Clark of the Conservatives was the MEP for the constituency's entire existence; he had previously represented the old constituency of Sussex East since 1979.

== MEPs ==
| Election | Member | Party |
|---|---|---|
| 1994 | Sir Jack Stewart-Clark, Bt | Conservative |
| 1999 | Constituency abolished: see South East England | |

== Election results ==
European Parliament election, 1994: East Sussex and Kent South
| Party | Candidate | Votes | % | ±% |
|---|---|---|---|---|
| Conservative | Sir Jack Stewart-Clark, Bt | 83,141 | 38.6 | |
| Liberal Democrats | David Bellotti | 76,929 | 35.7 | |
| Labour | Nick Palmer | 35,273 | 16.4 | |
| UKIP | Arthur J. Burgess | 9,058 | 4.2 | |
| Green | Miss Ruth Addison | 7,439 | 3.5 | |
| Liberal | Mrs. M-T. (Theresia) Williamson | 2,558 | 1.2 | |
| Natural Law | N.P. (Paul) Cragg | 765 | 0.4 | |
| Majority | | 6,212 | 2.9 | |
| Turnout | | 215,163 | | |
| Conservative win (new seat) | | | | |
