= Jubilee1 =

Coordinates: 55.9881°N 3.3970°W

- Type: radio, television and online
- Country: Scotland
- Availability: National; Worldwide
- Motto: "The one from Queensferry"
- Owner: Caledonia Media
- Key people: Charles Fletcher, Director
- Launch date: 3 August 2002
- Former names: Jubilee FM / Jubilee TV (2002–2006)
- Official website: jubilee1.com via Wayback Machine

Jubilee1 was a Scottish radio station.

== History ==
The station was launched in 2002 as Jubilee FM, a local radio station operating under a restricted service licence for one week to celebrate Ferry Fair week. It then continued to operate in this fashion until 2006 when it rebranded as Jubilee1, part of the Jubilee MultiChannel package.

Jubilee1 broadcast from Queensferry for Edinburgh, Fife and West Lothian in Scotland. It offered listeners live streaming programmes plus the option to play again at a time of personal choice using the unique Jubilee1 OchAyePlayer. Jubilee1 had a wide a range of information and entertainment in radio, television, online and games. The station also carried live coverage of First Minister's Questions from the Scottish Parliament, every Thursday at midday.

The station came to a halt at 10 o'clock on 26 December 2009 amidst a funding crisis. The last radio show was available online to listen to for part of 2010, but is currently unavailable.
