= List of listed buildings in Edinburgh/17 =

This is a list of listed buildings in Edinburgh, Scotland.

== List ==
Name	Location	Date listed	Grid ref. (Note: Sometimes known as OSGB36, the grid reference (where provided) is based on the British national grid reference system used by the Ordnance Survey. • "Guide to National Grid". Ordnance Survey. • "Get-a-map". Ordnance Survey.)	Geo-coordinates	Notes	LB number (Note: Historic Environment Scotland assign a unique alphanumeric identifier to each designated site in Scotland, for listed buildings this always begins with "LB", for example "LB12345".)	Image
17-21 (Odd Nos) Gilmore Place, Including Boundary Walls				55°56′30″N 3°12′16″W	Category B	44952	Upload Photo
26 Clermiston Road Including Boundary Walls, Postbox And Outhouse				55°56′40″N 3°16′49″W	Category C(S)	44748	Upload Photo
26 St John's Road Including Boundary Walls And Gatepiers				55°56′34″N 3°16′41″W	Category C(S)	44756	Upload Photo
Corstorphine Road, 1-5 (Inclusive Nos) Downie Terrace Including Boundary Walls				55°56′31″N 3°16′02″W	Category C(S)	44761	Upload Photo
Lochend Road South, Lochend Park, Old Water House				55°57′43″N 3°09′37″W	Category B	44627	Upload Photo
1 South Bridge, Bank Hotel				55°57′00″N 3°11′14″W	Category B	44598	Upload another image
21 West Mayfield, Including Boundary Walls				55°56′00″N 3°10′32″W	Category C(S)	44441	Upload Photo
1 Burgess Terrace, Including Boundary Walls And Pedestrian Gateway				55°56′02″N 3°10′04″W	Category C(S)	44204	Upload Photo
18 - 22 (Even Nos) Duncan Street, Including Duncan Street Garage				55°56′05″N 3°10′42″W	Category B	44213	Upload another image
7 And 9 Granby Road, Including Boundary Walls				55°55′41″N 3°10′20″W	Category C(S)	44221	Upload Photo
169 Mayfield Road And 43 Esslemont Road, Including Boundary Walls				55°55′28″N 3°10′17″W	Category B	44226	Upload Photo
Mayfield Road And West Mains Road, University Of Edinburgh, King's Buildings, Civil And Environmental Engineering (Formerly Animal Genetics)				55°55′23″N 3°10′41″W	Category B	44227	Upload Photo
32 And 33 Queens Crescent, Including Boundary Walls				55°56′02″N 3°10′14″W	Category C(S)	44255	Upload Photo
20 Cammo Crescent, Including Gatepiers And Boundary Wall				55°57′38″N 3°18′33″W	Category C(S)	43933	Upload Photo
140 Balgreen Road, Jenners Depository, With Lodge, Garages, Gatepiers, Gates And Railings				55°56′19″N 3°15′08″W	Category B	43847	Upload another image
Brunswick Road, Leith Walk Primary School, Including No 8 Brunswick Road (Lodge), Boundary Walls And Railings				55°57′37″N 3°10′45″W	Category B	43685	Upload Photo
1 Craighall Avenue, Trinity Academy				55°58′34″N 3°11′45″W	Category B	43687	Upload Photo
98 And 100 Ferry Road				55°58′29″N 3°11′03″W	Category C(S)	43692	Upload Photo
Newhaven, New Lighthouse				55°58′56″N 3°11′48″W	Category B	43712	Upload Photo
5 Peacock Court				55°58′50″N 3°11′35″W	Category C(S)	43722	Upload Photo
4 And 5 Wester Close				55°58′50″N 3°11′43″W	Category C(S)	43728	Upload Photo
2 And 3 Westmost Close				55°58′49″N 3°11′45″W	Category C(S)	43731	Upload Photo
6 Wester Coates Road, Redmount, Including Boundary Walls				55°56′50″N 3°13′45″W	Category B	43573	Upload Photo
1, 3, 5 And 7 Dean Path, The Old School With Former Lodge, Boundary Walls And Railings				55°57′09″N 3°13′03″W	Category B	43495	Upload another image
63- 65 (Odd Nos) Grassmarket				55°56′51″N 3°11′42″W	Category B	43496	Upload another image
5-9 (Odd Nos) Hill Street				55°57′13″N 3°12′07″W	Category A	43296	Upload Photo
37 Hill Street Lane North				55°57′13″N 3°12′10″W	Category B	43306	Upload Photo
3 Hope Street				55°57′02″N 3°12′28″W	Category B	43307	Upload Photo
38-40 North West Thistle Street Lane				55°57′14″N 3°12′02″W	Category C(S)	43312	Upload Photo
88-90 (Inclusive Nos) Princes Street				55°57′07″N 3°11′54″W	Category B	43323	Upload Photo
129 And 131 Rose Street				55°57′07″N 3°12′09″W	Category B	43331	Upload Photo
3 South West Thistle Street Lane				55°57′13″N 3°11′53″W	Category C(S)	43350	Upload Photo
41-45 (Odd Nos) Thistle Street				55°57′15″N 3°11′57″W	Category B	43357	Upload Photo
6 Young Street Lane South				55°57′10″N 3°12′20″W	Category B	43371	Upload Photo
4 Claverhouse Drive With Boundary Walls				55°55′03″N 3°09′14″W	Category B	43235	Upload Photo
6 Claverhouse Drive With Boundary Walls				55°55′03″N 3°09′16″W	Category C(S)	43236	Upload Photo
Frogston Road East, Mortonhall House, Dovecot				55°54′13″N 3°10′50″W	Category C(S)	43237	Upload Photo
Frogston Road East, Mortonhall House, Factor's House				55°54′15″N 3°10′52″W	Category C(S)	43238	Upload Photo
Gilmerton, The Drum, West Lodge, Gatepiers, Gates And Railings				55°54′31″N 3°07′13″W	Category B	43253	Upload Photo
40 And 42 George Street With Railings				55°57′12″N 3°11′53″W	Category C(S)	43289	Upload Photo
9 Cameron House Avenue, Cameron Nursery School				55°55′52″N 3°09′39″W	Category B	43142	Upload Photo
2-8 (Even Nos) Kilmaurs Terrace				55°56′03″N 3°10′00″W	Category C(S)	43154	Upload Photo
7 And 9 Marchhall Crescent				55°56′10″N 3°10′04″W	Category C(S)	43156	Upload Photo
2 Marchhall Road, Queens Park Nursing Home				55°56′13″N 3°10′04″W	Category C(S)	43158	Upload Photo
55 Peffermill Road, Morgan Lodge				55°55′56″N 3°09′19″W	Category C(S)	43164	Upload Photo
10 And 12 Priestfield Road (Priestville Guest House)				55°56′08″N 3°10′01″W	Category C(S)	43169	Upload Photo
23, 24 And 25 High Street				55°59′25″N 3°23′45″W	Category B	40379	Upload Photo
27, 28 And 29 High Street				55°59′24″N 3°23′44″W	Category B	40380	Upload Photo
58, 59, 60, 61 And 62 High Street, Including Railings And Boundary Walls				55°59′24″N 3°23′36″W	Category B	40384	Upload Photo
38 And 40 High Street And 21 East Terrace, Black Castle				55°59′23″N 3°23′42″W	Category A	40386	Upload another image
The Vennel, Old Burial Ground, Boundary Walls, Gatepiers, Bee-Boles And Monuments				55°59′22″N 3°23′43″W	Category B	40405	Upload Photo
West Terrace, Tolbooth				55°59′25″N 3°23′49″W	Category A	40411	Upload another image
Queensferry Harbour				55°59′31″N 3°23′46″W	Category B	40371	Upload another image
148 (Formerly 18) Whitehouse Loan The Elms Including Pedestrian Gateway, Gatepiers And Boundary Walls				55°55′56″N 3°12′03″W	Category B	30672	Upload Photo
9 Whitehouse Terrace Incl Gatepiers And Boundary Walls				55°55′55″N 3°11′38″W	Category B	30678	Upload Photo
44 (Formerly 42) South Oswald Road Scottish Agricultural College Including Gatepiers				55°55′44″N 3°11′42″W	Category B	30594	Upload Photo
15-17 Spottiswoode Street				55°56′19″N 3°11′54″W	Category B	30598	Upload Photo
6 Spottiswoode Street				55°56′21″N 3°11′52″W	Category B	30599	Upload Photo
88 Stratheran Rd St Margarets Tower Incl Gatepiers & Walls				55°56′03″N 3°11′57″W	Category B	30605	Upload Photo
49-51 (Odd Nos) Warrender Park Road				55°56′19″N 3°11′45″W	Category B	30620	Upload Photo
67 Warrender Park Road				55°56′19″N 3°11′50″W	Category B	30625	Upload Photo
69 Warrender Park Road				55°56′19″N 3°11′51″W	Category B	30626	Upload Photo
113-115 (Odd Nos) Warrender Park Road				55°56′17″N 3°11′59″W	Category B	30633	Upload Photo
102 Warrender Park Road Former Usher Institute				55°56′17″N 3°11′54″W	Category B	30644	Upload Photo
8-10 (Incl Nos) Warrender Park Terrace Including Railings				55°56′21″N 3°11′47″W	Category B	30647	Upload Photo
27-29 (Inclusive Nos) Warrender Park Terrace				55°56′21″N 3°11′56″W	Category B	30654	Upload Photo
32A Warrender Park Terrace				55°56′20″N 3°11′57″W	Category B	30656	Upload Photo
113A Whitehouse Loan Gillis College Former School				55°56′04″N 3°12′03″W	Category B	30663	Upload Photo
125 Grange Loan Incl Boundary Walls				55°55′51″N 3°11′33″W	Category B	30507	Upload Photo
8 Greenhill Gardens				55°56′09″N 3°12′20″W	Category B	30513	Upload Photo
42 Greenhill Gardens Roman Catholic Archiepiscopal Chapel				55°55′57″N 3°12′17″W	Category A	30521	Upload Photo
15 And 15A Greenhill Terrace				55°56′07″N 3°12′11″W	Category C(S)	30524	Upload Photo
2 & 4 Kilgraston Rd Incl Stable Block And Boundary Walls				55°56′00″N 3°11′38″W	Category B	30527	Upload Photo
23-29 Marchmont Cres & 32-34 Warrender Park Road				55°56′17″N 3°11′37″W	Category B	30531	Upload another image
57 Marchmont Road				55°56′14″N 3°11′39″W	Category B	30549	Upload Photo
118-122 (Even Nos) Marchmont Road				55°56′09″N 3°11′41″W	Category B	30564	Upload Photo
124 Marchmont Road 2 And 4 Thirlestane Road				55°56′08″N 3°11′41″W	Category B	30565	Upload Photo
2 Marchmont Street				55°56′18″N 3°12′03″W	Category B	30569	Upload Photo
35 Mortonhall Rd With Lamp Posts Boundary Walls Gates & Gate				55°55′38″N 3°11′41″W	Category A	30579	Upload Photo
4 And 4A Mortonhall R0Ad Cardon Including Gatepiers And Boundary Walls				55°55′41″N 3°11′21″W	Category B	30580	Upload Photo
5-9 (Odd (Nos) Roseneath Terrace				55°56′21″N 3°11′32″W	Category B	30466	Upload another image
5 And 7 Sciennes House Place, Formerly Sciennes Hill House				55°56′16″N 3°10′55″W	Category B	30477	Upload another image
3 And 3A South Lauder Road And 52 Fountainhall Road, Claremont, Including Gatepiers, Pedestrian Gateways And Boundary Walls				55°55′54″N 3°10′56″W	Category B	30482	Upload Photo
1 Alvanley Terrace & 153-161 (Odd Nos)Warrender Park Road				55°56′15″N 3°12′09″W	Category B	30492	Upload Photo
56 Fountainhall Road				55°55′53″N 3°11′00″W	Category C(S)	30378	Upload Photo
60 Fountainhall Road Including Boundary Wall And Gatepiers				55°55′52″N 3°11′04″W	Category C(S)	30379	Upload Photo
Grange Loan And Lover's Loan, Pillar Surmounted By Wyvern				55°55′53″N 3°11′13″W	Category B	30380	Upload another image
Kilgraston Road, Marchmont St Giles Church (Formerly Grange Parish Church) Including Church Hall, 1A Kilgraston Road (Church Officer's House), And Boundary Walls				55°56′03″N 3°11′35″W	Category B	30400	Upload another image
1 Kilgraston Road And 11 Beaufort Road				55°56′04″N 3°11′36″W	Category B	30401	Upload Photo
41 And 43 Lauder Road				55°56′12″N 3°11′15″W	Category B	30408	Upload Photo
45 And 47 Lauder Road				55°56′13″N 3°11′16″W	Category B	30409	Upload Photo
49 And 51 Lauder Road				55°56′14″N 3°11′16″W	Category B	30410	Upload Photo
18B And 18C Lauder Road, Northwood House, Including Gatepiers And Boundary Walls				55°56′01″N 3°11′11″W	Category C(S)	30412	Upload Photo
20 Lauder Road And 31B Dick Place, Including Boundary Wall And Pedestrian Gateways				55°56′02″N 3°11′12″W	Category C(S)	30413	Upload Photo
42 Lauder Road				55°56′12″N 3°11′19″W	Category B	30417	Upload Photo
44 Lauder Road				55°56′13″N 3°11′19″W	Category B	30418	Upload Photo
4 Mansionhouse Road				55°56′14″N 3°11′22″W	Category C(S)	30428	Upload Photo
24 Mansionhouse Road				55°56′06″N 3°11′18″W	Category B	30429	Upload Photo
26 And 26A Mansionhouse Road				55°56′06″N 3°11′17″W	Category B	30430	Upload Photo
21 Dean Park Street, St Bernard's Education Centre (Formerly St Bernard's Primary School), Including Janitor's House, Gates, Gatepiers And Boundary Railings				55°57′28″N 3°12′52″W	Category B	30316	Upload Photo
137 Dundee Street, Fountainbridge Public Library				55°56′24″N 3°13′06″W	Category B	30322	Upload Photo
57 Albion Road, Norton Park Annexe Technical Block, With Outbuilding, Boundary Walls, Gatepiers, Gates And Railings				55°57′41″N 3°10′00″W	Category B	30323	Upload Photo
4 And 5 Argyle Place				55°56′21″N 3°11′28″W	Category C(S)	30334	Upload Photo
15-17 (Inclusive) Argyle Place				55°56′18″N 3°11′30″W	Category B	30337	Upload another image
6 Chalmers Crescent				55°56′14″N 3°11′27″W	Category C(S)	30348	Upload Photo
10 Chalmers Crescent With Boundary Walls And Gatepiers				55°56′12″N 3°11′27″W	Category B	30349	Upload Photo
3 And 3A Dalrymple Crescent Including Boundary Wall				55°56′01″N 3°11′00″W	Category B	30350	Upload Photo
9 And 11 Dick Place Including Boundary Walls				55°56′05″N 3°10′57″W	Category C(S)	30353	Upload Photo
55 Dick Place				55°55′59″N 3°11′30″W	Category B	30354	Upload Photo
8 And 8A Dick Place And Carriage House				55°56′03″N 3°10′57″W	Category B	30360	Upload another image
18 And 18A Dick Place				55°56′03″N 3°11′03″W	Category B	30361	Upload Photo
36 And 36A Dick Place, Hazelwood With Gates, Gatepiers And Boundary Walls				55°56′01″N 3°11′16″W	Category B	30362	Upload Photo
40 And 42 Dick Place				55°55′59″N 3°11′22″W	Category B	30366	Upload Photo
36 Findhorn Place Including Boundary Walls And Pedestrian Gateway				55°56′05″N 3°10′51″W	Category B	30369	Upload another image
Cramond Glebe Road, K6 Telephone Kiosk At The Cramond Inn				55°58′46″N 3°18′01″W	Category B	30228	Upload Photo
Lawnmarket (South Side) Telephone Kiosk				55°56′58″N 3°11′35″W	Category B	30232	Upload another image
Market Street And Waverley Bridge, Police Box				55°57′03″N 3°11′30″W	Category B	30239	Upload another image
Dean Terrace, Police Box				55°57′28″N 3°12′33″W	Category B	30241	Upload Photo
1-48 (Inclusive Nos) Ravelston Garden				55°57′07″N 3°14′51″W	Category A	30264	Upload Photo
The Vennel, Former Portsburgh Chapel, Including Boundary Wall, Railings, Gate And Gateway				55°56′47″N 3°11′51″W	Category B	30266	Upload another image
6 New Market Road, St Cuthbert`S Association Cattle Depot				55°55′37″N 3°14′50″W	Category B	30280	Upload Photo
8-9 New Market Road, Newmarket Pockets, Former Market Refreshment Rooms				55°55′38″N 3°14′51″W	Category C(S)	30281	Upload Photo
69-71 Whitehill Street, Newcraighall Parish Church And Church Hall Including Boundary Walls				55°56′07″N 3°05′16″W	Category C(S)	30286	Upload Photo
9 Easter Belmont Road				55°56′51″N 3°15′20″W	Category C(S)	30294	Upload Photo
22 Russell Place, South Gothic Cottage, With Boundary Wall				55°58′42″N 3°12′18″W	Category B	30156	Upload Photo
299 Colinton Road, Inchdrewer, With Boundary Wall, Gatepiers And Outbuildings				55°54′35″N 3°14′59″W	Category B	30212	Upload Photo
152-55 (Consecutive Nos) Lower Granton Road, Including Gatepiers And Rear Outbuildings				55°58′50″N 3°13′19″W	Category B	30213	Upload Photo
Craiglockhart House Craiglockhart Dell Road And Craiglockhart Loan				55°55′15″N 3°14′50″W	Category B	30055	Upload Photo
50-54A (Even Nos) Broughton Street, Including Railings				55°57′31″N 3°11′25″W	Category B	30072	Upload Photo
3 And 5 Gayfield Street Including Boundary Wall				55°57′33″N 3°11′12″W	Category C(S)	30098	Upload Photo
16 George Street				55°57′12″N 3°11′46″W	Category C(S)	30106	Upload Photo
1A, 1-4 Inverleith Row And 1A Inverleith Terrace				55°57′52″N 3°12′11″W	Category B	30120	Upload Photo
Lanark Road 45 Old Manse, Slateford				55°55′20″N 3°14′56″W	Category B	30122	Upload Photo
40 Lauriston Street				55°56′42″N 3°12′03″W	Category B	30128	Upload Photo
57-61A (Odd Nos) York Place, Including Railings				55°57′23″N 3°11′19″W	Category A	29972	Upload Photo
18 York Place, Including Railings				55°57′23″N 3°11′30″W	Category A	29982	Upload Photo
26 York Place, Including Railings And Lamps				55°57′23″N 3°11′27″W	Category A	29986	Upload Photo
28 York Place, Including Railings And Lamps				55°57′23″N 3°11′27″W	Category A	29987	Upload Photo
30 York Place, Including Railings And Lamp				55°57′23″N 3°11′26″W	Category A	29988	Upload Photo
38 York Place, Including Railings And Lamp				55°57′24″N 3°11′24″W	Category A	29992	Upload Photo
13 Young Street				55°57′11″N 3°12′20″W	Category A	30001	Upload Photo
7 East Broughton Place And 11, 12 Gayfield Street (Former Broughton St Mary's Church Centre)				55°57′32″N 3°11′13″W	Category B	30010	Upload Photo
Greenside Place, Lady Glenorchy's Church				55°57′24″N 3°11′08″W	Category C(S)	30011	Upload another image
26 Lauriston Street, Lauriston Hall (Halls And Presbytery Of Church Of Sacred Heart)				55°56′42″N 3°12′04″W	Category B	30013	Upload Photo
West Savile Terrace And Blackford Avenue, Reid Memorial Church, Including Cloister, Church Officer's House, Session House, Hall, Loggia And Boundary Walls				55°55′35″N 3°11′03″W	Category A	30015	Upload Photo
45 Lanark Road, Former Slateford UP Church, Including Gateway To Lanark Road				55°55′21″N 3°14′57″W	Category B	30017	Upload Photo
21-31 (Odd Nos) Lothian Road, Former Caley Cinema				55°56′54″N 3°12′22″W	Category B	30021	Upload another image
Broughton Road And 154 Mcdonald Road, Broughton Schools With Janitor's House And Playshelter, Boundary Walls, Gatepiers And Railings				55°57′56″N 3°11′18″W	Category B	30041	Upload Photo
Donaldson's School For The Deaf Lodges And Gates, Henderson Row				55°57′37″N 3°12′20″W	Category B	30042	Upload Photo
Edinburgh Academy West Lodge, Railings And Gates, Henderson Row				55°57′37″N 3°12′19″W	Category B	30043	Upload Photo

== Key ==
The scheme for classifying buildings in Scotland is:

- Category A: "buildings of national or international importance, either architectural or historic; or fine, little-altered examples of some particular period, style or building type."
- Category B: "buildings of regional or more than local importance; or major examples of some particular period, style or building type, which may have been altered."
- Category C: "buildings of local importance; lesser examples of any period, style, or building type, as originally constructed or moderately altered; and simple traditional buildings which group well with other listed buildings."

In March 2016 there were 47,288 listed buildings in Scotland. Of these, 8% were Category A, and 50% were Category B, with the remaining 42% being Category C.

== See also ==
- List of listed buildings in Edinburgh
