= Dundas Castle =

Castle in West Lothian, Scotland

Coordinates: 55.9750859°N 3.4145594°W

- Edinburgh, Scotland
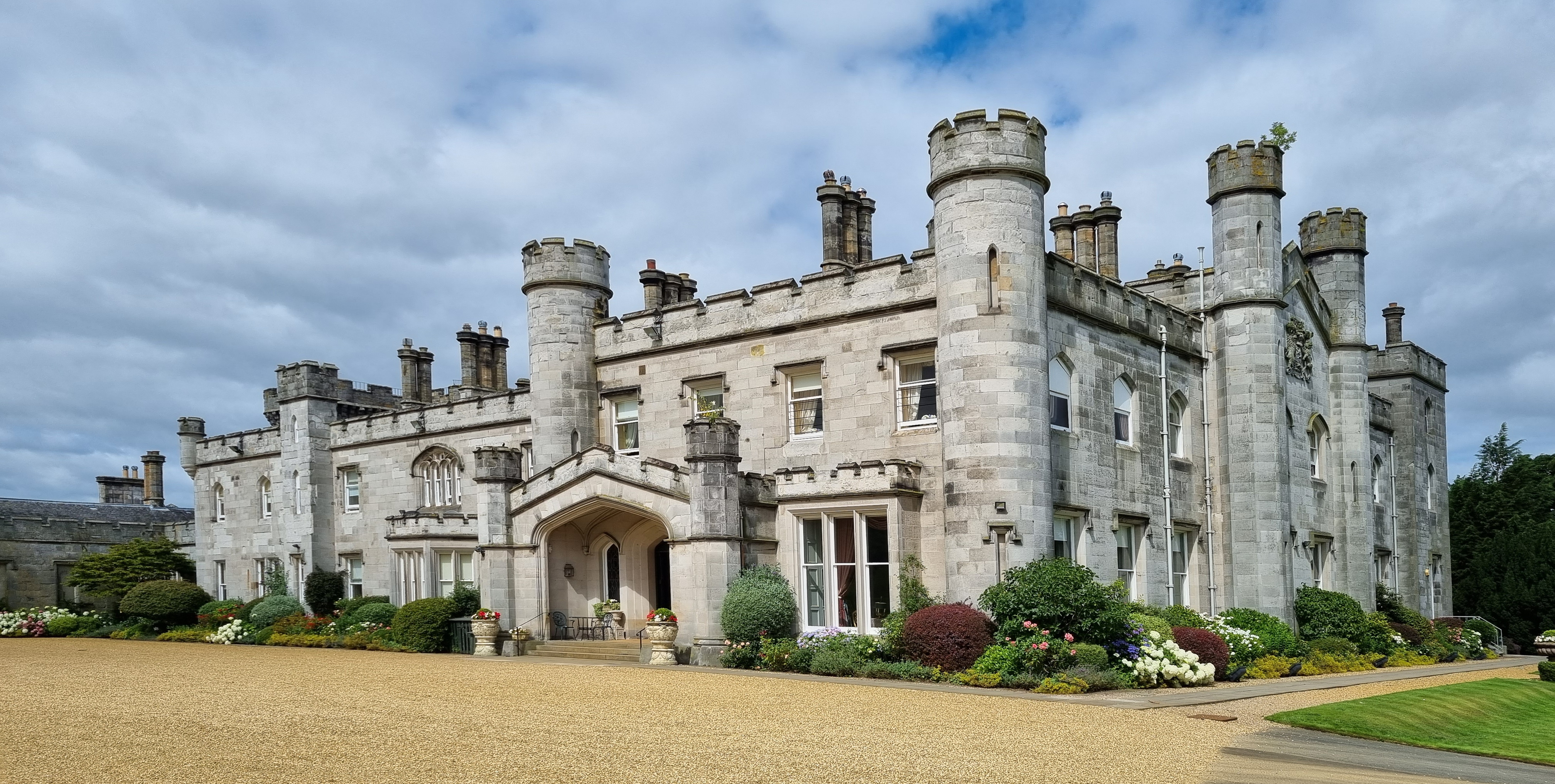
- The south front of the castle with porch

Site information
- Open to the public: The castle can be rented for weddings and other special events
- Website: dundascastle.co.uk

Location
- Location within the City of Edinburgh council area

Site history
- Built: 15th century
- Materials: Stone

Designations

Inventory of Gardens and Designed Landscapes in Scotland
- Official name: Dundas Castle
- Designated: 30 March 2001
- Reference no.: GDL00151

Dundas Castle is a 15th-century castle, with substantial 19th-century additions by William Burn, near South Queensferry, on the outskirts of Edinburgh, Scotland. The home of the Dundas family since the Middle Ages, it was sold in the late 19th century and was the residence of politician and businessman Sir Jack Stewart-Clark. The tower house and the adjoining Tudor-Gothic mansion are listed separately as Category A buildings, and the grounds are included in Inventory of Gardens and Designed Landscapes in Scotland.

== History ==
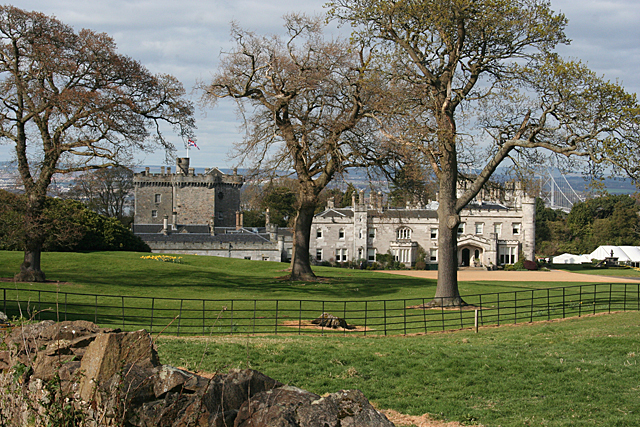
View showing the original tower house (left)

The name Dundas comes from the Gaelic dùn deas, meaning "south hill" or "pretty hill". In the 11th century, the lands of Dundas, along with other land in Lothian, were granted by King Malcolm Canmore to paternal first cousin Gospatrick, the earl of Northumbria, who had come north to escape William the Conqueror. The lands of Dundas passed to his great-grandson Waldeve, who granted them to his kinsman Helias in a charter dating from around 1180. Helias took his surname from his lands, becoming the first of the Dundas family. The Dundases and their cadets would later come to own much of Mid and West Lothian.

In 1416, James Dundas obtained a licence from the Duke of Albany (then the effective ruler of Scotland) to build a keep. This keep was extended in 1436, making it into an L-plan. The Keep served both as a home in times of peace and a fortress in times of war. Regent Arran gave a tip to workmen building the "Place of Dundas" in July 1544. On 13 August 1553 in the great hall, James Dundas gave his infant daughters Elizabeth and Jane gifts of silver plate.

Oliver Cromwell is known to have stayed at Dundas Castle around the time of the Battle of Dunbar in 1650. A statue of him remains standing outside the Keep.

In 1818, James Dundas had the 17th-century portion of the building pulled down and rebuilt in a Tudor-Gothic style by the renowned architect William Burn. Burn also designed many churches and this influence is visible throughout the building. Burn's designs for the main state rooms allow for huge windows that look out on to lawns and parkland outside.

The building and extensive gardens had cost so much to construct that the Dundases were forced to sell the castle and lands in 1875. The buyer was William Russell. It was again sold in 1899, when it was bought along with five farms and 1,500 acres (600 hectares) of agricultural land by Stewart Clark, the owner of a Renfrewshire textile company and a respected philanthropist. Clark's son, John, took the double-barreled name "Stewart-Clark" in honour of his father, and was made a baronet in 1918.

During the Second World War, Dundas Castle served as the headquarters for protecting the Forth Bridge. From 1995 to 2026, the castle's owner was Sir Jack Stewart-Clark, the great-grandson of Stewart Clark. Sir Jack was a Member of the European Parliament between 1979 and 1999.

== Facilities ==
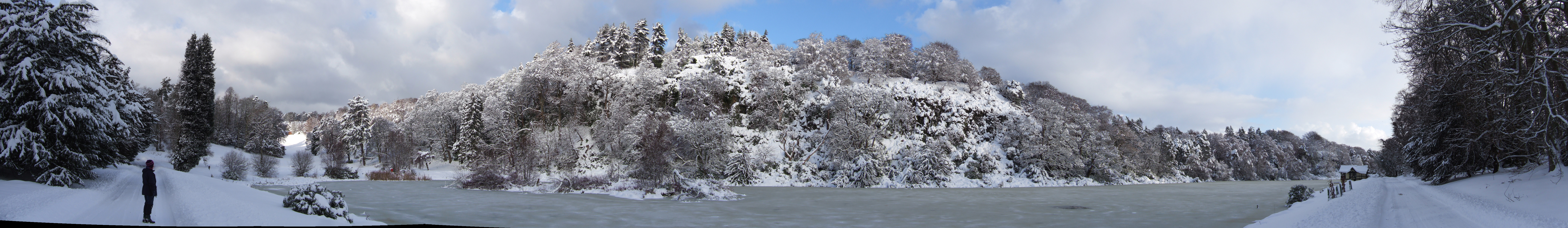
Dundas Loch in the winter

By the time Sir Jack inherited the property from his mother in 1995, it had deteriorated substantially. He initially considered selling it, but instead chose to embark on a programme of restoration. The Keep, uninhabited for over 300 years, had its parapet rebuilt and its stonework restored, and it was installed with electricity, heating, lavatory and a kitchen. The dry rot in the castle itself was removed, and the drawing room, library and dining room were redecorated. The castle is now a 5-star exclusive venue, often used for weddings.

In the grounds of the castle is a holiday cottage called the Boathouse, situated on the shore of Dundas Loch. It is a 4-star self-catering venue.

Dundas Castle is a member of Unique Venues of Edinburgh and Luxury Edinburgh

=== Film and TV location ===
Dundas Castle has been used as a backdrop in films The Little Vampire (2000), Summer Solstice (2005), and Book of Blood (2009), Princess Switch 3'' (2020), Christmas in Scotland'' (2023), Borges and Me'' (2024), Department Q Season One'' (2024) Sardaar JI 3'' (2025) and King of the Iron Will'' (2026). It appeared in the music video for the Weeknd song Popular (2024), at the 15 second mark. It has also been used for adverts for Arnold Clark and T4’s links between shows.

== Gallery ==
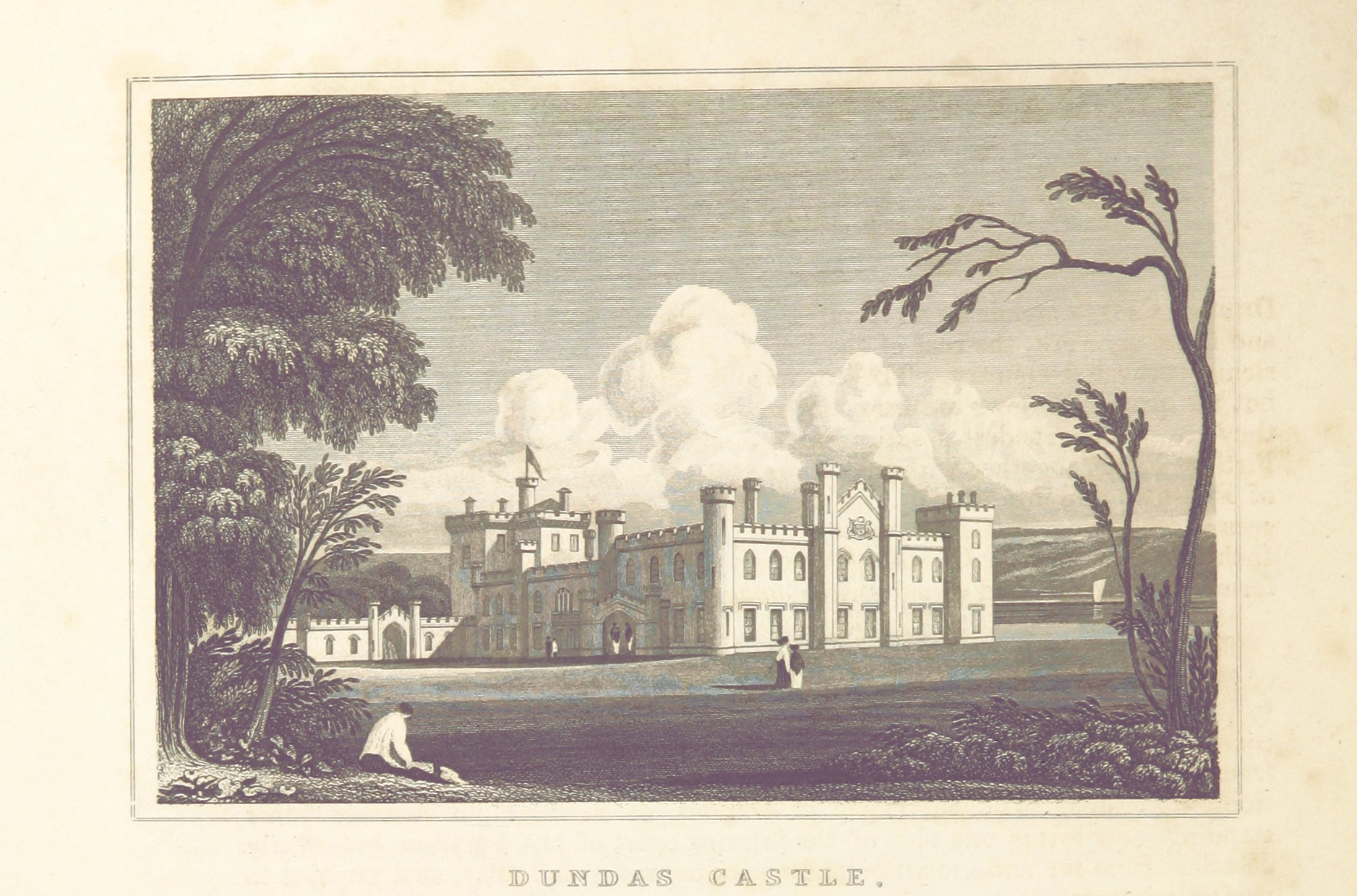
1829 drawing by Thomas Shepherd

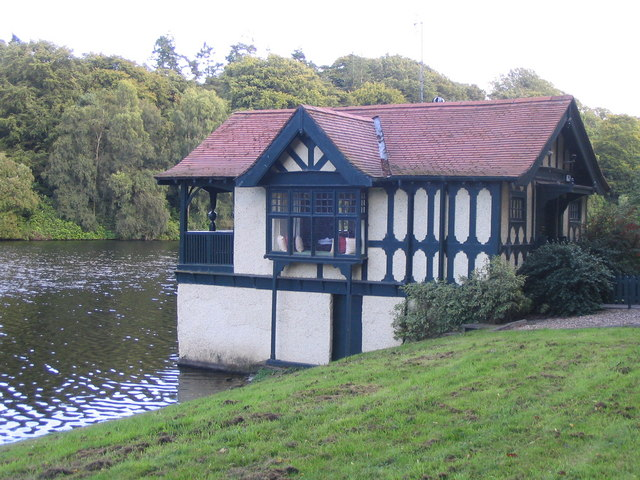
The Boathouse

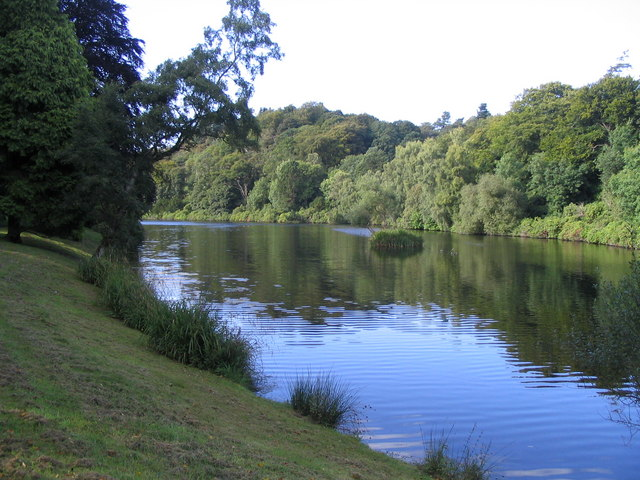
Another view of the loch

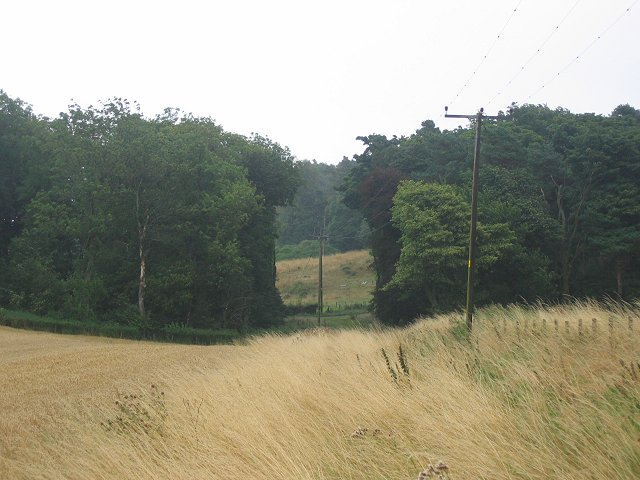
Part of the grounds

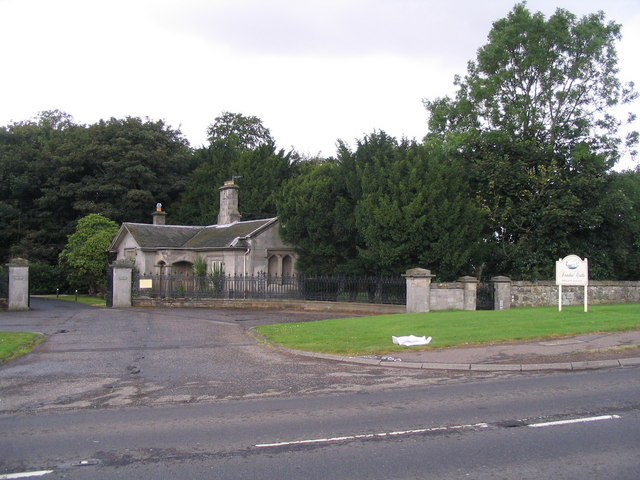
Entrance to the estate

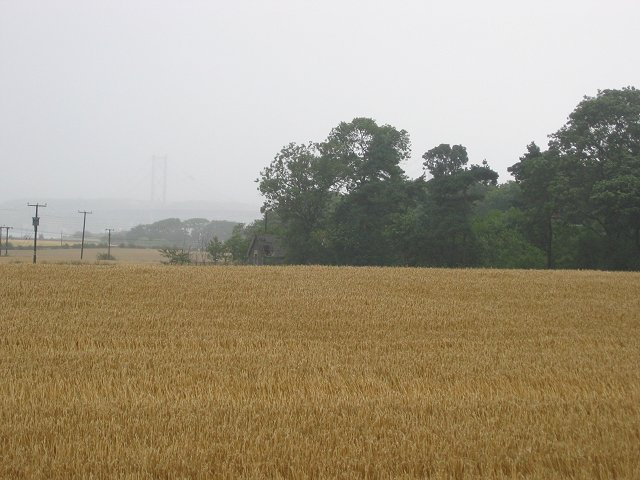
The edge of the estate, with the Forth Road Bridge in the background
