= Southampton Passion =

The Southampton Passion logo

The Southampton Passion was a passion play about the last few days of the life of Jesus. It took place in Guildhall Square, at the heart of the Cultural Quarter of Southampton, against the backdrop of the Southampton Guildhall.

The event took place on Good Friday, 22 April 2011 to an estimated crowd of 10,000. More than 70 actors and a 100-strong choir performed in the play, written and organised by Neil Maddock who has also been cast in the leading role of 33-year-old Jesus.

The performance is produced by e-quip Community Arts Project.

== Music ==
The play featured original songs and underscore by composer Nathan Hattersley.

Musical item	Written by
Hosanna	Neil Maddock and Nathan Hattersley
In The Darkness	Neil Maddock and Nathan Hattersley
The Last Supper	Nathan Hattersley
We Believe	Neil Maddock and Nathan Hattersley
All For You	Neil Maddock and Nathan Hattersley
Crucifixion	Nathan Hattersley
I Loved Him	Nathan Hattersley
Go	Neil Maddock and Nathan Hattersley
What Does It Mean For Me?	Nathan Hattersley

=== Original cast recording ===
The Southampton Passion Original Cast Recording is a cast recording of the songs as performed by the original cast members and 100-piece choir.

== Original cast ==
Actor	Role
Neil Maddock	Jesus
Leigh Barnard	Peter
Tony Skinner	Matthew
Zak Venable	James
Joe Venable	John
Pete Hamilton	Andrew
Kevin Mott	Thaddeus
Mark Allen	Bartholomew (Bart)
Alan Bridges	Simon
Richard Eyles	James (Jimmy)
Joshua McDonald	Thomas
Andy Finn	Philip
Chris Åland	Judas
Robyn-Jane Parsons	Mary, Mother of Jesus
Ophelia Matthias	Mary Magdalene
Kimberley Wren	Salome
Miriam Malak	Naomi
Amy Coombes	Esther
Simon Clift	Joseph of Arimathea
Graeme Clements	Caiaphas
Steve Braithwaite	Annas
Mike Combs	Machir
Graham Prior	Alpheus
Nigel Forder	Priest
Barry Brand	Temple Guard
Pete Drew	Temple Guard
Geoff Dodsworth	Pilate
Judy Schildhouse	Proculla
Becky Brearley	Alex
Eamonn Carey	Vituvius
Pete Walton	Domitian
Pete Reynolds	Marcus
Darren Blakeman	Aurelius
Melvin Proud	Barabbas
Barney Ridgwell	Gustus
Tom Orchard	Syrus
Steve McIntyre	News Seller
Dan Coghlan	Angel Gabriel
Cliff Blake	Witness

== Trivia ==
Act III, Scene 3 was not acted live; a pre-recorded scene was to be shown on video screens but was not due to technical issues, though the sound was played. It was filmed at Wolvesey Palace, which is the residence of the Bishop of Winchester. The scene, set in Pilate's palace, depicts Joseph of Arimathea requesting of Pilate the body of Jesus.
