= Julia Cross =

Scottish taekwon-do practitioner

- Born: 29 March 1974 (age 50); Edinburgh, Scotland
- Occupation(s): Taekwon-Do competitor (retired); Taekwon-Do Instructor
- Years active: 1991–2010

Julia Margaret Cross MBE is a 7th degree black belt in ITF Taekwon-Do and a martial arts instructor. She is a six-time ITF Taekwon-Do World Champion and 15 time European Champion. Julia Cross is the only person, male or female, ever to achieve six world titles in ITF Taekwon-Do.

== Career ==
Julia Cross took her first martial arts class at age eleven. In 1991 she traveled to Vienna for her first European championship. She became a world champion for the first time in 1999, in Argentina. She continued to win world titles and was inducted into the Taekwon-Do Hall of Fame in 2007, being the first person to ever win six Taekwon-Do world titles. In 2010, Julia Cross needed a hip replacement and was forced to retire from competition. She received her 5th degree black belt in 2011, and teaches at South Queensferry School of Taekwon-Do.4

Cross was appointed Member of the Order of the British Empire (MBE) in the 2020 Birthday Honours for services to taekwon-do.

== Titles ==
Julia Cross has won numerous titles in her Taekwon-Do career.

- WORLD SILVER 2009: ARGENTINA - Female -58 kg Sparring
- 2007: QUEBEC - Female -58 kg Sparring
- Winner of 1st Hall of Fame Best Female Competitor
- 2005: GERMANY - Female -58 kg Sparring
- 2005: GERMANY - Female 3rd degree Patterns
- Received Award for Best Overall Female
- 2003: POLAND - Female -58 kg Sparring
- 2003: POLAND - Female 3rd Degree Patterns
- Received Award for Best overall female
- 1999: ARGENTINA - Female -58 kg Sparring
- Received Award For Best Overall Female
- WORLD SILVER 1997: RUSSIA - Female 3rd degree Patterns
- WORLD BRONZE 1992: NORTH KOREA - Female -58 kg Sparring
- European Championship Medals European Golds - 15
- 1991: Vienna
- 1994: Poland
- 1996: Italy
- 1997: Slovenia
- 1999: Italy
- 2000: Edinburgh - 2 Gold including BEST FEMALE COMPETITOR
- 2001: Spain
- 2002: Czech Rep -1 Gold & 1 Silver including BEST FEMALE COMPETITOR
- 2004: Finland
- 2005: Italy
- 2006: Romania
- 2007: Slovakia - 2 GOLD including BEST OVERALL FEMALE
- 2008: Wroclaw - Poland
- SILVER MEDALS - 5
- 1993: Holland
- 1995: Germany
- 1999: Italy
- 2001: Spain
- 2002: Czech Rep
- 2008: Wroclaw-Poland
- BRONZE MEDALS - 3
- 1991: Vienna
- 1995: Germany
- 2006: Romania
- Other Tournaments
- FINNISH OPEN (FINLAND): CHAMPION 2003 - 2 Gold Medals
- SWEDISH VIKING CUP: CHAMPION 2004 - 2 Gold Medals
- SWEDISH VIKING CUP: CHAMPION 2005 - 2 Gold Medals
- SWEDISH VIKING CUP: CHAMPION 2006 - 1 Gold, 1 Silver
- CHAMPION OF CHAMPIONS (ENGLAND) 2004 - 3 Gold Medals
- IMPACT OPEN 2005 - 2 Gold Medals
- SCOTTISH CHAMPION: 1989-2003(inclusive), 2006 BRITISH CHAMPION: 1989-2002(inclusive) ENGLISH CHAMPION: 1989, 1990 and 1998 WELSH CHAMPION: 1995 and 1997 ITALIAN OPEN CHAMPION: 1998, 1999 and 2000 - 2 gold medals in each year
- IRISH OPEN MARCH 2007: GOLD SPARRING & GOLD PATTERN
