= South Queensferry =

Coordinates: 55.990°N 3.398°W

South Queensferry: Scottish Gaelic: Port na Banrighinn
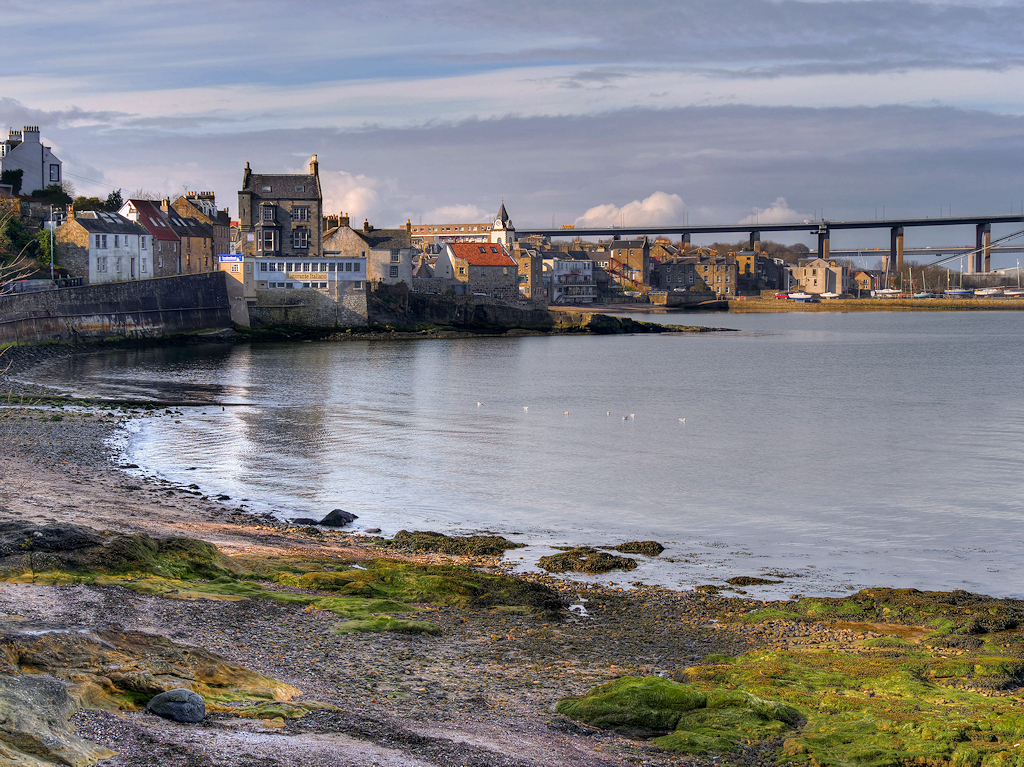
- South Queensferry from the foreshore

- Location within Edinburgh
- Population: 10,400 (2020)
- OS grid reference: NT129783
- Council area: Edinburgh
- Lieutenancy area: Edinburgh
- Country: Scotland
- Sovereign state: United Kingdom
- Post town: SOUTH QUEENSFERRY
- Postcode district: EH30
- Dialling code: 0131
- Police: Scotland
- Fire: Scottish
- Ambulance: Scottish
- UK Parliament: Edinburgh West
- Scottish Parliament: Edinburgh Western

South Queensferry, also known simply as Queensferry or The Ferry, is a town to the west of Edinburgh, Scotland. Traditionally a royal burgh of West Lothian, it is now administered by the City of Edinburgh Council. It lies ten miles to the north-west of Edinburgh city centre, on the southern shore of the Firth of Forth, between the Forth Rail Bridge, the Forth Road Bridge and the Queensferry Crossing.

The prefix South distinguishes the town from North Queensferry, on the opposite shore of the Forth. Both towns derive their name from the ferry service established by Queen Margaret in the 11th century, which continued to operate at the town until 1964, when the Road Bridge was opened.

South Queensferry has been named the most beautiful town in Scotland following a 2025 Telegraph study of 1,250 towns across the United Kingdom.

The 2022 census counted 10,216 residents in South Queensferry. Its population at the 2011 census was 9,026 based on the 2010 definition of the locality, which in addition to the burgh included Dalmeny.

== Toponymy ==
The earliest reference to Queensferry occurs in a source from the mid-12th century, which mentions Portus Regine ("the queen's port"). Later sources refer to Passagium Regine, or in full, Passagium Sancte Margarete Regine ("the ferry of Saint Margaret the queen"). Margaret (d. 1093) was the wife of King Malcolm Canmore, and was celebrated for her piety. Regarding the origins of Queensferry, the hagiographer Turgot of Durham writes:

Since the church of St Andrews is frequented by the religious devotion of visitors from the peoples round about, [Margaret] had built dwellings on either shore of the sea that separates Lothian and Scotland, so that pilgrims and poor might turn aside there to rest, after the labour of the journey, and might find there ready everything that necessity might require for the restoration of the body. She appointed attendants for this purpose alone, to have always ready all that was needed for guests, and to wait upon them with great care. She provided for them also ships, to carry them across, both going and returning, without ever demanding any price for the passage from those who were to be taken over.

A Gaelic source of 17th-century date refers to the town as Caschilis, i.e. Cas-chaolas, "deep or sudden strait". The name used by Ainmean-Àite na h-Alba, however, is Port na Banrighinn, translating the English.

== Local traditions ==
=== Christmas in Queensferry ===
A local showcase of talent and celebration takes place in preparation for Christmas. The community gathers together for a series of performances from the town's local people. The night ends with a firework display and a switch on of the town's Christmas lights and decorations.

=== The Ferry Fair ===
A local fair dates from the 12th century. The modern fair, dating from the 1930s, takes place each August and includes the crowning of a local school-girl as the Ferry Fair Queen, accompanied by a Ferry Fair Court of other school-children, a procession of floats, pipe bands, and competitive events such as the Boundary Race. The Fair had a dedicated radio station, Jubilee1, which in May 2007 was awarded a licence to evolve into a full Public Service Community Station for North and South Queensferry.

=== The Burryman ===
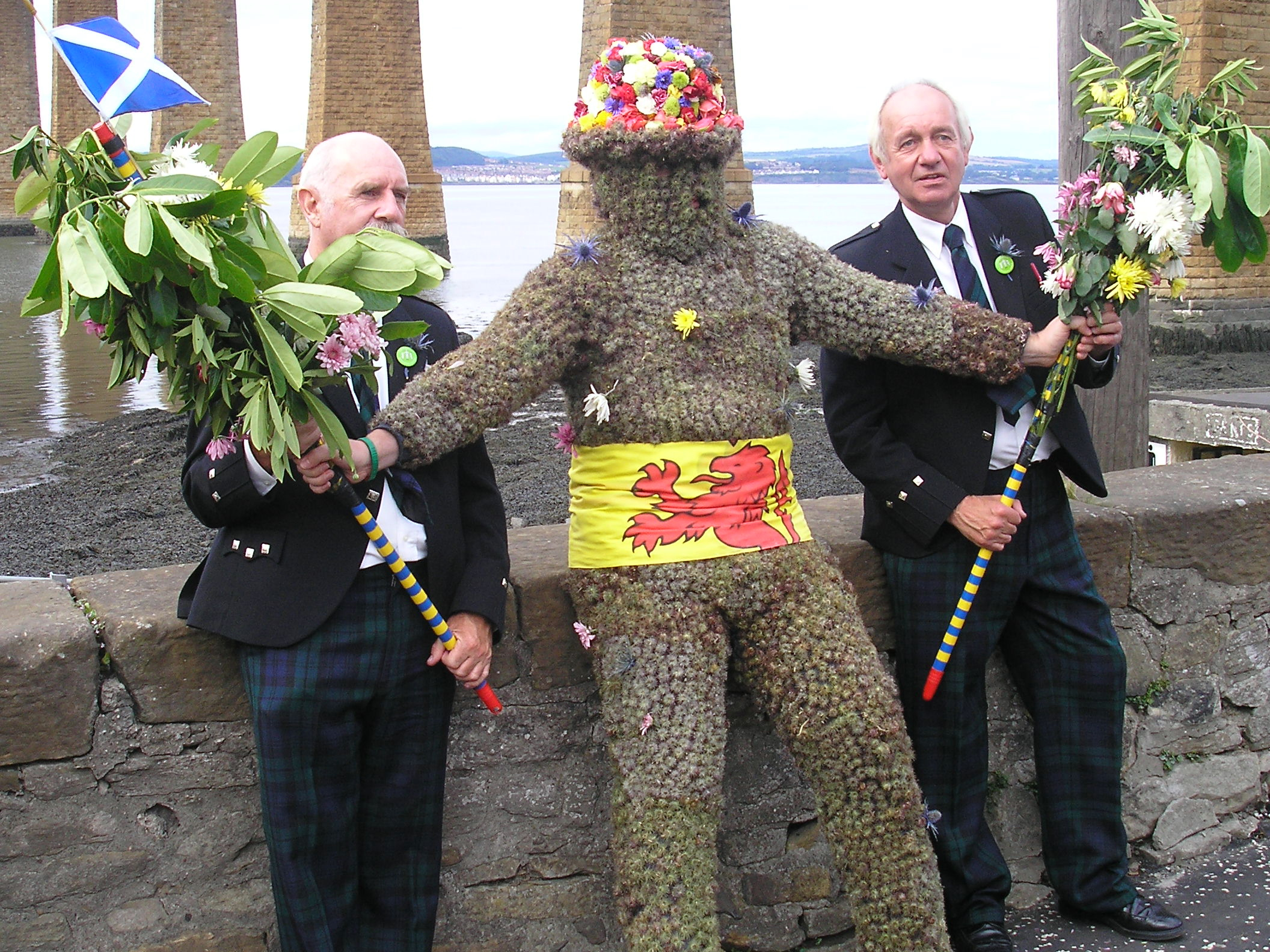
The Burry Man takes a rest supported by his two attendants.

Queensferry hosts the strange annual procession of the Burry Man during the Ferry Fair. This unique cultural event is over three hundred years old, and likely pagan in origin. The name "Burry Man" almost certainly refers to the hooked fruits of the burdock plant – burrs – in which he is covered, although some have suggested that it is a corruption of "Burgh Man", since the town was historically a royal burgh.

A local man is covered from head-to-toe in sticky burrs which adhere to undergarments covering his entire body, leaving only the shoes, hands and two eye holes exposed. On top of this layer he wears a sash, flowers and a floral hat and he grasps two staves. His ability to bend his arms or sit down is very restricted during the long day and his progress is a slow walk with frequent pauses. Two attendants in ordinary clothes assist him throughout the ordeal, helping him hold the staves, guiding his route, and fortifying him with whisky sipped through a straw, whilst enthusiastic children go from door-to-door collecting money on his behalf. The key landmarks on the tour are the Provost's office and each pub in the village.

=== The Loony Dook ===
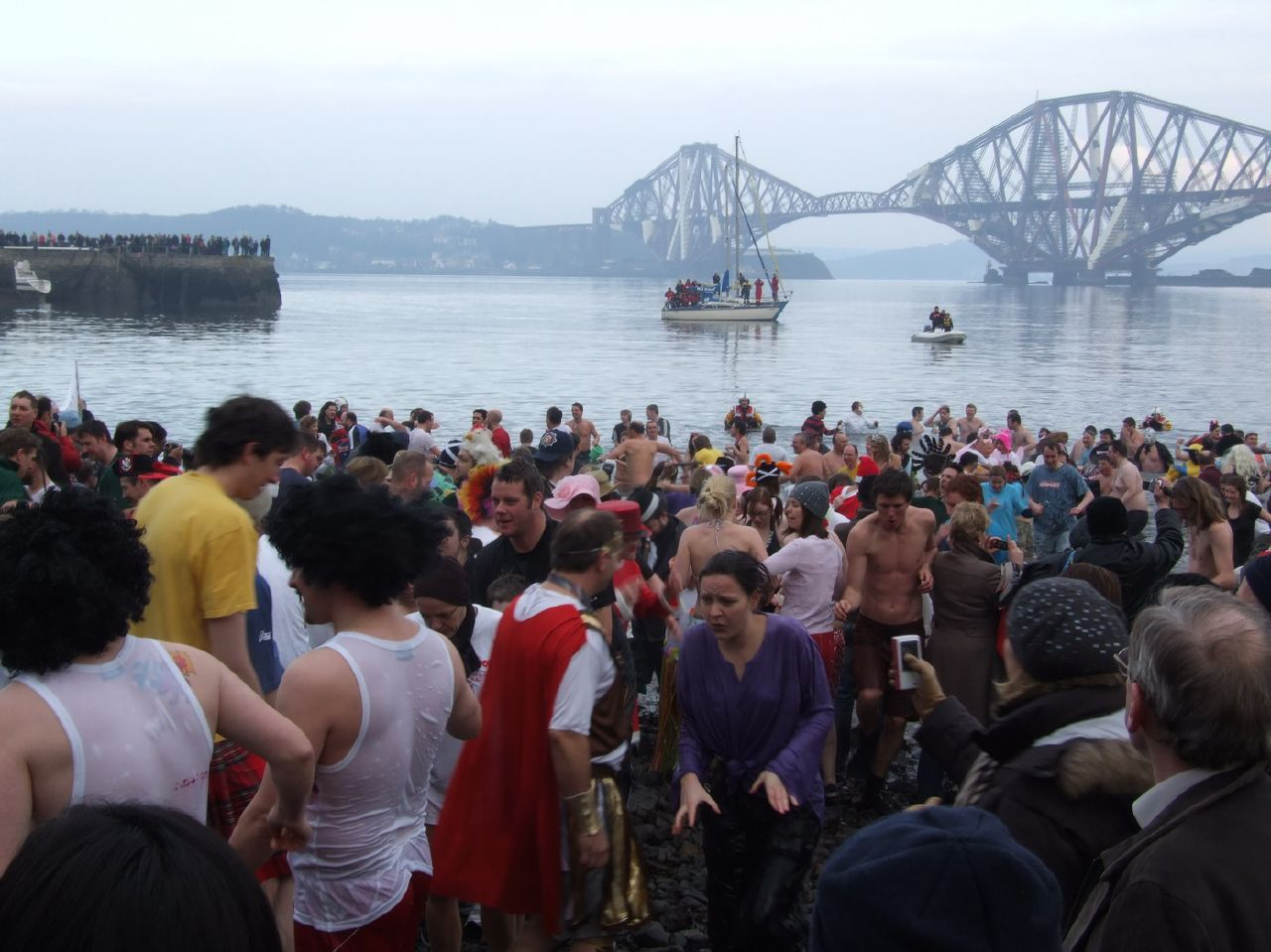
The 2009 Loony Dook

The name "Loony dook" is a combination of "Loony" (short for "lunatic") and "dook", a Scots term meaning "dip" or "bathe", and is an event whereby people dive into the freezing waters of the Firth of Forth on New Year's Day, often in fancy dress. In recent years the event has attracted people from all over the world, including many people visiting Edinburgh to celebrate Hogmanay. A proposal to charge people to participate in this event was introduced in 2011, the proceeds of which benefit RNLI Queensferry.

The event was conceived in 1986 as a joking suggestion by three locals for a New Year's Day hangover cure. The following year it was decided to repeat the event for charity. It has grown to become part of the official Edinburgh Hogmanay celebrations although originally organised solely by locals who utilised facilities at the Queensferry Arms Hotel (now Orocco Pier) for many years for access and changing before and after the event. As the popularity of the event grew participants later paraded ahead of the dook from the Moorings pub (now the Inchcolm) but from 2011, due to factors such as increased crowds, safety issues and popularity, the event has been handled by the organisers of Edinburgh's Hogmanay, with the parade now starting from the Hawes Promenade at the other end of the town. Up to 2016 two of the original Dookers, James MacKenzie and Ian 'Rambo' Armstrong, have the distinction of taking part in every Loony Dook and the two wore specially designed T-shirts with 30yrs to celebrate the achievement.

The event has inspired similar, though smaller in scale, annual New Year Loony Dooks, such as in North Berwick in East Lothian and Kirkcaldy in Fife, both also on the Firth of Forth.

=== Brass band ===
Queensferry has a community brass band that evolved from being a school brass band to a youth band and finally to its present status as a competing adult band. It came third in the 2006 Scottish Brass Band Championships 4th section contest and fourth in 2007. In addition to competing, it takes part in many community events including the Ferry Fair and Christmas in Queensferry light switch-on event. There is also a school brass band that has won the Community section of the Scottish Youth Brass Band Championships in 2005 and 2006.

== Places of interest ==
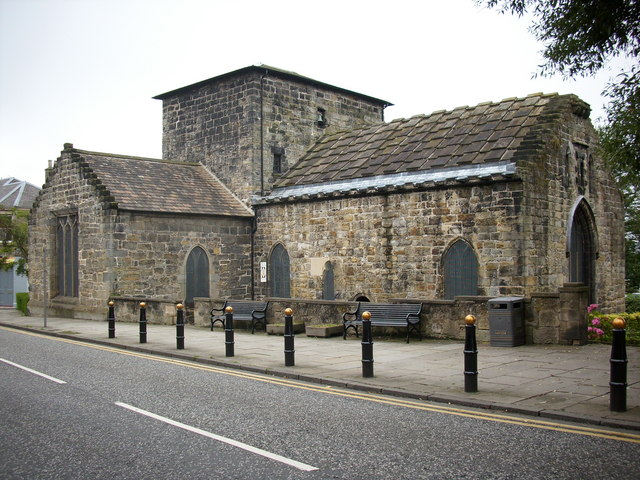
St Mary's Episcopal Church, formerly a Carmelite monastery, dates from the 1450s

=== Churches ===
St Mary's Episcopal Church, also known as the Priory Church, is the town's oldest building, built for the Carmelite Order of friars in the 1450s. It is the only medieval Carmelite church still in use in the British Isles, and is a Category A listed building. After the Scottish Reformation of 1560 it served as the parish church until 1635. In 1890 it was reconsecrated for the Scottish Episcopal Church.

The Old Parish Church on The Vennel dates from 1633 and has an interesting early graveyard. The church became known as the South Church in 1929, and served the Church of Scotland congregation until 1956, when it united with St Andrew's Church. The old South Church building was sold in 1970 and is now a house.

The building which now houses Queensferry Parish Church, located in The Loan, was originally built as South Queensferry United Free Church. Following the union of the Church of Scotland and the United Free Church of Scotland in 1929, the UF Church became known as St Andrew's Church and the old Church of Scotland congregation as the South Church. The two congregations were united in 1956, becoming Queensferry Parish Church. The Reverend John Carrie was minister from 1971 until his untimely death in 2008. In 1972 he started an annual sponsored walk across the Forth Road Bridge for Christian Aid, so far raising over £1,000,000. In 2009 the Rev. David Cameron transferred from Newton Mearns to Queensferry Parish Church.

St Margaret's Roman Catholic church is also located on The Loan. Mass is celebrated daily.

=== Stately homes ===
- Hopetoun House – Two miles to the west, a splendid Georgian stately home designed by the Scottish architects Sir William Bruce and William Adam and situated in 150 acres (607,000 m^{2}) of parkland. Home to the Earls of Hopetoun since 1699.
- Dalmeny House – Two miles to the east, Dalmeny House was built by English architect William Wilkins in 1817 and is the home of the Earls of Rosebery. It houses the Rosebery and some of the Rothschild collections.
- Dundas Estate – One mile to the south. A 9-hole golf course has been established in its parkland since the 1920s. Each year it hosts a "The Life of Jesus Christ", an Oberammergau-type open-air passion play.

=== Other significant buildings ===
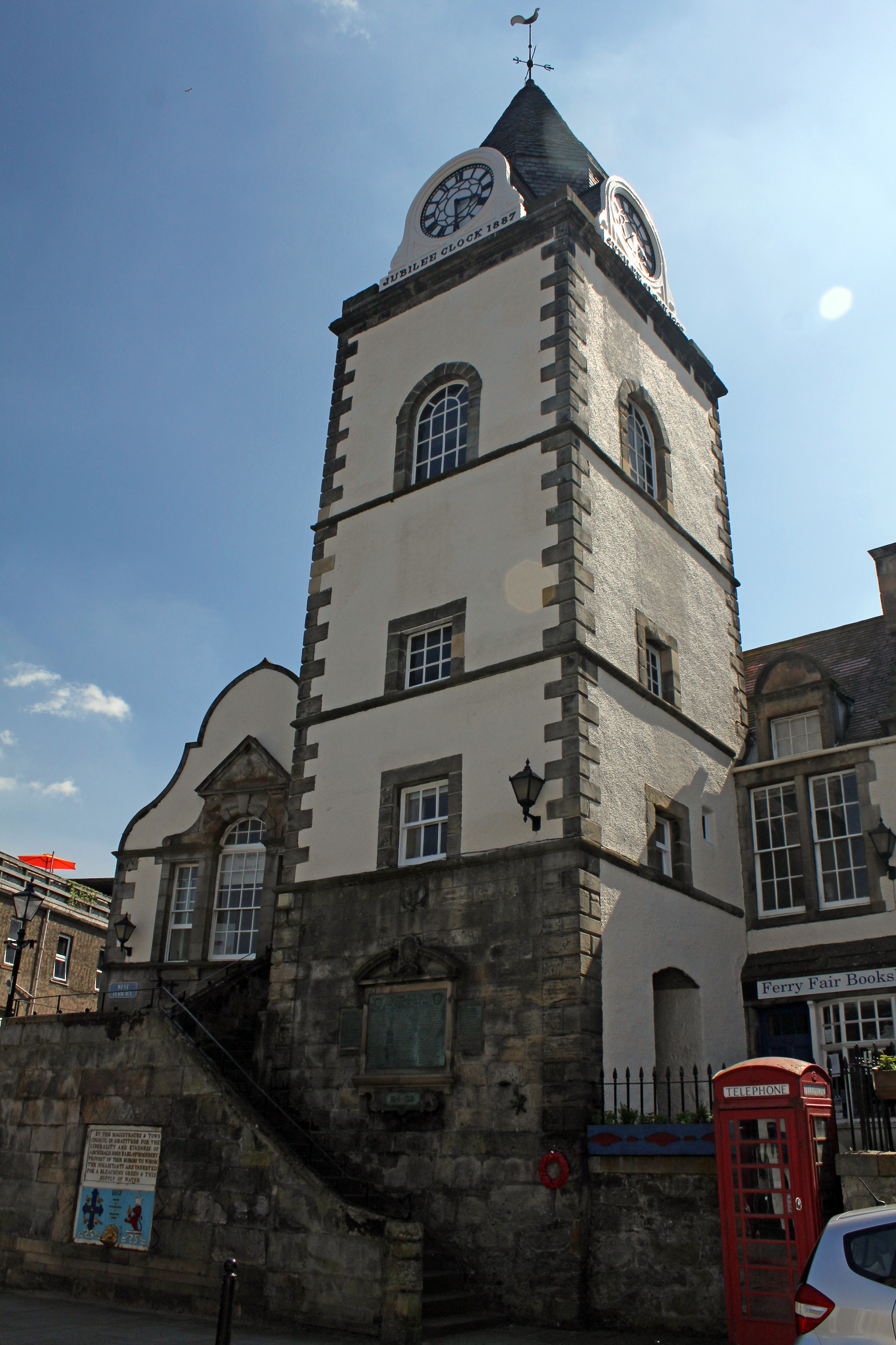
South Queensferry Tolbooth

Black Castle is a house on the High Street built in 1626. When the original owner, a sea-captain, was lost at sea, his maid was accused of paying a beggar-woman to cast a spell. Both women were burned for witchcraft. Plewlands House is a 17th-century mansion in the centre of the village. It was restored in the 1950s as flats, and is now managed by the National Trust for Scotland. South Queensferry Tolbooth, on the High Street, dates from the 17th century, with a clock-tower built in 1720.

The Hawes Inn, dating from the 17th century, lies east of Queensferry, almost under the Forth Bridge on its south side. It features in Robert Louis Stevenson's 1886 novel Kidnapped. Opposite the Hawes Inn is the pier which served the ferry (from which the town derives its name) until the opening of the Forth Road Bridge. The pier is now used by tourist boats including the ferry to Inchcolm.

Modern day Orocco Pier, latterly named the Queensferry Arms Hotel, has been a local inn and place of refreshment since 1664. Located opposite the Jubilee Clock Tower, at 17 High Street, its original facade still boasts many of its original features.

South Queensferry Cemetery on Ferrymuir Lane at the south end of the town is unremarkable other than for the very large number of Royal Navy war graves, many for casualties of the Battle of Jutland (1916) who were brought here for burial. It is maintained and operated by the City of Edinburgh Council. It superseded the small graveyard on The Vennel in the centre of town.

Opened in March 2007 by Dakota Hotels, the "black box" seen from the A90 is a hotel, bar and grill.

=== Mesolithic settlement ===
In 2012, as part of the excavations for the new Queensferry Crossing, archaeologists excavated the remains of a Mesolithic dwelling dating to around 10,000 years ago and believed to be the earliest home discovered in Scotland, and possibly the entire UK.

Archaeological evidence suggests this early shoreline activity formed part of a longer pattern of human use of the area, indicating that people lived and returned to the site well before its later development as a recognised crossing point on the Firth of Forth.

=== Schools ===
Queensferry has four primary schools (Echline Primary, Queensferry Primary, St Margaret's RC Primary and Dalmeny Primary) and one secondary school (Queensferry High School), with Kirkliston Primary also part of its catchment area.

=== Landmarks ===
The local brewery, Ferry Brewery, makes beers named after landmarks around the town, including the Ferry Crossing and the Three Bridges.

== Transport ==
Queensferry is served by bus services operated by: Lothian Country and Stagecoach East Scotland.

Lothian Country operate routes:

- 43 – Queensferry – Dalmeny – Blackhall – Craigleith – Edinburgh
- 71 – Queensferry – Kirkliston – Newbridge – Ratho Station – Gyle Centre
- N43 – Edinburgh – Queensferry – Kirkliston – Winchburgh – Broxburn – Dechmont (Night Service)

Dalmeny railway station is located to the east of South Queensferry, where ScotRail operates services on its Fife Circle route towards Cowdenbeath railway station and Glenrothes with Thornton railway station.

== Gallery ==
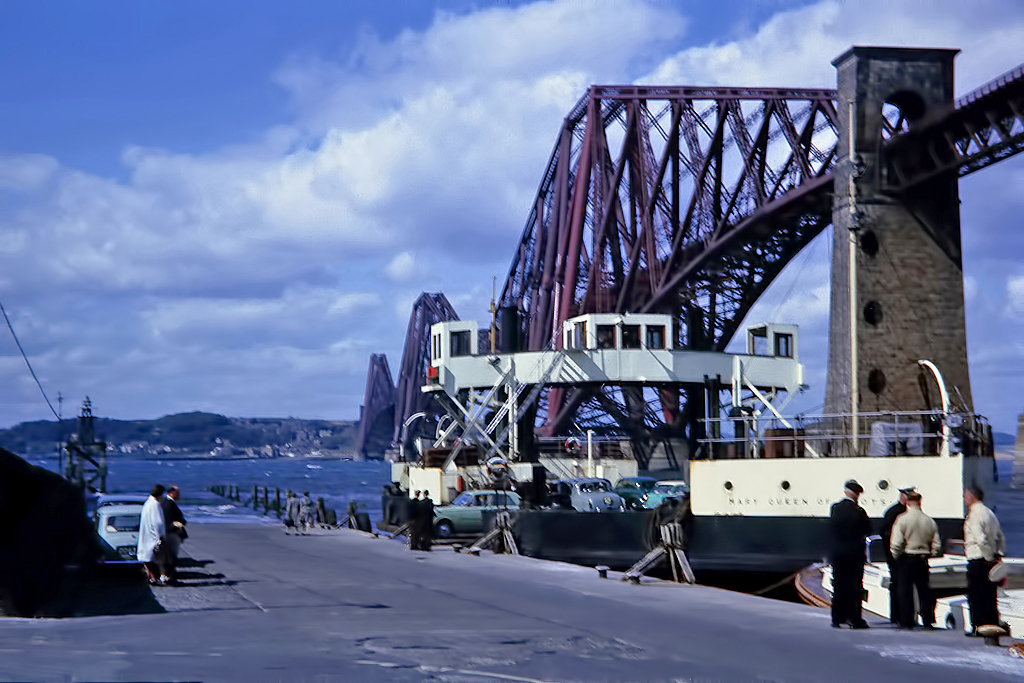
The ferry boat in 1964, the year it was taken out of commission

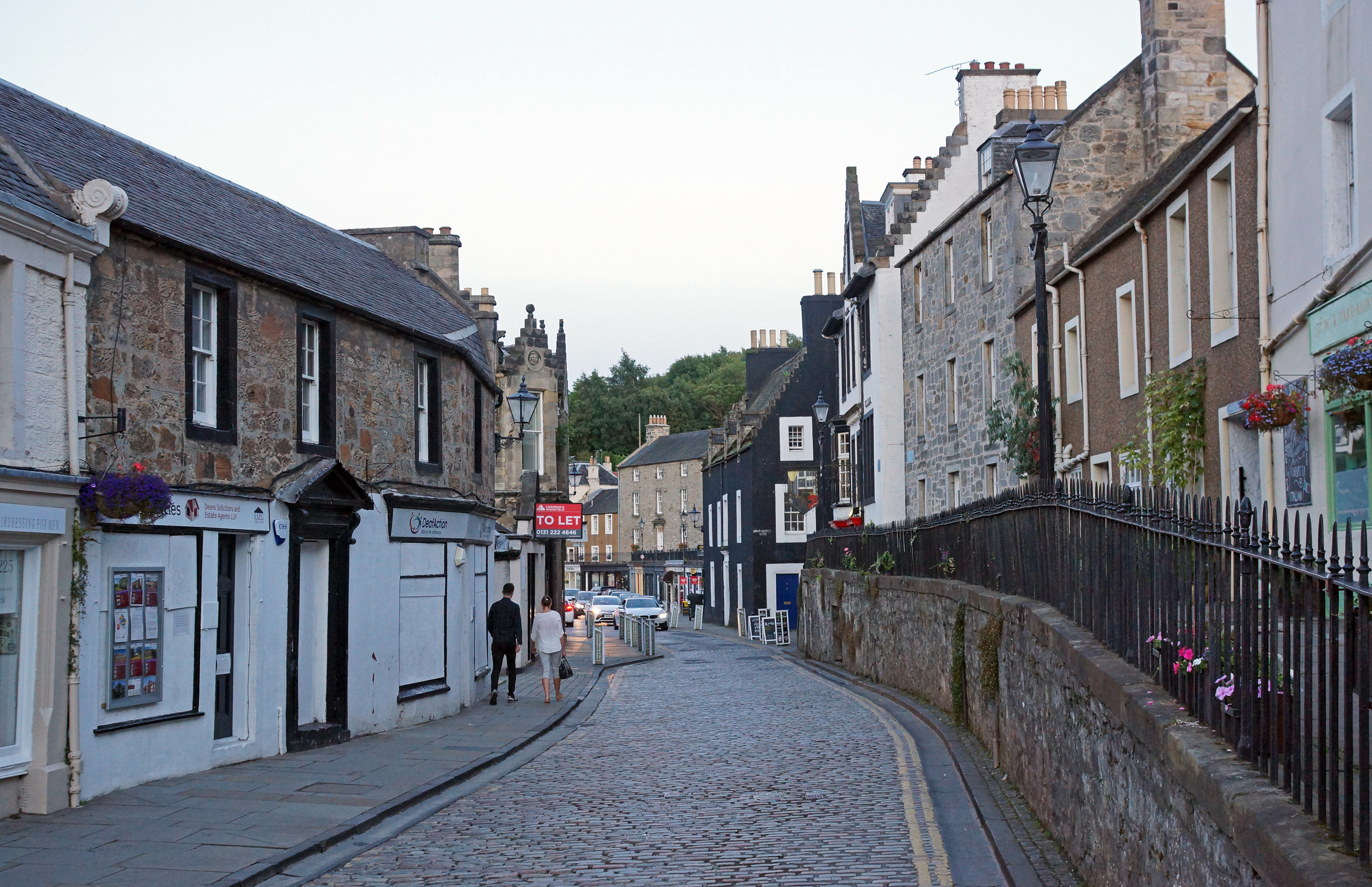
The High Street

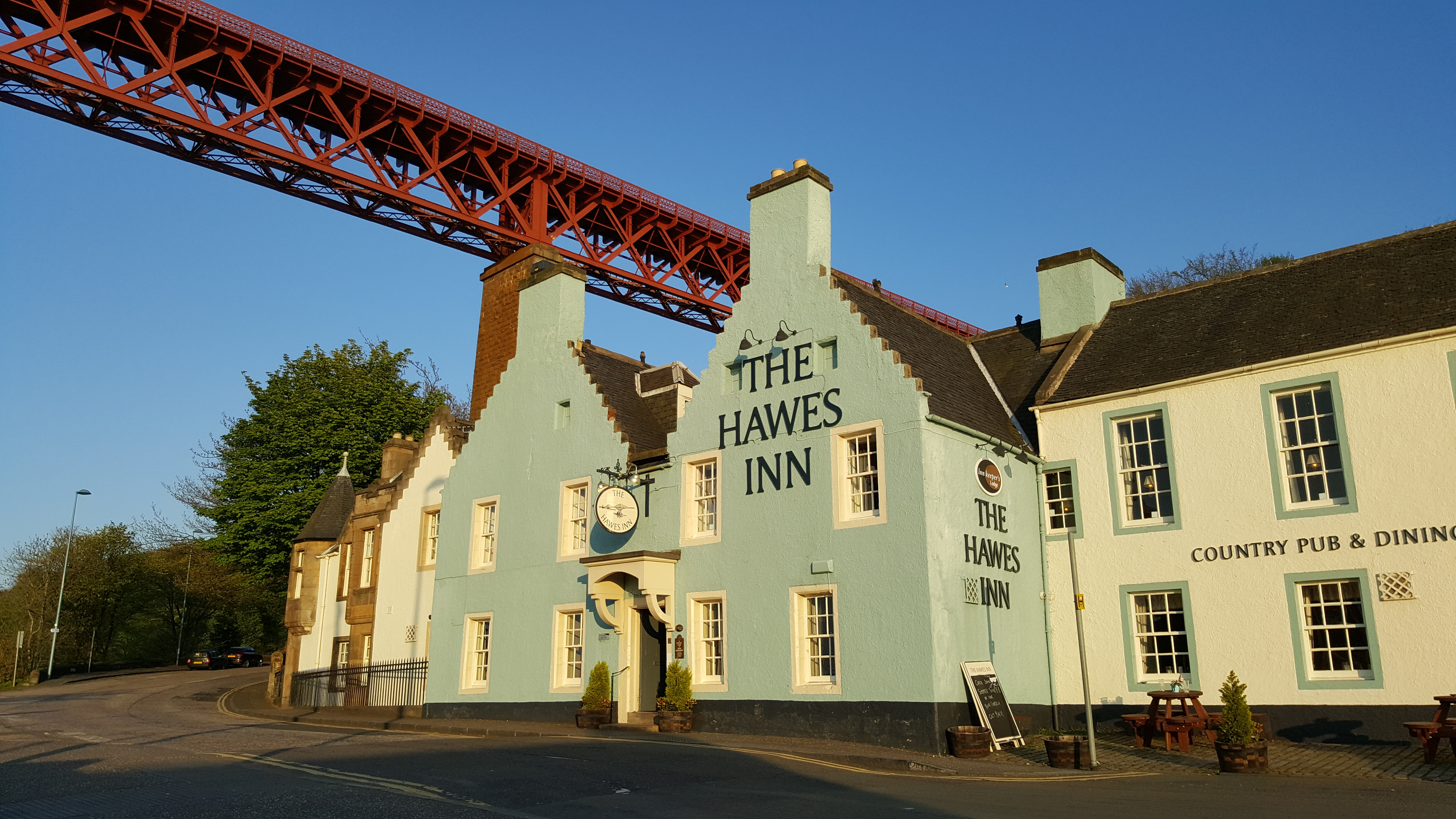
The Hawes Inn

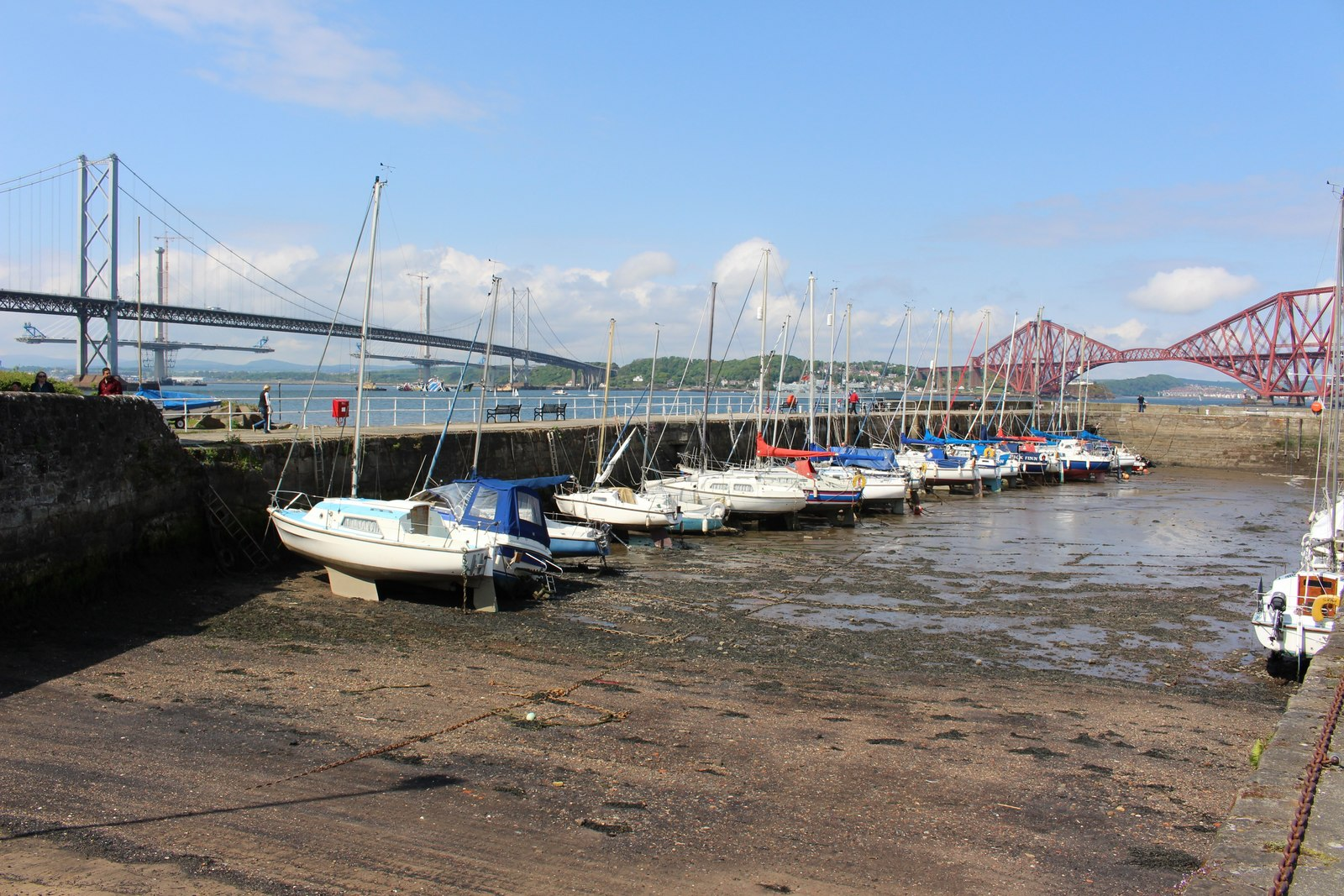
The harbour

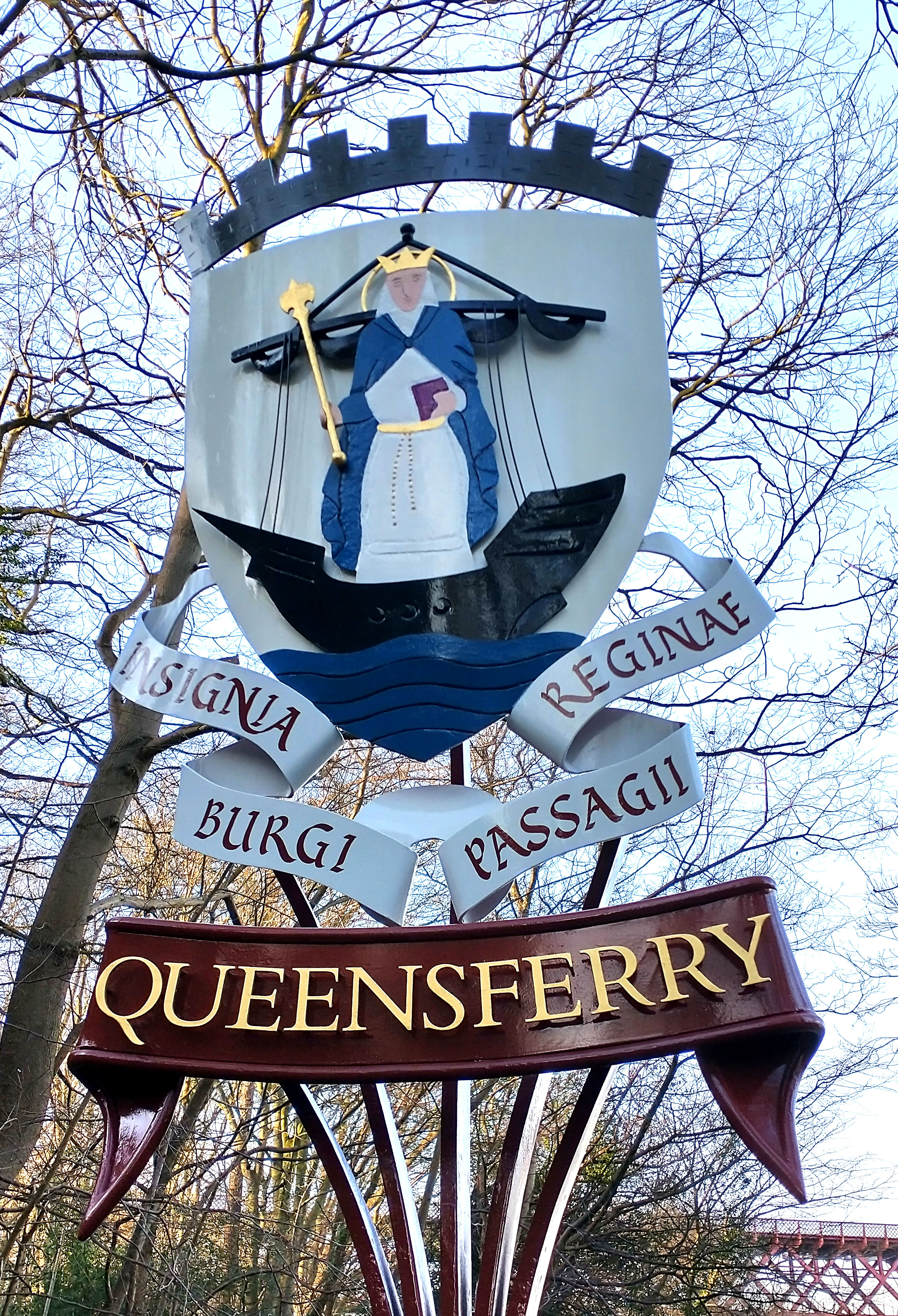
The coat of arms of the burgh

== Notable residents ==
- Paul Appleby, professional featherweight boxer
- David Boner, former footballer
- Ben Chatwin, musician
- Julia Cross, former ITF Taekwon-Do World Champion
- Stephen Hendry, professional snooker player
- Jim Kerr and Chrissie Hynde, musicians
- Ken MacLeod, science fiction writer
- Anna Meredith, composer
- Callum Paterson, professional footballer
- Robert Stodart Wyld (1808-1893), distiller and philosopher, Provost of Queensferry from 1852 to 1861
