= Passion Trust =

British charity

The Passion Trust is a charity that supports the resurgence of Christian Passion Plays in the United Kingdom.

Its aim is to keep alive the heritage of dramatic re-enactments of the Easter story. Passion Plays take place in over 50 different locations in the UK, each adapted to the local community and the volunteers who perform and produce the plays. As reported in Christianity Today, the purpose of Passion Plays is to bring the Gospel message to life within communities.

== History ==
The Passion Trust was established in 2011. It acts as a centre for resourcing, financing and equipping community performances to support the dramatic, story-telling heritage of religious drama for future generations. It also advocates for public drama through local and national media.

Trustees and supporters of the Passion Trust have been involved in Passion Plays all over the world, including Australia, South Africa, Italy and Brazil, where Jesus was crucified on prison bars. Passion Plays have also been performed by prisoners in jails including at Louisiana State Penitentiary (2012) where seventy-five inmates at Angola Prison and Louisiana Correctional Institution for Women (LCIW) came together to put on a performance of the Passion. The performance was the subject of a documentary that shows scenes from the daily lives of the inmates together with scenes from the play that is performed in the prison grounds. Other Passion Plays in prisons include those performed in HM Prison Greenock in Glasgow.

== Activity ==
The Passion Trust hosts an annual conference attended by actors, arts practitioners, producers, directors, fundraisers and journalists. It also shares information for people starting new Passion Plays or wanting to develop existing plays, including script-writing, fund-raising, working with local councils and engaging with local communities.

== Notable speakers and theatre members ==
Keynote speakers at Passion Trust conferences include:

- Israel Oyelumade. Oyelumade played Jesus in Winchester's Passion Play in 2006 and was head of Character Development for Love Beyond, a musical based on the Bible story with vocal performances from West End stars.
- James Burke-Dunsmore. Burke-Dunsmore is a writer, director and actor who has played Jesus for over 17 years. He regularly performs in Trafalgar Square, Guildford and Wintershall.
- Sir Jack Stewart-Clark. Sir Jack facilitates Passion Plays in Scotland and around the world, most notably in Louisiana State Penitentiary and in Rwanda. In 2016, he gained approval from the Vatican to take a Passion Play, dramatising the last days of Christ, to the Opera Jail in Milan, Italy. He has said: "[Prisoners] can become redeemed in prison, even if you’re never getting out". It was reported that Archbishop Leo Cushley was supportive of this project.
- Suzanne Lofthus. Suzanne Lofthus. Lofthus has directed Passion Plays in local communities and in prisons, as well as the Edinburgh Passion Play. She has also directed the annual open air promenade Easter Play in Princes Street Gardens, Edinburgh.
- Peter Hutley. Hutley is the producer of the Nativity Play, Passion Play and Life of Christ plays that were performed on the Wintershall Estate by the Wintershall Players. Hutley has been awarded an OBE for his charitable work and is also a Knight of St. Gregory.
- Professor Helen Bond. Professor Bond is a British Professor of Christian Origins and New Testament.
- Professor Jolyon Mitchell. Professor Mitchell specialises in Religion, Violence and Peacebuilding, with particular reference to the arts. Mitchell worked as a Producer and Journalist at BBC World Service before moving to the University of Edinburgh.
- Sharon Muiruri. Muiruri was artistic director of the Poole Passion and wrote the Passion Play entitled 'Through the Eyes of a Child'.
- Alexander Stewart-Clark. The founding trustee of the Passion Trust, he has been involved in Passion Plays for over 20 years, acting in them, fundraising and supporting them. He is responsible for inspiring a large number of professional directors, actors and producers to start up new Passion Plays around the UK. He is also involved in a number of charities helping ex-offenders, orphans, and community art schemes.
- Charlotte de Klee. De Kle is Producer of the Wintershall plays, including the Passion of Christ held every Easter in Trafalgar Square.
- Neil Maddock. Maddock played Jesus in a Passion Play in Southampton in 2011.

== International Links ==
The Passion Trust connects UK Passion Plays with Europassion, a large European organisation that promotes Passion Plays in Europe. Established in 1982, this umbrella organisation draws together Passion Play communities from several European countries, some of which have been performing their plays for hundreds of years. Over 80 Passion groups from 16 countries are represented.

According to Mons. Fausto Panfili, the Chaplain of the Europassion:

The experience of the Europassion constantly lets us experience a so far unexplored pathway, so that we can continue to grow. Surmounting a self-referred vision of our own experience obligates us to confront a regional, national, European and universal horizon. That is why a new vision, not fragmentary, is necessary. Unity doesn’t mean uniformity. A spiritual energy, stronger and more attentive to cultural elaboration, a more evident solidarity in order to be recognised as bearers of hope, to help the people and communities grow.
