= List of members of the European Parliament for the Scottish National Party =

This is a list of Scottish National Party MEPs who were elected as members elected to the European Parliament representing the Scottish National Party.

== List of MEPs ==
Name	Constituency	Period
Winnie Ewing	Highlands and Islands	1979–1999
Allan Macartney	North East Scotland	1994–1998
Ian Hudghton	North East Scotland	1998–1999
Ian Hudghton	Scotland	1999–2019
Neil MacCormick	Scotland	1999–2004
Alyn Smith	Scotland	2004–2019
Christian Allard	Scotland	2019–2020
Heather Anderson	Scotland	2019–2020
Aileen McLeod	Scotland	2019–2020

== See also ==
- Scottish National Party
