= List of European Parliament by-elections in the United Kingdom =

By-elections to the European Parliament in the United Kingdom were held during the period when the United Kingdom used single-member, first-past-the-post constituencies to elect Members of the European Parliament from 1979 to 1999: they were required when a member resigned, died or was disqualified. Six by-elections were held in this period, all retained by the holding party.

The European Parliamentary Elections Act 1999 established a new system of multi-member constituencies elected by a closed party list system based on the regions of England, plus Scotland and Wales. The single transferable vote system was retained in Northern Ireland. Because of the new system, retiring MEPs would be replaced by a different person from the list, so no further by-elections were held.

== Summary ==
By-election	Date	Incumbent	Party	Winner	Party	Cause	Retained at next election
London South West	20 September 1979	Shelagh Roberts	Conservative	Shelagh Roberts	Conservative	Disqualification	Yes
Midlands West	5 March 1987	Terry Pitt	Labour	John Bird	Labour	Death	Yes
Hampshire Central	15 December 1988	Basil de Ferranti	Conservative	Edward Kellett-Bowman	Conservative	Death	Yes
Merseyside West	12 December 1996	Kenneth Stewart	Labour	Richard Corbett	Labour	Death	N/A (MEP re-elected at next election under a party-list system)
Yorkshire South	7 May 1998	Norman West	Labour	Linda McAvan	Labour	Resignation	N/A (MEP re-elected at next election under a party-list system)
North East Scotland	26 November 1998	Allan Macartney	SNP	Ian Hudghton	SNP	Death	N/A (MEP re-elected at next election under a party-list system)

== By-elections ==
=== London South West ===
The London South West by-election took place on 20 September 1979, a few months after the 1979 election. The elected MEP, Shelagh Roberts, was disqualified for holding an office of profit under the Crown. Roberts ran again and won, but with a significant swing against her.

1979 London South West by-election
Party	Candidate	Votes	%	±%
Conservative	Shelagh Roberts	41,096	41.2	−10.8
Labour	Tony Hart	32,632	32.7	+0.5
Liberal	Christopher Mayhew	23,842	23.9	+10.7
ACMFT	W. O. Smedley	1,830	1.9	
Independent	D. Hussey	305	0.3	
Majority		8,464	8.5	−11.3
Turnout		99,705	19.4	−11.8
Conservative hold		Swing	−5.7	

=== Midlands West ===
The Midlands West by-election took place on 5 March 1987. It was caused by the death of Terry Pitt, the sitting MEP. The seat was retained by Labour, with a much reduced majority.

1987 Midlands West by-election
Party	Candidate	Votes	%	±%
Labour	John Bird	59,761	39.2	−11.5
Conservative	Michael Whitby	55,736	36.5	−0.7
Liberal	Christopher Carter	37,106	24.3	+12.2
Majority		4,025	2.6	−10.8
Turnout		152,603	28.2	+1.2
Labour hold		Swing	-5.4	

=== Hampshire Central ===
The Hampshire Central by-election took place on 15 December 1988. It was caused by the death of Basil de Ferranti, the sitting MEP. The seat was held by the Conservatives with a large majority.

1988 Hampshire Central by-election
Party	Candidate	Votes	%	±%
Conservative	Edward Kellet-Bowman	38,039	49.0	−2.8
Labour	John Arnold	16,597	21.4	−2.6
SLD	David Chidgey	13,392	17.3	−6.9
SDP	Martin Attlee	5,952	7.7	
Green	Sally Penton	3,603	4.6	
Majority		21,442	27.6	−0.2
Turnout		77,583	14.1	−15.4
Conservative hold		Swing	-0.1	

=== Merseyside West ===
The Merseyside West by-election took place on 12 December 1996. It was caused by the death of Kenneth Stewart, the sitting MEP. The seat was held by Labour with a reduced large majority.

1996 Merseyside West by-election
Party	Candidate	Votes	%	±%
Labour	Richard Corbett	31,484	53.8	−4.6
Conservative	Jeremy Myers	12,780	21.8	+1.8
Liberal Democrats	Kiron Reid	8,829	15.1	+1.0
Liberal	Steve Radford	4,050	6.9	
National Democrats	Simon Darby	718	1.2	
Natural Law	John Collins	680	1.2	
Majority		18,704	32.0	−2.8
Turnout		58,541	11.3	
Labour hold		Swing	-3.2	

=== Yorkshire South ===
The Yorkshire South by-election took place on 7 May 1998. It was caused by the retirement of Norman West, the incumbent MEP for 14 years. The seat was held by Labour, but saw a large reduction in the majority.

1998 Yorkshire South by-election
Party	Candidate	Votes	%	±%
Labour	Linda McAvan	62,275	52.2	−20.5
Liberal Democrats	Diana Paulette-Wallis	22,051	18.5	+10.6
Conservative	Robert Goodwill	21,085	17.7	+3.9
UKIP	Peter Davies	13,830	11.6	+9.0
Majority		40,224	33.7	−31.1
Turnout		119,241	23.4	
Labour hold		Swing	15.6	

=== North East Scotland ===
The North East Scotland by-election took place on 26 November 1998. It was caused by the death of Allan Macartney, the sitting MEP. The seat was held by the SNP, with an increased majority.

1998 North East Scotland by-election
Party	Candidate	Votes	%	±%
SNP	Ian Hudghton	57,445	47.6	+4.9
Conservative	Struan Stevenson	23,744	19.7	+1.1
Labour	Kathleen Walkershaw	23,086	19.1	−9.3
Liberal Democrats	Keith Raffan	11,753	9.7	+1.5
Scottish Socialist	Harvey Duke	2,510	2.1	
Green	Robin Harper	2,067	1.7	+0.5
Majority		33,701	27.9	+3.8
Turnout		120,605	20.5	
SNP hold		Swing	+1.9	
