= Queen Mary's Grammar School =

Location
- Sutton Road; Walsall, West Midlands, WS1 2PG; England; 52.5775°N 1.9665°W

Information
- Type: Grammar school with academy status
- Motto: Quas dederis solas semper habebis opes (What thou hast given alone shall be eternal riches unto thee (Epigrams of Martial, XLII))
- Established: 1554; 472 years ago
- Local authority: Walsall Borough Council
- Department for Education URN: 136773 Tables
- Ofsted: Reports
- Headmaster: Richard J. Langton
- Gender: Boys (mixed sixth form)
- Age: 11 to 18
- Houses: Aragon; Darby; Gryphon; Petypher
- Colours: Red; Blue; Yellow; Green
- Publication: The QM Observer
- Website: www.qmgs.walsall.sch.uk

Queen Mary's Grammar School (QMGS) is a boys' grammar school with academy status located in the Six Ways area on Sutton Road, Walsall, England, less than a mile from the town centre and one of the oldest schools in the country. The sixth form is coeducational.

== Admissions ==
Admittance to the school is by entrance exam taken at the age of 10/11. Since September 2020, 180 pupils enter the school in September each year, increased gradually from 96 in September 2012. The school has grown from 718 in 2011 to 1,305 in 2022.

There is separate admission into the Sixth Form based on academic performance at GCSE, requiring a minimum score of 54 points in GCSEs and least a 7 in the applicant's chosen subjects. As of 2019, there are over 400 students on roll in the Sixth Form. At this stage of the school, girls are also admitted.

== History ==
=== Foundation ===
The school was founded in 1554 by George and Nicolas Hawe, two leading townsmen, with Queen Mary I as its royal patron and benefactor. At the time it had about sixty pupils, all boys, and taught Classics almost exclusively.

=== New sites ===
The school has grown significantly since its foundation and moved three times. Originally housed in an old town guild-hall near St Matthew’s Church, it moved to Park Street in 1811, into new buildings in Lichfield Street in 1850 (a site now used by Queen Mary's High School) and finally to a purpose-built school on the Mayfield site in 1965.

=== Renovations ===
In 2026, under the current headmaster, Richard Langton, the school received funding for the 'Future Sport' project, in which a complete renovation of the school field is being done, including an AstroTurf pitch being built. As of 2026, it is still in the process.

== Academic performance ==
Queen Mary's performs very well in exams across the board, with consistent success in the sixth form. In 2007, the school became a specialist Language College. The extra funds from this have, among other things, facilitated the building of a new wing of the school buildings. The school built a new sports hall to support the gym and swimming facilities. The Science Block was also updated, with new Biology labs being built. A new sixth form block has been constructed and it opened late September 2012. Later in 2020, after Covid-19, the Welfare Hub, consisted of a medical room, and support facility for students with special educational needs (SEN), is built. As of 2025, the school's most recent Ofsted inspection resulted in a judgement of Outstanding.

== Activities ==
Extracurricular activities at Queen Mary’s Grammar School include drama, sport, music, and a Combined Cadet Force contingent comprising both Army and RAF sections.

The school has a plaque in Saint George's Memorial Church, Ypres, to honour the ex-pupils who died in the Ypres Salient and on the Somme during World War One. The plaque was paid for by the QM Club and was unveiled during a Year 9 Battlefields trip.

Every year, Year 7 students and senior prefects travel to Westminster Abbey to commemorate the school’s founder on the Friday closest to 6 July. All of Year 7, along with prefects and staff, lay a wreath on the tomb of Queen Mary. The tradition is that the wreath is jointly laid by the youngest member of Year 7 and the senior prefect.

== Project Horizon ==
Project Horizon is the school's near space programme, started in 2012, which runs annual missions. A small payload carrying cameras and tracking hardware is lifted by a high-altitude balloon filled with helium gas into the stratosphere until the balloon bursts and the payload descends. Film footage and still images of the payload's journey are recorded during the flight, capturing views of Earth from the stratosphere.

== Notable former pupils ==
- David J. Brown (cricketer) former England cricketer
- Colin Charvis, Welsh and British Lions rugby union player
- Vernon Coleman, Conspiracy theorist, author and AIDS denialist
- David Ennals, Baron Ennals, Labour MP from 1974-83 for Norwich North, and from 1964-70 for Dover
- Prof. Martin Ennals, Ariel F. Sallows Professor of Human Rights in 1991 at the University of Saskatchewan, Secretary-General from 1968-80 of Amnesty International
- Michael Fitzgerald, Roman Catholic Cardinal archbishop and expert on Christian–Muslim relations
- Martin Fowler, software developer and author
- Prof Sir Harry Hinsley, historian and cryptanalyst
- Jeffrey Holland, actor
- David Howarth, academic and Liberal Democrat MP from 2005-10 for Cambridge
- Rupert Moon, Rugby Union international for Wales
- Sir Henry Newbolt, poet, novelist and historian
- Sir Harmar Nicholls, 1st Baronet, Conservative MP from 1950-74 for Peterborough
- Andrew Peach, radio presenter
- Terry Pitt, political researcher and adviser, Labour MEP from 1984-6 for Midlands West
- Sir Edwin Thomas Smith, Australian brewer, businessman, councillor, mayor, politician and philanthropist
- John Somers, 1st Baron Somers, Lord Chancellor of England, 1697–1700, member of the committee which drafted the Bill of Rights
- Bryan Stanley, trade union leader
- Maurice Wiggin (1912–1986), journalist and memoirist
- Frank Windsor, actor
