= Baroness Young =

Baroness Young may refer to:

- Janet Young, Baroness Young (1926–2002), first woman Leader of the House of Lords and cabinet minister under Margaret Thatcher
- Lola Young, Baroness Young of Hornsey (born 1951), actress, cultural studies professor, and crossbench peer in the Lords
- Barbara Young, Baroness Young of Old Scone (born 1948), former Labour Whip in the Lords and head of numerous charities and agencies

== See also ==
- Lord Young (disambiguation)
