= Stanley Johnson (writer) =

British politician and writer (born 1940)

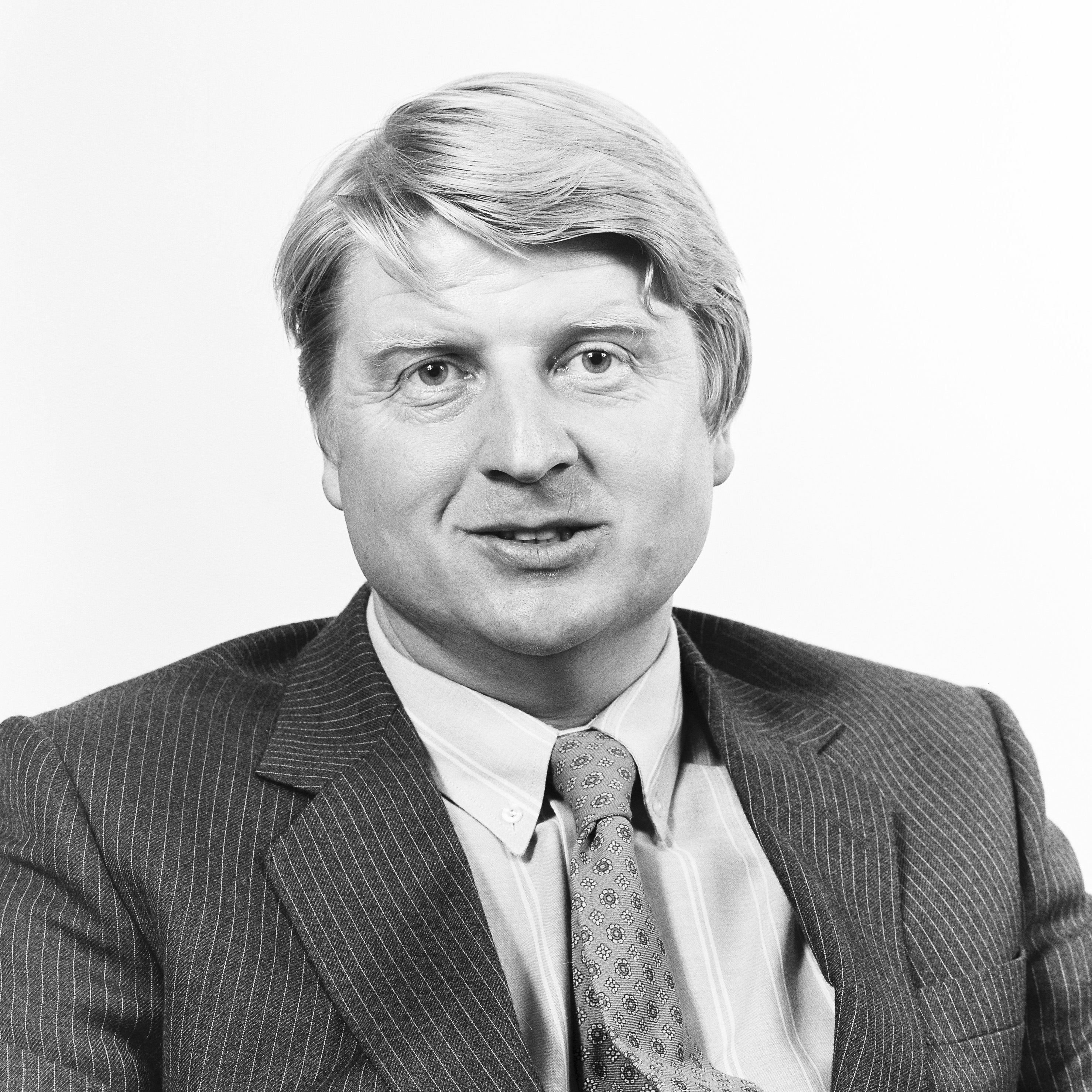
- Official MEP portrait, 1984

Member of the European Parliament for Wight and Hampshire East
- In office 7 June 1979 – 14 June 1984
- Preceded by: Constituency established
- Succeeded by: Richard Simmonds

Personal details
- Born: Stanley Patrick Johnson; 18 August 1940 (age 86) Penzance, Cornwall, England
- Citizenship: United Kingdom; France
- Party: Conservative
- Spouses: Charlotte Fawcett (m. 1963; div. 1979); Jennifer Kidd (m. 1981)
- Children: 6, including: Boris; Rachel; Jo; Julia
- Relatives: Ali Kemal (grandfather); Zeki Kuneralp (uncle); Selim Kuneralp (cousin); Carrie Symonds (daughter-in-law); Amelia Gentleman (daughter-in-law)
- Education: Exeter College, Oxford (BA); Columbia University
- Stanley Johnson's voice Desert Island Discs, 18 May 2008 from the BBC programme Profile, 4 August 2012

Stanley Patrick Johnson (born 18 August 1940) is a British author and former politician who was a member of the European Parliament (MEP) for Wight and Hampshire East from 1979 to 1984. A former employee of the World Bank and the European Commission, he has written books on environmental and population issues. His six children include Boris Johnson, who was Prime Minister of the United Kingdom from 2019 to 2022. He is a member of the Conservative Party.

== Early life and education ==
Stanley Johnson was born in 1940 in Penzance, Cornwall, the son of Osman Kemal (1909–1992) (later known as Wilfred Johnson) and Irene Williams (1907–1987; daughter of Stanley Fred Williams of Bromley, Kent – who was the grandson of Sir George Williams – and Marie Louise de Pfeffel). His paternal grandfather, Ali Kemal Bey, one of the last interior ministers of the Ottoman government, was assassinated in 1922 during the Turkish War of Independence. Stanley's father was born in 1909 in Bournemouth, and his birth was registered as Osman Ali Wilfred Kemal. Osman's Anglo-Swiss mother Winifred Brun died shortly after giving birth. Ali Kemal returned to the Ottoman Empire in 1912, whereafter Osman Wilfred and his sister Selma were brought up by their English grandmother, Margaret Brun, and took her maiden name, Johnson, Stanley's father thus becoming Wilfred Johnson.

Johnson's maternal grandmother's parents were Hubert Freiherr von Pfeffel (born in Munich in the Kingdom of Bavaria on 8 December 1843) and his wife Hélène Arnous-Rivière (born on 14 January 1862). Hubert von Pfeffel was the son of Karl Freiherr von Pfeffel (born in Dresden in the Kingdom of Saxony on 22 November 1811; died in Munich on 25 January 1890) by his marriage in Augsburg on 16 February 1836 to Karolina von Rothenburg (born in the Free City of Frankfurt on 28 November 1805; died in Frankfurt on 13 February 1872), herself said to be the illegitimate daughter of Prince Paul of Württemberg by Friederike Porth.

Stanley Johnson attended Ravenswood preparatory School near Tiverton in Devon before going to Sherborne School, Dorset. While still an undergraduate studying English at Exeter College, Oxford, he took part in the Marco Polo Expedition with Tim Severin and Michael de Larrabeiti, travelling on a motorcycle and sidecar from Oxford to Venice and on to India and Afghanistan. The adventure led to the publication of Severin's 1964 book Tracking Marco Polo, with photographs by de Larrabeiti.

Johnson started studying at Columbia University in 1963, but dropped out after a year.

== Career ==
Johnson was the recipient of a United States, Harkness Fellowship and was then employed at the World Bank in Washington, D.C. during the 1960s. He went on to become the head of Prevention of Pollution Division at the European Commission (EC) in Brussels from 1973, acting briefly as advisor to the head of ECPS in May 1979, before taking a leave of absence a month later. He resumed his former role with the EC in 1984, until taking a second leave of absence in 1990, this time to work in the field of international environmental policy. He retired early from the EC in 1994.

=== Politics ===
Johnson in 1997

From June 1979–1984 Johnson served as the Conservative MEP (95,000 majority) representing the area of Hants East and the Isle of Wight.

At the 2005 general election Johnson stood for the Conservative Party in the constituency of Teignbridge, where he came second behind Richard Younger-Ross of the Liberal Democrats.

In May 2008 Johnson hoped to be selected to contest his son Boris's parliamentary seat of Henley for the Conservative Party, but a local councillor named John Howell was the candidate selected.

Having supported the Remain campaign during the 2016 European Union membership referendum, in October 2017 he came out in support of the United Kingdom leaving the European Union, stating that "the time has come to bail out" and cited the approach and attitude of the European Commission president Jean-Claude Juncker as a major factor in his change of mind.

=== Books and other writing ===
He has published a number of books dealing with environmental issues and nine novels, including The Commissioner, which was made into a 1998 film starring John Hurt. In 1962 he won the Newdigate Prize for Poetry.

For a time, starting on 26 May 2005, he wrote a weekly column for the G2 section of The Guardian, and continued to write for various newspapers and magazines, often on environmental topics. He is a patron of The Gorilla Organization, a charity working to protect mountain gorillas in Uganda, Rwanada and the DRC.

He wrote a memoir, Stanley I Presume, published in March 2009.

His 2015 novel The Virus is a thriller about the rise of a mysterious virus and the fight to stop a deadly pandemic.

=== Television ===
Johnson was one of the first regular hosts of the late night discussion programme The Last Word on Channel 4's More4 channel, and made an appearance on Have I Got News For You on 7 May 2004.

In November 2017 Johnson was confirmed as a contestant for the seventeenth series of I'm a Celebrity...Get Me Out of Here!, finishing in seventh place. In 2018 he appeared on the BBC programme The Real Marigold Hotel with eight other celebrities. In February 2020 he appeared on BBC Two's Celebrity Antiques Road Trip.

=== Awards ===
In 1983 he received the RSPCA Richard Martin Award for Outstanding Services to animal welfare. The following year, 1984, he also received the Greenpeace Award for Outstanding Services to the Environment. He was for many years an ambassador for the UNEP Convention on the Conservation of Migratory Species of Wild Animals based in Bonn, Germany.

In October 2015 Johnson was awarded the RSPB Medal by the Royal Society for the Protection of Birds for his role in the creation of one of the cornerstones of Europe's nature conservation policy – the Habitats Directive (1992).

In December 2015 he received the World Wide Fund for Nature Leader for a Living Planet Award.

== Public statements ==
In August 2018 Johnson said his son Boris's comments that Muslim women who wear burkas look like "letterboxes" and "bank robbers" did not go far enough, and that criticism of the comments had been "synthetic indignation" created by political opponents.

In June 2022, ahead of Johnson's visit to China for a television programme on the explorer Marco Polo, Johnson called for the UK Parliament to lift a ban on the Chinese ambassador to the UK entering the parliamentary estate.

== Personal life ==
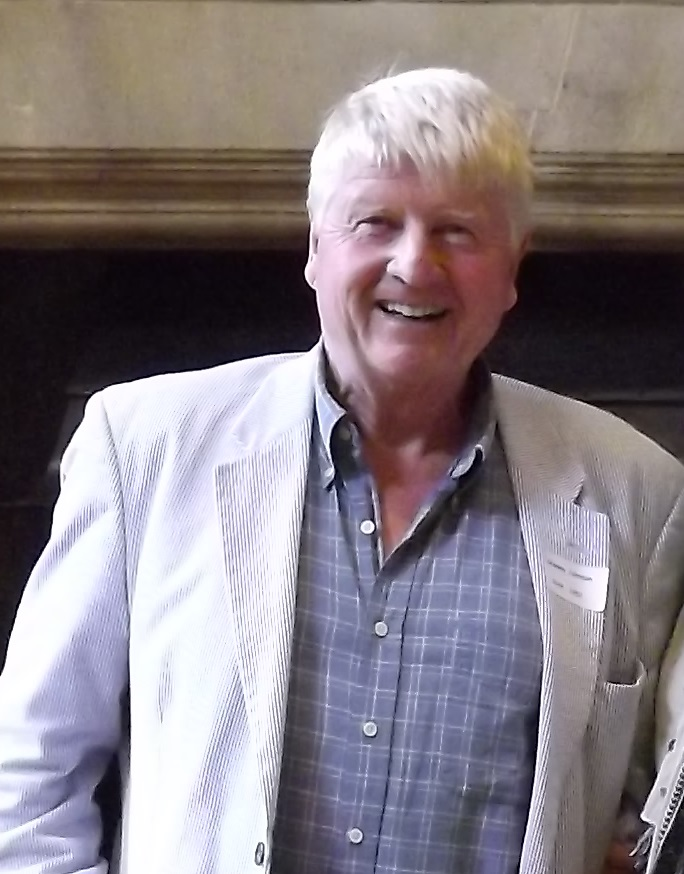
Johnson in 2011

While at Columbia University, Johnson married the painter Charlotte Fawcett in Marylebone, with whom he had four children: Boris, former Leader of the Conservative Party and Prime Minister of the United Kingdom; Rachel, journalist and former editor-in-chief of The Lady; Jo, former Conservative member of Parliament (MP) for Orpington, former Minister of State for Universities, and former Head of the Lex Column at the Financial Times; and Leo, filmmaker and entrepreneur. Johnson and Fawcett divorced in 1979. Johnson married Jennifer Kidd in Westminster in 1981, and they had two children: Julia and Maximilian.

In July 2020, during the COVID-19 pandemic, Johnson posted pictures on Instagram of himself travelling to Athens, Greece. He was criticised by the Liberal Democrat MP Jamie Stone for travelling at a time when guidance under lockdown was to avoid "all but essential international travel". At the time, Greece had reopened its borders but banned direct travel from the United Kingdom; Johnson had circumvented Greece's rules by travelling via Bulgaria.

In December 2020 Johnson said that he was applying for a French passport as his mother and her parents were French. After subsequently being awarded French citizenship Johnson stated that he was delighted.

=== Allegations of spousal abuse and inappropriate touching ===
Biographer Tom Bower reported in 2020 that Johnson’s first wife, Fawcett, alleged in an interview that she had experienced physical abuse during their marriage in the 1970s. Bower cited her account of one incident in which her nose was allegedly broken and her statement that she wished the matter to be public.

Johnson has denied any suggestion of domestic violence. In a written statement shown at the end of the 2024 Channel 4 documentary The Rise and Fall of Boris Johnson, his children from his marriage to Fawcett—Boris, Rachel, Leo, and Jo—said: "For the record, we as the four children don't in any way recognise this characterisation of our parents' marriage. He was a heroic father (still is) and what we did see first-hand was a huge and unwavering amount of affection between them."

On 15 November 2021 Caroline Nokes accused Johnson of inappropriately touching her at the Conservative Party Conference in Blackpool in 2003. Johnson said that he had "no recollection of Caroline Nokes at all". Following this, the journalist Ailbhe Rea accused Johnson of groping her at the 2019 Conservative Party Conference. Johnson also denied having any recollection of Ailbhe Rea.

== Works ==
- Gold Drain (1967, Heinemann) ISBN B0000CNKG6
- Panther Jones for President (1968, Heinemann) ISBN 0-434-37701-5
- Life without Birth: A Journey Through the Third World in Search of the Population Explosion (1970, Heinemann) ISBN 0-434-37702-3
- The Green Revolution (1972, Hamilton) ISBN 0-241-02102-2
- The Population Problem (1973, David & C) ISBN 0-7153-6282-8
- The Politics of Environment (1973, T Stacey) ISBN 0-85468-298-8
- The Urbane Guerilla (1975, Macmillan) ISBN 0-333-17679-0
- Pollution Control Policy of the EEC (1978, Graham & Trotman) ISBN 0-86010-136-3
- The Doomsday Deposit (1979, EP Dutton) ISBN 0-525-09468-7
- The Marburg Virus (1982, Heinemann) ISBN 0-434-37704-X
- Tunnel (1984, Heinemann) ISBN 0-434-37705-8
- Antarctica: The Last Great Wilderness (1985, Weidenfeld & N) ISBN 0-297-78676-8
- The Commissioner (1987, Century) ISBN 0-7126-1587-3
- World Population and the United Nations (1987, Cambridge UP) ISBN 0-521-32207-3
- Dragon River (1989, Frederick Muller) ISBN 0-09-173526-2
- The Earth Summit: The United Nations Conference on Environment and Development (UNCED) (1993, Kluwer Law International) ISBN 978-1-85333-784-0
- World Population - Turning the Tide (1994, Kluwer Law International) ISBN 1-85966-046-0
- The Environmental Policy of the European Communities (1995, Kluwer Law International) ISBN 90-411-0862-9
- The Politics of Population: Cairo, 1994 (1995, Earthscan) ISBN 1-85383-297-9
- Icecap (1999, Cameron May) ISBN 1-874698-67-8
- Stanley I Presume (2009, Fourth Estate Ltd) ISBN 0-00-729672-X
- Survival: Saving Endangered Migratory Species [co-authored with Robert Vagg] (2010, Stacey International) ISBN 1-906768-11-0
- Where the Wild Things Were: Travels of a Conservationist (2012, Stacey International) ISBN 1-906768-87-0
- UNEP The First 40 Years; A Narrative by Stanley Johnson (2012, United Nations Environment Programme) ISBN 978-92-807-3314-3
- Stanley I Resume (2014, Biteback) ISBN 978-1-84954-741-3
- The Virus (2015, Witness Impulse) ISBN 978-0062414922
- Kompromat (2017, Point Blank) ISBN 978-1-78607-246-7
- From An Antique Land (2021, Black Spring Press) ISBN 978-1-913606-46-6

European Parliament
New constituency	Member of the European Parliament for Wight and Hampshire East; 1979–1984	Succeeded by Richard Simmonds
