= John Bird (MEP) =

British politician

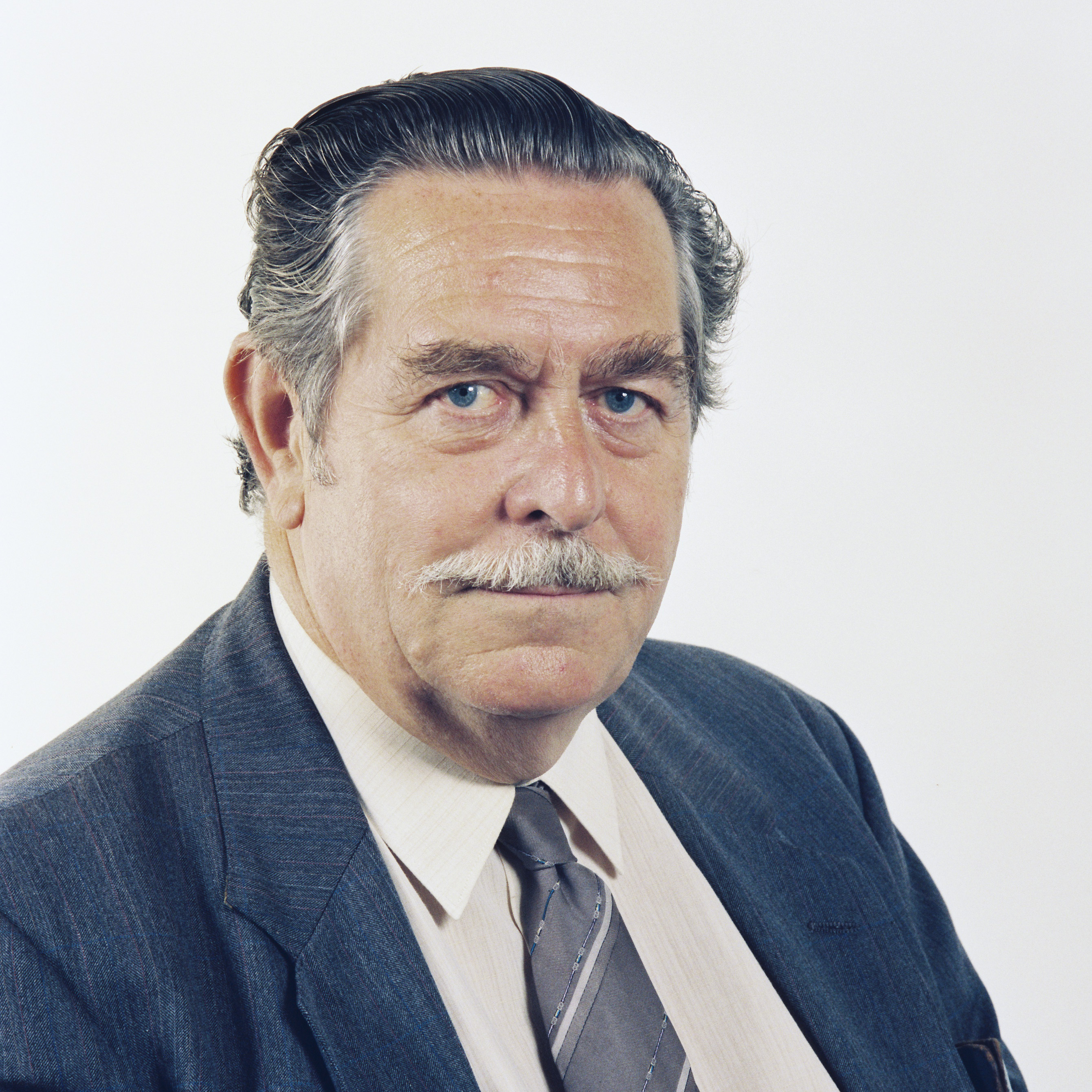

Member of the European Parliament for Midlands West
- In office 5 March 1987 – 9 June 1994
- Preceded by: Terry Pitt
- Succeeded by: Simon Murphy

Personal details
- Born: 6 February 1926 Wolverhampton, Staffordshire, United Kingdom
- Died: 18 November 1997 (aged 71)
- Party: Labour
- Occupation: engineer, soldier, lecturer

John A. W. Bird (6 February 1926 – 18 November 1997) was a British politician who served as Member of the European Parliament (MEP).

== Early life ==
Born in Wolverhampton, Bird trained as an engineer. He served in the infantry in the British Army during the Second World War, and later lectured in Wolverhampton Polytechnic.

== Politics ==
Bird was a longtime trade unionist. As leader of City of Wolverhampton Council, he spearheaded a 1986 financial rescue of Wolverhampton Wanderers F.C.

Bird was elected to the European Parliament in a 1987 by-election, representing Midlands West.
