= Barbara Young, Baroness Young of Old Scone =

BBC Governor, Peer and Chancellor of Cranfield University (born 1948)

The Right Honourable The Baroness Young of Old Scone FRSGS, HonMLS
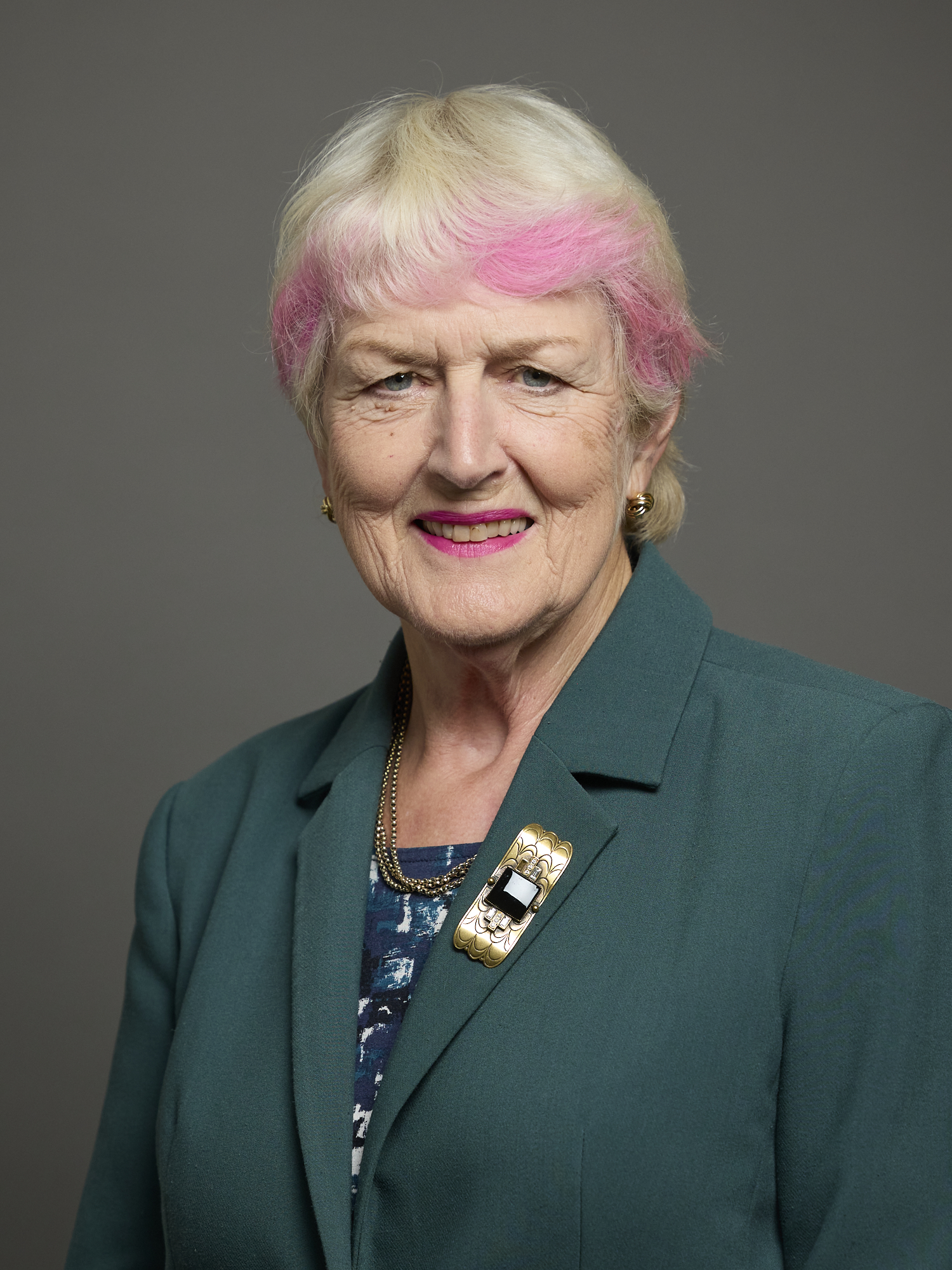
- Official portrait, 2025

3rd Chancellor of Cranfield University
- In office 2010–2020
- Preceded by: Richard Vincent, Baron Vincent of Coleshill
- Succeeded by: Deirdre Hutton

Member of the House of Lords
- Lord Temporal
- Life peerage 4 November 1997

Chair, Royal Veterinary College
- Incumbent
- Assumed office August 2019

Personal details
- Born: Barbara Scott Young; 8 April 1948 (age 78) Perth, Scotland
- Party: Labour (before 2000 and since 2015)
- Other political affiliations: Non-affiliated (2000–2015)

Barbara Scott Young, Baroness Young of Old Scone, FRSGS, HonMLS (born 8 April 1948) is a Scottish Labour member of the House of Lords. She was created a life peer on 4 November 1997 as Baroness Young of Old Scone, of Old Scone in Perth and Kinross.

Young was educated at Perth Academy, from where she went to the University of Edinburgh to read Classics and Business Studies.

As Vice-chair of the Council for the Institute of Health Management, Young carried out much of the work on the development of a “Policy Plan for the Institute – Priorities and Objectives”. She was appointed president in 1987, the first woman to hold the position.

In 1997 Young was appointed as Vice Chair of the BBC, standing down in November 2000 after two and a half years.

Young was chair of the Woodland Trust from 2016 to 2024. She was appointed Chair of the Forestry Commission, for a four-year term commencing on February 10, 2026.

She has been a member of the House of Lords Science and Technology Committee since January 2024.

She was the Chief Executive of health charity Diabetes UK, a position she took up on 1 November 2010 until September 2015. Her resignation was noted in an early day motion tabled 9 September 2015: "under Baroness Young's leadership, Diabetes UK has succeeded in putting diabetes treatment and care high on the healthcare agenda of the UK, including a key role in the National Diabetes Prevention Programme".

Before joining Diabetes UK, Young was involved in the establishment of the Care Quality Commission (CQC)s . Then Health Secretary Alan Johnson announced the appointment of Baroness Young as chair of the organisation on 15 April 2008. She stood down in 2010. The announcement followed an independent recruitment exercise conducted by the House of Lords Appointments Commission and a pre-appointment scrutiny hearing. by the Health Select Committee, which subsequently endorsed Young for appointment as the CQC chair. She held this position until 1 February 2010. On 21 October 2010, Young became the Chief Executive of the health charity, Diabetes UK. Baroness Young resigned from Diabetes UK in 2015 and became Chair of Council of the Royal Veterinary College in 2019, a position she held until August 2025.

Prior to taking up the post of chair of the CQC, Young was the chief executive of the Environment Agency (2000 – May 2008), an appointment which led to her becoming a non-affiliated member in the House of Lords; previously she had taken the Labour whip. Other posts she has held include chair of English Nature; vice chairman of the BBC; board member of AWG plc; Chief Executive of the Royal Society for the Protection of Birds and of a number of local health authorities, including from 1985 Parkside Health Authority (abolished in 1993).

Despite her background with the RSPB, she voted against an amendment that would have led to the installation of swift bricks in buildings across the UK.

== Honours ==
Young was created a life peer in 1997 and has been awarded honorary degrees by the Universities of Stirling (1995), St. Andrews (2000) and Aberdeen (2000), and received an Honorary Doctorate in Science From Anglia Ruskin University.

In 2003 Young sat for a portrait with artist Nicola Kurtz, which is held by the National Portrait Gallery.

In 2010, Young was appointed Chancellor of Cranfield University, standing down in 2020, and was elected an Honorary Fellow of the Royal Society of Edinburgh in 2017.

Academic offices
Preceded by Richard Vincent, Baron Vincent of Coleshill	Chancellor of Cranfield University; 2010–2020	Succeeded by Deirdre Hutton
