= Maurice Wiggin =

English author and journalist

- Born: 1912; Bloxwich, England
- Died: 1986 (aged 73–74); Herefordshire, England
- Known for: Journalism and memoir

Maurice Samuel Wiggin (1912 – 1986) was an English journalist and memoirist. As a journalist, he worked on a wide variety of titles, including the Birmingham Gazette and the Sunday Times. His books include memoirs (with a particular focus on his Black Country upbringing), fishing guides, and contemplations of country life.

== Life ==
Wiggin was born in Bloxwich in 1912. His paternal grandfather, James Wiggin, was the co-founder of J. & J. Wiggin Ltd., a manufacturer of metal parts for the saddlery industry and Old Hall branded stainless steel tableware.

Wiggin attended Queen Mary's Grammar School, Walsall, and received a Third class degree from the University of Oxford. His career as a journalist began at the Birmingham Evening Despatch. At the age of 26, he was appointed editor of the Birmingham Gazette, and later moved to London where he worked as the literary editor of the Daily Express. During World War II, he joined the Royal Air Force, trained as an aircraft fitter at MOD St Athan, and took part in the Normandy landings. He had married his wife Kay by this time.

After the war, Wiggin resumed his career in journalism. As a features' editor on the Evening Standard, he commissioned essays from George Orwell, including The Moon Under Water. For The Sunday Times, he was an angling correspondent and an influential television critic of long-standing. In 1969, Wiggin appeared on a BBC television programme called Colourful One, where he discussed what viewers might expect from the launch of the first British colour television transmissions.

Wiggin retired to Herefordshire and died there in 1986.

== Writing career ==
His books reflected his lifelong interests in working class life, country pursuits, motoring, and literature. Life with Badger, tales of an obese pet cat, was a collection of sketches that originally appeared in the Sunday Graphic. Both Life with Badger and The Memoirs of a Maverick were serialised by BBC Radio 4.

Henry Williamson, author and fellow country pursuits enthusiast, who was championed by Wiggin, dedicated the novel The Power of The Dead (1963) to him.

== Books ==
- My Court Casebook (1948)
- The Passionate Angler (1951)
- Fishing For Beginners (1953)
- In Spite of The Price of Hay (1953)
- Teach Yourself Fly Fishing (1958)
- Troubled Waters (1960)
- My Life on Wheels (1963)
- The Angler's Bedside Book (1965) (editor)
- Life with Badger (1967)
- The Memoirs of a Maverick (1968)
- A Cottage Idyll (1969) Thomas Nelson
- Sea Fishing For Beginners (1970)
- Faces at the Window (1972)
