= Lord Young =

Lord Young may refer to:

- George Young, Lord Young (1829–1907), Scottish judge
- Toby Young, Baron Young of Acton (born 1963), British journalist and social commentator
- George Young, Baron Young of Cookham (born 1941), British Conservative politician
- Michael Young, Baron Young of Dartington (1915–2002), British sociologist, social activist and politician
- David Young, Baron Young of Graffham (1932–2022), British Conservative cabinet minister and businessman
- Anthony Young, Baron Young of Norwood Green (born 1942), British minister and Labour Party life peer
- Edward Young, Baron Young of Old Windsor (born 1966), Private Secretary to the British sovereign

== See also ==
- Baroness Young (disambiguation)
