= South of Scotland (European Parliament constituency) =

Former European Parliament constituency

- European Parliament constituency
- Boundary within Scotland (1979-1984)
- Member state: United Kingdom
- Created: 1979
- Dissolved: 1999
- MEPs: 1

Prior to its uniform adoption of proportional representation in 1999, the United Kingdom used first-past-the-post for the European elections in England, Scotland and Wales. The European Parliament constituencies used under that system were smaller than the later regional constituencies and only had one Member of the European Parliament each.

The constituency of South of Scotland was one of them.

Boundary within Scotland (1984-1999)

== Boundaries ==
1979–1984: Ayr, Ayrshire Central, Ayrshire South, Berwick and East Lothian, Dumfries, Galloway, Lanark, Roxburgh, Selkirk and Peebles.

1984–1999: Ayr, Carrick, Cumnock and Doon Valley, Clydesdale, Cunninghame South, Dumfries, East Lothian, Galloway and Upper Nithsdale, Roxburgh and Berwickshire, Tweeddale, Ettrick and Lauderdale.

== Members of the European Parliament ==
Elected	Member	Party
1979	Alasdair Hutton	Conservative
1989	Alex Smith	Labour

== Results ==
European Parliament election, 1979: South of Scotland
Party	Candidate	Votes	%	±%
Conservative	Alasdair Hutton	66,816	43.0	
Labour	P. N. Foy	43,145	27.7	
SNP	I. MacGibbon	28,694	18.5	
Liberal	J. R. Wallace	16,825	10.8	
Majority		23,671	15.3	
Turnout		155,480	34.5	
Conservative win (new seat)				

European Parliament election, 1984: South of Scotland
Party	Candidate	Votes	%	±%
Conservative	Alasdair Hutton	60,843	37.0	−6.0
Labour	Robin S. Stewart	57,706	35.1	+7.4
Liberal	Mrs. Elspeth M. Buchanan	23,598	14.4	+3.6
SNP	Ian R. Goldie	22,242	13.5	−5.0
Majority		3,137	1.9	−13.4
Turnout		164,389	33.9	−0.6
Conservative hold		Swing		

European Parliament election, 1989: South of Scotland
Party	Candidate	Votes	%	±%
Labour	Alex Smith	81,366	39.8	+4.7
Conservative	Alasdair Hutton	65,673	32.2	−4.8
SNP	Matthew Brown	35,155	17.2	+3.7
Green	John D. Button	11,658	5.7	New
SLD	John E. McKerchar	10,368	5.1	−9.3
Majority		15,693	7.6	N/A
Turnout		204,220	41.5	+7.6
Labour gain from Conservative		Swing		

European Parliament election, 1994: South of Scotland
Party	Candidate	Votes	%	±%
Labour	Alex Smith	90,750	45.2	+5.4
Conservative	Alasdair Hutton	45,595	22.7	−9.5
SNP	Mrs. C. Creech	45,032	22.4	+5.2
Liberal Democrats	David M. Millar	13,363	6.6	+1.5
Liberal	John Hein	3,249	1.6	New
Green	Miss Linda M. Hendry	2,429	1.2	−4.5'"`UNIQ−−ref−0000001B−QINU`"'
Natural Law	Geoff N. W. Gay	539	0.3	New
Majority		45,155	22.5	+14.9
Turnout		200,957	40.1	−1.4
Labour hold		Swing		
