= Wight and Hampshire East (European Parliament constituency) =

Former European Parliament constituency

- European Parliament constituency
- Boundary within South West England (1979–1984)
- Member state: United Kingdom
- Created: 1979
- Dissolved: 1994
- MEPs: 1

Prior to its uniform adoption of proportional representation in 1999, the United Kingdom used first-past-the-post for the European elections in England, Scotland and Wales. The European Parliament constituencies used under that system were smaller than the later regional constituencies and only had one Member of the European Parliament each.

The constituency of Wight and Hampshire East was one of them.

It consisted of the Westminster Parliament constituencies of Aldershot, Fareham, Farnham, Gosport, Isle of Wight, Petersfield, Portsmouth North, and Portsmouth South.

Boundary within South West England (1984–1994)

== Members of the European Parliament ==
Elected	Member	Party
1979	Stanley Johnson	Conservative
1984	Richard Simmonds	Conservative
1994	Constituency abolished	

== Election results ==
European Parliament election, 1979: Wight and Hampshire East
Party	Candidate	Votes	%	±%
Conservative	Stanley Johnson	128,414	64.7	
Liberal	Baroness Seear	35,248	17.7	
Labour	L. F. Bennett	34,901	17.6	
Majority		93,166	47.0	
Turnout		198,563	34.5	
Conservative win (new seat)				

European Parliament election, 1984: Wight and Hampshire East
Party	Candidate	Votes	%	±%
Conservative	Richard Simmonds	96,666	51.7	−13.0
Liberal	Miss S. A. Ludford	53,738	28.8	+11.1
Labour	Jim A. Phillips	36,445	19.5	+1.9
Majority		42,928	22.9	−24.1
Turnout		186,849	34.3	−0.2
Conservative hold		Swing		

European Parliament election, 1989: Wight and Hampshire East
Party	Candidate	Votes	%	±%
Conservative	Richard Simmonds	90,658	44.9	−6.8
Labour	Alan D. Burnett	51,228	25.3	+5.8
Green	Steven L. Rackett	40,664	20.1	New
SLD	Miss Viv A. Rayner	19,569	9.7	−19.1
Majority		39,430	19.6	−3.3
Turnout		202,119	35.2	+0.9
Conservative hold		Swing		
