= Henry McCubbin =

British politician (1942–2023)

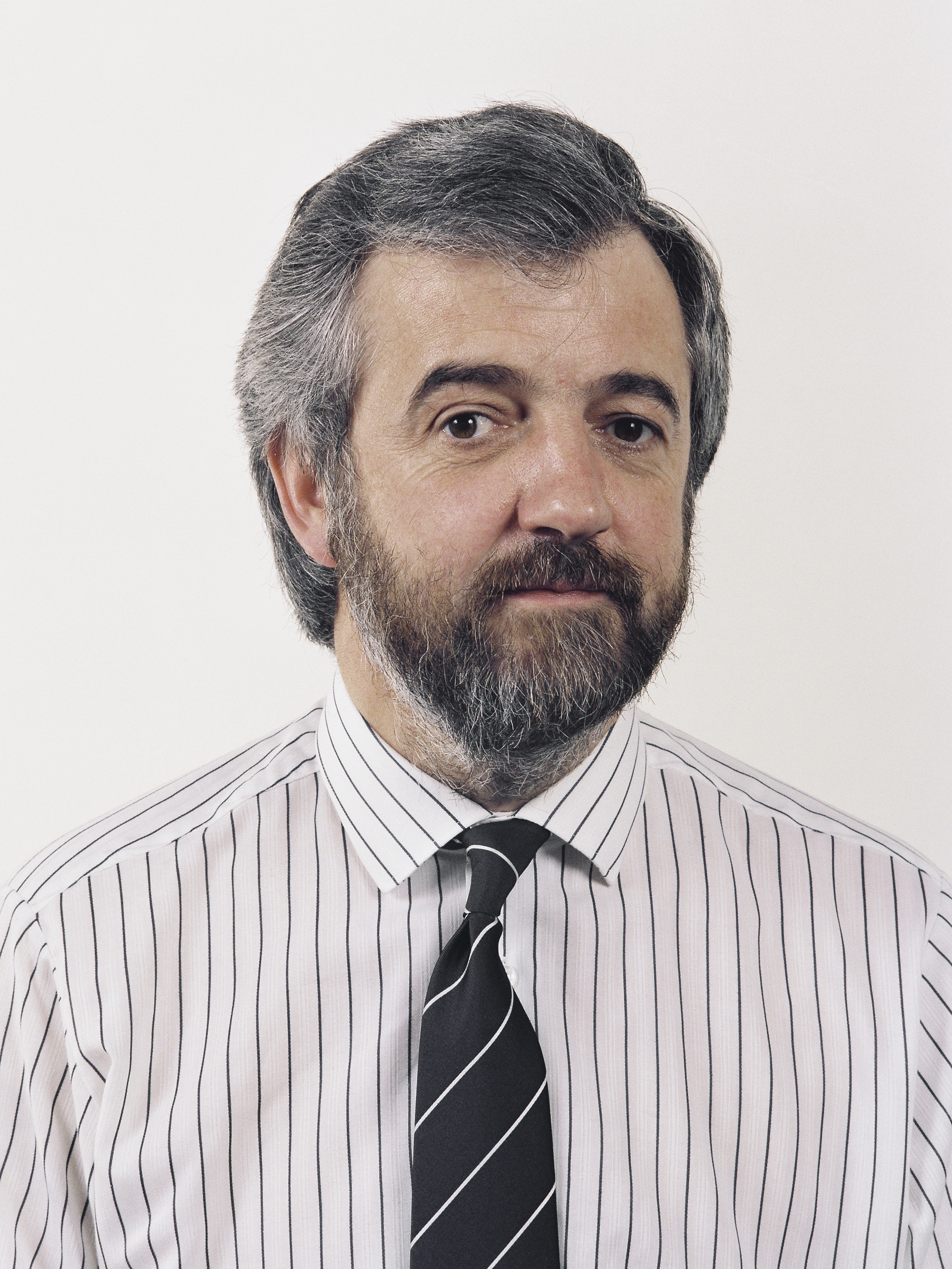
European Parliament portrait

Henry Bell McCubbin (15 July 1942 – 13 November 2023) was a Scottish politician. After a career as a film cameraman for television companies, he served one term in the European Parliament for the Labour Party.

== Early career ==
McCubbin was born in Glasgow and educated at Allan Glen's School. He joined the BBC as a film cameraman, moving to Grampian TV in 1977. He studied at the Open University where he obtained an honours degree.

== European Parliament ==
At the 1989 European elections, McCubbin was elected as Member of the European Parliament for North East Scotland. He had only 30.6% of the vote, and a lead of only 2,613 over the next candidate. McCubbin concentrated on the fishing industry, which employed many constituents and was profoundly affected by the European Union's Common Fisheries Policy. He highlighted the relatively poor deal that Britain received under CFP allocations.

In December 1993, McCubbin wrote a pamphlet together with fellow MEP and veteran pamphleteer Ken Coates which argued that deregulation had harmed the economy, and called for a shorter working week. An analysis of European Parliament attendance records showed him as one of the most diligent of British MEPs. He introduced legislation to improve safety on offshore installations, another key constituency concern. At the 1994 election, McCubbin campaigned on a pledge to reduce unemployment, but was defeated by Scottish National Party candidate Allan Macartney.

== Further political career ==
He kept up contact with the European institutions. He was nominated unsuccessfully for the role of European Ombudsman in late 1994, and in 1996 was appointed as Head of the European Office of the Association of Greater Manchester Authorities. He resigned in 1999 to seek selection as a Labour candidate for the Scottish Parliament, and also attempted to return to Europe when Allan Macartney died and a byelection was held. By this time, McCubbin's left-wing beliefs were regarded with concern and he was ruled out of the selection and placed at the bottom of the party list for the European Parliament.

== Disillusion with Labour ==
McCubbin then resigned from the list completely. He attacked the government of Tony Blair in letters to Scottish newspapers, and in March 1999 confirmed that he had left the Labour Party over the bombing of Iraq. In the 2000 Ayr by-election, he and fellow former MEP Alex Smith appeared at a press conference in support of the Scottish Socialist Party candidate, although he said he had not joined the party.

Later that year McCubbin helped to launch Scottish Left Review, a bi-monthly journal of left-wing politics; he was a member of its Editorial Committee. He subsequently became a member of the Scottish Green Party.

European Parliament
Preceded by James Provan	Member of the European Parliament for North East Scotland; 1989–1994	Succeeded by Allan Macartney
