= Alasdair Hutton =

Scottish narrator (born 1940)

Alasdair Hutton OBE TD OStJ
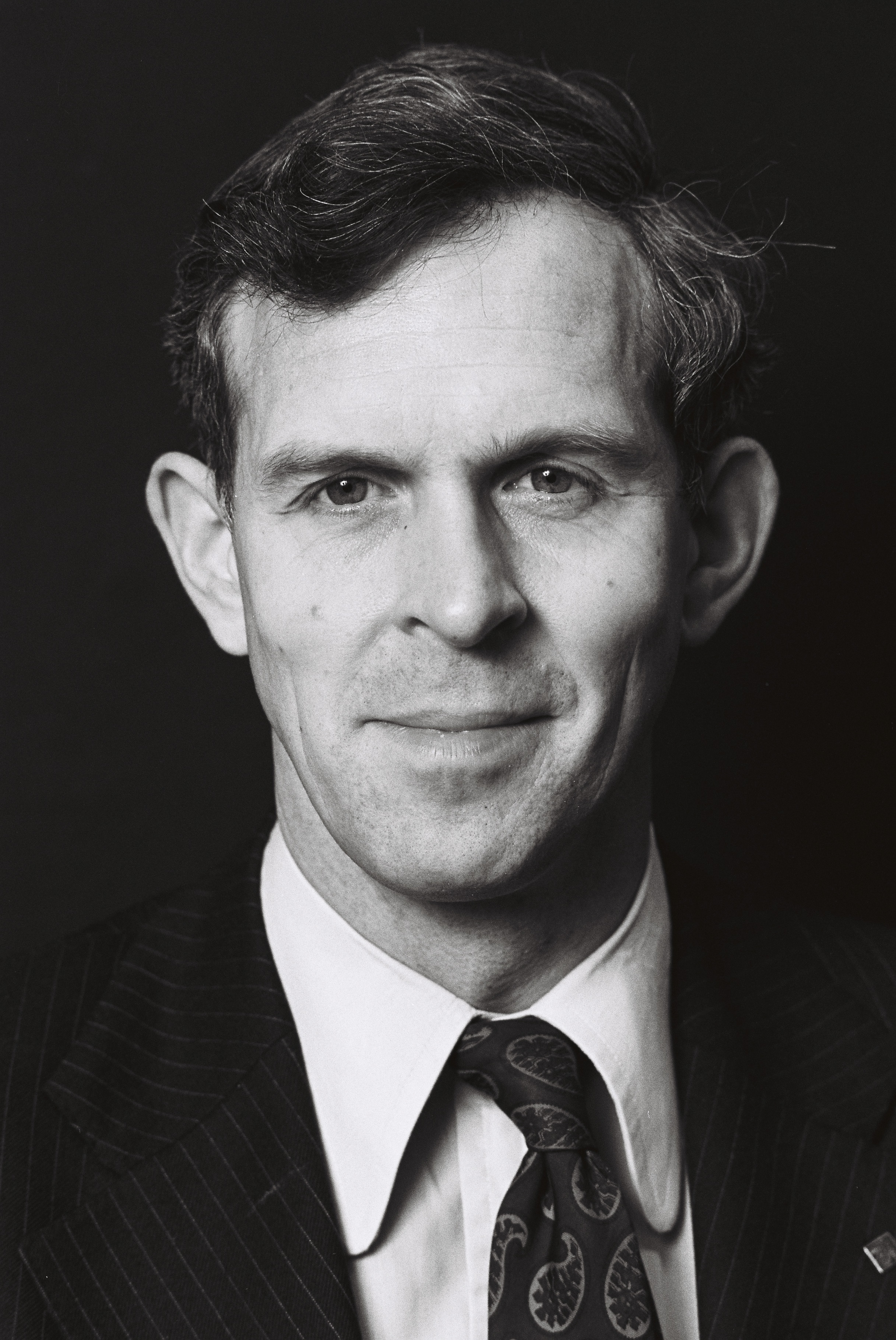

Member of the European Parliament for South of Scotland
- In office 1979–1989
- Succeeded by: Alex Smith

Personal details
- Born: Alasdair Henry Hutton; 19 May 1940 (age 86) London, England
- Citizenship: United Kingdom
- Party: Scottish Conservative
- Spouse: Deirdre Mary Hutton (div.)
- Children: 2
- Profession: Journalist, politician, announcer, writer

Military service
- Allegiance: United Kingdom
- Branch/service: Territorial Army
- Years of service: 1964–1986
- Rank: Major

Alasdair Henry Hutton OBE TD (born 19 May 1940) is a British writer and narrator for public events and concerts, including the Royal Edinburgh Military Tattoo.

== Early life ==
Born in London in 1940, Hutton's house was hit by a bomb three months later, and the family moved to Scotland. Identifying as a Scot, Hutton was educated at Dollar Academy.

Following the death of his father, he moved to Brisbane, Queensland, Australia at fourteen years-of-age, with his mother and two siblings. He continued briefly at Brisbane State High School, which named him among its most distinguished alumni in 2019 and was inducted as a State High "Legend" in 2021.

== Professional life ==
=== Journalism ===
After school hours, Hutton and other students had been taking part in a 4BH programme Rumpus room, including introducing records with the presenter. The following year, walking in and talking to the manager, he got his first job in commercial radio station 4BH in Brisbane at 15. He worked as a journalist on The Age newspaper in Melbourne before he returned to Scotland to become a reporter for The Aberdeen Press and Journal and Evening Express and then a broadcaster with the BBC in Scotland, London and Northern Ireland. He also trained as a film director and was a producer with BBC Radio Shetland.

=== Military career ===
Hutton became a Territorial Army paratrooper with 15th (Scottish Volunteer) Parachute Battalion (15 Para) with which he served from 1964 to 1986, commencing as a second lieutenant in June 1965.

He also served with Central Volunteer Headquarters (CVHQ) attached to 1st (United Kingdom) Division for the next ten years and as Honorary Colonel of the Lothian and Borders Battalion of the Army Cadet Force, from 2006 to 2009.

=== Political career ===
He served for ten years as a Scottish Conservative Party Member of the European Parliament for the South of Scotland European Parliament constituency between 1979 and 1989, and later served as a local councillor on Scottish Borders Council representing Kelso from 2002 to 2012. He was convener for nine years from 2003 to 2012.

=== Later career ===
Hutton became the storyteller and writer of the Royal Edinburgh Military Tattoo in 1992, bringing together his experience in broadcasting, with his weekend "hobby" as a TA paratrooper. Since then he has gone on to become an experienced presenter of tattoos and big shows in the English-speaking world.

Since 1988, Hutton has been a member of the Queen's Bodyguard for Scotland, the Royal Company of Archers.

In 1997 Hutton self-published an anecdotal history of his TA Parachute Battalion, 15 Para: 1947–1993. From there Hutton went onto to publish several children's books, an autobiography of his twenty-five years as storyteller and writer of the Royal Edinburgh Military Tattoo, edited a book on Scottish nursery rhymes, and published a children-focused book on Sir Walter Scott.

== Personal life ==
Hutton married now-Dame Deirdre Hutton DBE, nine years his junior, by whom he has two sons, Thomas and Nicholas Hutton. They are now divorced. He resides in Kelso.

He is a founder member of the Robert Burns World Federation Guild of Speakers. He is or has also been patron and convener, Borders Talking Newspaper; Trustee, LiveBorders; Life member and former chairman, Edinburgh Sir Walter Scott Club; Former chairman and vice-president, John Buchan Society; Chairman, South East Scotland Committee, Saint John Scotland; President, Edinburgh, Lothians and Border Area, Royal British Legion Scotland; President, Kelso Branch, Royal British Legion Scotland; President, Scotland and Northern Ireland Region, Parachute Regimental Association; Elder, Kelso North Church of Scotland.

== Honours ==
Hutton was appointed a member to the Order of the British Empire in 1986 for military service and raised to Officer in 1989, 'for political service'. Awarded the Territorial Decoration in 1977, Hutton was invested as a Serving Brother of the Most Venerable Order of the Hospital of St John of Jerusalem in 2014 and raised to Officer in 2020.

== Publications ==
- 15 Para: 1947–1993 (1997), 40 pages, ISBN 978-0-9530513-0-4. About the Territorial Army (UK) Parachute Battalion
- The Tattoo fox (2013), child fiction, 128 pages, ISBN 978-1-909912-58-8. About the adventures of a Border fox who goes to live on Edinburgh Castle Rock and loves the Royal Edinburgh Military Tattoo
- The Tattoo fox makes new friends (2014), child fiction, 128 pages, ISBN 978-1-910021-47-7
- The greatest show on Earth: Behind the microphone at the Royal Edinburgh Military Tattoo (2017), 224 pages, ISBN 978-1-910745-69-4. An account of the Edinburgh Tattoo and the others Hutton had narrated around the world
- Luath treasury of Scottish nursery rhymes (2017), hard cover, 224 pages, ISBN 978-1-910745-57-1. Editor. Illustrated by Bob Dewar
- Mustard and Pepper (2019), child fiction, ISBN 978-1-9996336-1-5, illustrated by William Gorman. About two Dandie Dinmont terriers at Abbotsford during the time of Sir Walter Scott
- Scotland's greatest storyteller: The life of Sir Walter Scott (2021), 116 pages, ISBN 978-1-9996336-8-4, illustrated by Shalla Gray. For young readers about Scott's novels and narrative poems
- The Castle cat, child fiction, ISBN 978-1-8380379-1-8, illustrated by William Gorman. About the early days of the cat who lives in Edinburgh Castle and who first appeared in The Tattoo fox
- "The Good Witch of Abbotsford", child fiction. Illustrated by Bob Dewar. About how a good young witch at Sir Walter Scott's house of Abbotsford foils a plot by an evil witch and her nasty friends to make unsuspecting children their servants.
