= Simon Murphy (British politician) =

British charity executive and politician

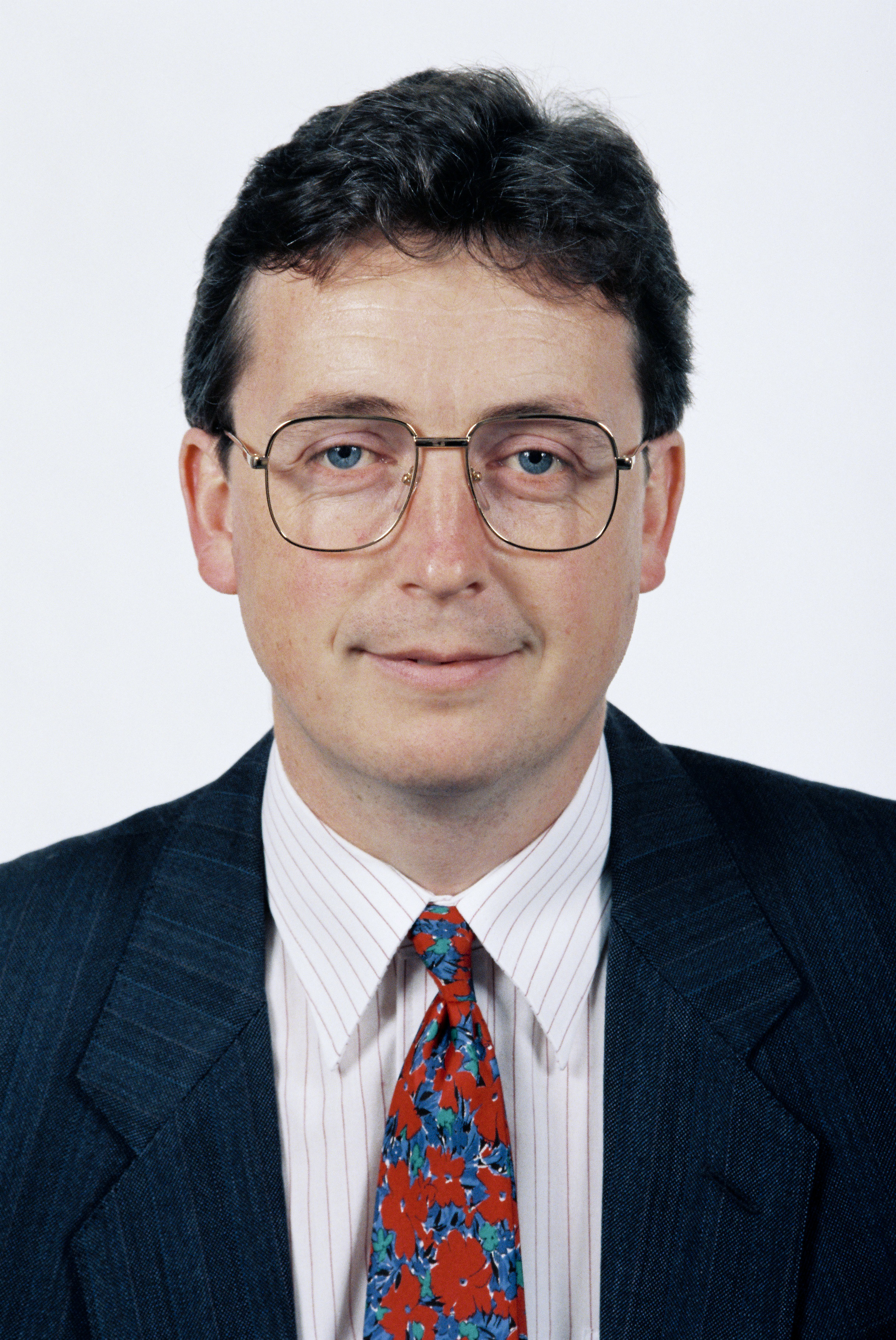

Member of the European Parliament for West Midlands
- In office 10 June 1999 – 10 June 2004
- Preceded by: Constituency established
- Succeeded by: Seat abolished

Member of the European Parliament for Midlands West
- In office 1994–1999
- Preceded by: John Bird
- Succeeded by: Constituency abolished

Personal details
- Born: Simon Francis Murphy; 24 February 1962 (age 64) Birmingham, West Midlands, United Kingdom
- Party: Labour
- Spouse: Bridget Brickley
- Children: 2
- Occupation: Charity executive, former politician

Simon Francis Murphy (born 24 February 1962) is a British charity executive and former politician who was a Labour Member of the European Parliament (MEP) from 1994 to 2004.

== Biography ==
Born in Birmingham, Murphy was educated at the University of Wales, Aberystwyth. He became a university tutor, and also spent time as research and press officer for the MEP John Bird. At the 1992 general election, he stood unsuccessfully for the Labour Party in Wolverhampton South West. He was elected in the 1994 European Parliament election for Midlands West, which covered Wolverhampton, Dudley and parts of Sandwell. He was also a Governor of the University of Wolverhampton from 1996 until 1999. Following the change in the electoral system for the 1999 European election, he was elected as one of several MEPs for the much larger West Midlands constituency, serving until 2004. From 2000 to 2002 he led the European Parliamentary Labour Party, and served as a member of Labour's national executive committee, and vice president of the Socialists Group in the European Parliament.

=== Later roles ===
On leaving the European Parliament he was chief executive and company secretary of Birmingham Forward (a professional services trade association) from 2004 to 2006. He has served as a member of the Better Regulation Commission 2005–2006, the MG Rover Task Force 2005–2006, as a director of Birmingham Professional Diversity (a not-for-profit employment consultancy), Regional Trade Champion 2003–2004, and as a West Midlands Ambassador 2005–2011. He then became director of the Birmingham, Coventry and Black Country City Region from 2006 to 2011, now known as the West Midlands Combined Authority.

Murphy unsuccessfully stood as the Labour candidate in the West Mercia Police region of the 2012 England and Wales Police and Crime Commissioner elections.

He was the interim chief executive officer of the Worcester Community Trust 2013–2015, interim chief executive officer of Groundwork Northern Ireland 2015–2016 and executive director for development and sales, and director of projects, at the ExtraCare Charitable Trust, 2016–2018, and interim chief executive officer of Age UK Plymouth from 2019.

He is the independent non-executive chair of the Sandwell Local Improvement Finance Trust Company (a health infrastructure public-private partnership) known as the Sandwell Estates Partnership. He was the senior independent director, and former chair of the Finance and Performance Committee, and also the Quality and Safety Committee at the then Dudley and Walsall Mental Health NHS Partnership Trust from 2015 to 2019, serving his last five months as interim chair of the board. He was also a non-executive director of the Birmingham Community Health Care NHS Foundation Trust, 2017–2018, as part of an ultimately unsuccessful bid to merge three NHS Trusts into one. From 2014 to 2015 he was the co-founder, and chair, of the Worcestershire Social and Economic Inclusion Consortium, now known as Fusion, a trustee at the Worcester Community Trust from 2016 to }2017, a board member of the Worcestershire Local Enterprise Partnership from 2014 to 2017, and chair of the Worcestershire Food and Drink Federation from 2017 to 2019. From 2013 to 2015 he was the senior independent trustee at Groundwork West Midlands, and chair of its Finance and Audit Committee.

He is also the published author of several articles on fishing for the magazine Waterlog.

Party political offices
Preceded by Alan Donnelly	Leader of the European Parliamentary Labour Party; 1999–2002	Succeeded by Gary Titley
