= Alex Smith (politician) =

British politician (born 1943)

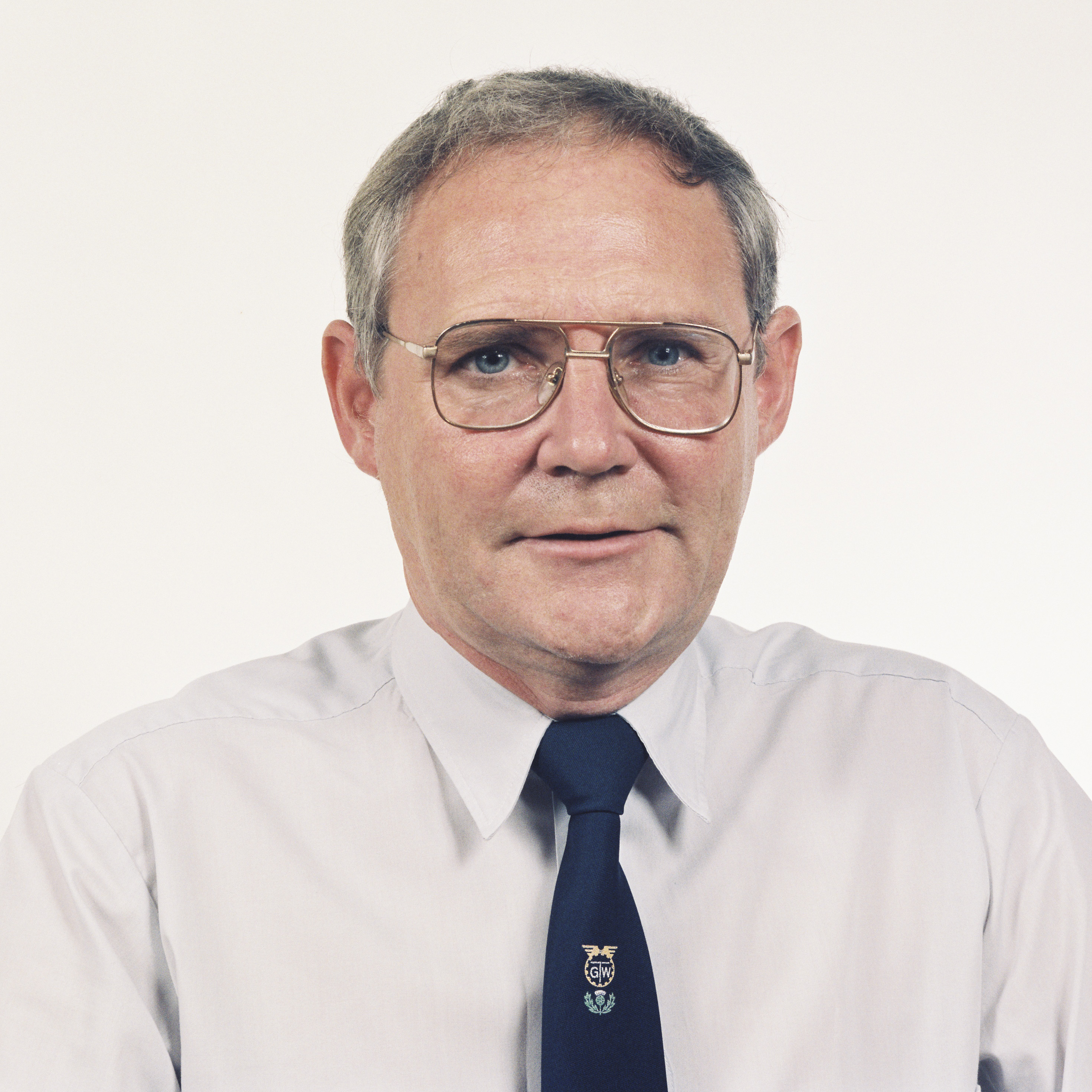
- Official MEP portrait

Member of the European Parliament for South of Scotland
- In office 1989–1999
- Preceded by: Alasdair Hutton
- Succeeded by: Constituency abolished

Personal details
- Born: 2 December 1943
- Died: 19 October 2026 (aged 82)
- Party: Labour

Alex Smith (2 December 1943 – 19 October 2026) was a Scottish politician who served in the European Parliament from 1989 to 1999. Smith was aligned with the Labour left, which was reportedly the reason he was not selected as the party's candidate in the 2000 Ayr by-election.

== Early life ==
Smith was educated at Irvine Royal Academy and worked as a gardener and then a textile worker. He became a shop steward with the Transport and General Workers' Union, and also became active in the Labour Party, chairing Cunninghame South Constituency Labour Party from 1983 until 1987, and also Irvine Trades Council.

== Political career ==
At the 1989 European Parliament election, Smith was elected for South of Scotland. He won the seat from Alasdair Hutton, the Conservative incumbent in 1989 and held it against a challenge from him in 1994. Smith, along with eight other Labour MEPs, voted against a European Parliament resolution supporting NATO's intervention during the Kosovo War in 1999. Scottish political editor Murray Ritchie wrote that Smith's prospects as an MEP were effectively over, having already been sidelined because of his left-wing views and so suggested that he was "merely putting up a show of defiance before he becomes another of Labour's disappeared ones." Smith stood down as an MEP that same year.

According to The Herald, Smith failed to be selected as Labour's candidate in the 2000 Ayr by-election because he had "not embraced every chapter and verse of the Gospel according to St Tony" and therefore was not accepted by proponents of New Labour. Smith, alongside fellow former MEP Henry McCubbin, instead participated in the Scottish Socialist Party's campaign launch for the by-election. Smith stated that he was still a member of the Labour Party "by the skin of [his] teeth", but did not expect to continue as a Labour politician following his public support for the SSP.

== Sources ==
- Ritchie, Murray (2000). Scotland Reclaimed: The Inside Story of Scotland's First Democratic Parliamentary Election. Saltire Society. ISBN 978-0-85411-077-3.
