= Roy McNulty =

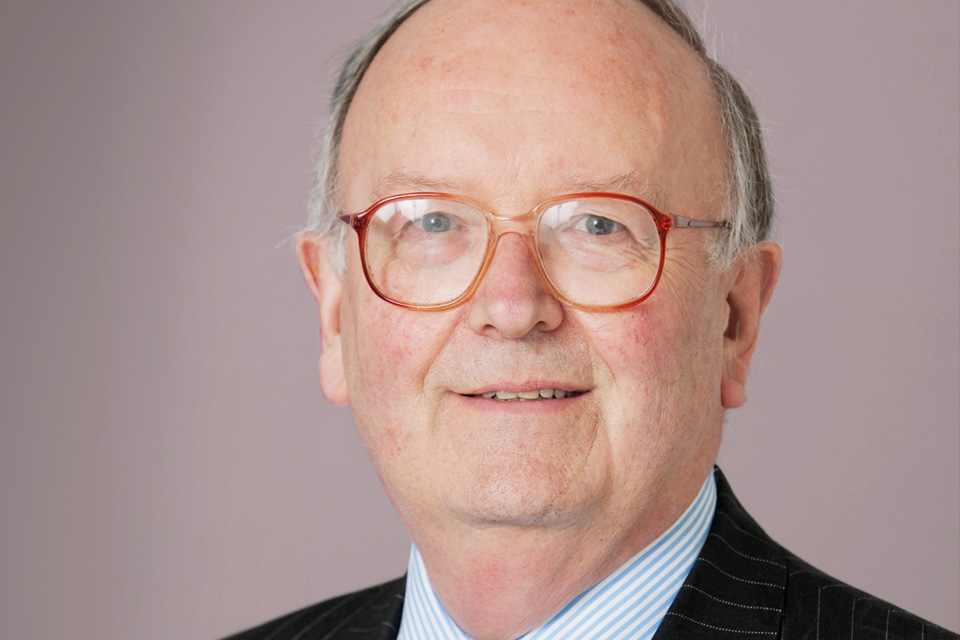
Government photograph

Sir Robert William Roy McNulty, CBE (born 7 November 1937) is a Northern Irish-born businessman.

The son of Jack and Nancy McNulty, he was educated at Portora Royal School in Enniskillen, County Fermanagh and Trinity College Dublin.

McNulty was Chief Executive and Chairman of Short Brothers plc, before its takeover by Bombardier. McNulty was President of the Society of British Aerospace Companies (1993–94) and Chairman of the Department of Trade and Industry Aviation Committee (1995–98). He then became Chairman of National Air Traffic Services (1999–01), and following this chairman of the British Civil Aviation Authority (CAA) (2001–09) He is a non-executive director of Gatwick Airport.

As a private sector contributor to public sector projects as a civil servant, he was Chairman of Ilex URC, the regeneration company for Derry, and Chair of Advantage West Midlands since 2009. Made Deputy Chairman of the Olympic Delivery Authority, he was Chairman of the Rail Value for Money Study sponsored by the Department of Transport and the Office of Rail Regulation. This report made recommendations for the future of rail transport in Great Britain, specifically looking at reducing costs and the franchising system put in place following the privatisation of British Rail. In 2016 it was announced that Sir Roy McNulty would be stepping down from his role as chairman of Gatwick Airport but would continue on the airport's board.
