= Richard Simmonds =

English politician (born 1944)

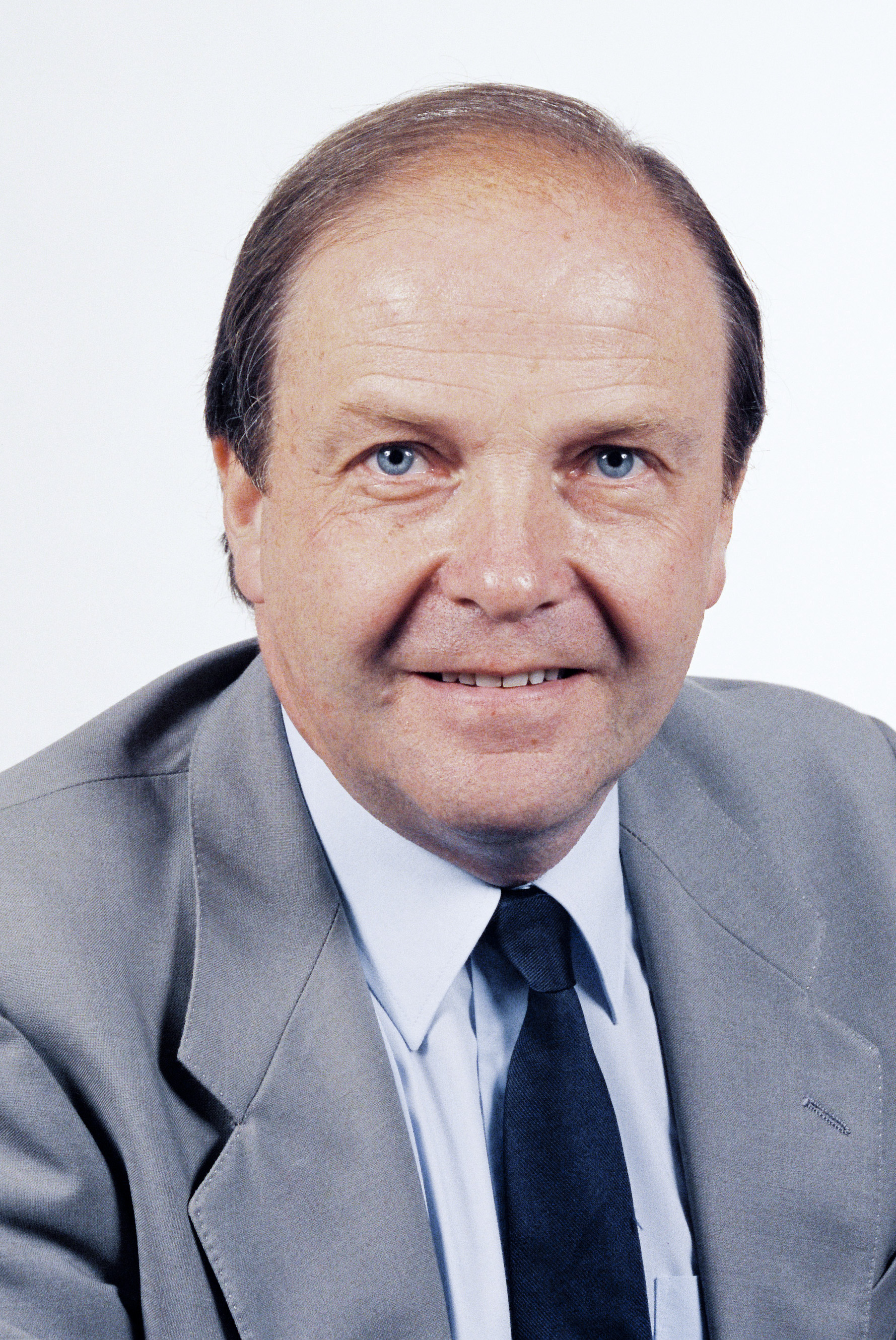
European Parliament photo

Richard James Simmonds, CBE (born 2 August 1944) is a retired English Conservative Party politician. He was a Member of the European Parliament (MEP) for Midlands West from 1979 to 1984 and then for Wight and Hampshire East from 1984 to 1994.

== Biography ==
Richard J. Simmonds was born on 2 August 1944 in Maidenhead, Berkshire.

He was elected to the Parliament in 1979 for the Conservative Party, and started his service on 17 July 1979. During his first term, he joined the Committee on Development and Cooperation on 20 July of the same year, and at the time the Parliament adjourned, was serving on the Committees on Youth, Culture, Education, Information and Sport and on Agriculture until the Parliament adjourned on 23 July 1984.

He was re-elected in 1984, again for the Conservative Party, and served until 24 July 1989. He served as a member of both the Committees on Agriculture, Fisheries and Food and on Budgetary Control; and also participated in diplomatic relations with the People's Republic of China and the Association of Southeast Asian Nations.

He was re-elected in 1989, again for the Conservative Party, and served until 18 July 1994. He served as a member of the committees on Budgets; on External Economic Relations; on Agriculture, Fisheries and Rural Development; and on the Environment, Public Health and Consumer Protection; and participated in diplomatic relations with South America. He was also the Chief Whip for the Conservative Party's European Parliament group. During the vote on the 1995 enlargement of the European Union, Simmonds took a plane to Strasbourg to join the other Conservative MEPs in their vote. Simmonds did not stand in 1994 due to being physically incapacitated by a stroke. He was also chairman of the Countryside Commission.

In 2018, Simmonds, by then a European Commission consultant, informed the Maidenhead Advertiser of his concern regarding the need of a post-Brexit United Kingdom for regulations to be in pace with other European Union members.

== Family ==
His sister is the cartoonist Posy Simmonds.

== Electoral history ==
European Parliament elections
Date of election	Constituency	Party	Votes	%	Result
1979 European election	Midlands West	Conservative Party	69,916	47.3	Elected
1984 European election	Wight and Hampshire East	Conservative Party	96,666	51.7	Elected
1989 European election	Wight and Hampshire East	Conservative Party	90,658	44.9	Elected
