= North East Scotland (European Parliament constituency) =

Former European Parliament constituency

- European Parliament constituency
- Boundary within Scotland (1979-1984)
- Member state: United Kingdom
- Created: 1979
- Dissolved: 1999
- MEPs: 1

Prior to its uniform adoption of proportional representation in 1999, the United Kingdom used first-past-the-post for the European elections in England, Scotland and Wales. The European Parliament constituencies used under that system were smaller than the later regional constituencies and only had one Member of the European Parliament each.

The constituency of North East Scotland was one of them.

Boundary within Scotland (1984-1999)

== Boundaries ==
1979-1984: Aberdeen North, Aberdeen South, Aberdeenshire East, Aberdeenshire West, Angus North and Mearns, Angus South, Dundee East, Dundee West,
1984-1999: Aberdeen North, Aberdeen South, Angus East, Banff and Buchan, Dundee East, Dundee West, Gordon, Kincardine and Deeside, North Tayside

== Members of the European Parliament ==
Elected	Member	Party
1979	James Provan	Conservative
1984	James Provan	Conservative
1989	Henry McCubbin	Labour
1994	Allan Macartney	SNP
1998 (b)	Ian Hudghton	SNP

== Election results ==
1998 By-election: North East Scotland
Party	Candidate	Votes	%	±%
SNP	Ian Hudghton	57,445	48.0	+5.2
Conservative	Struan Stevenson	23,744	19.9	+1.3
Labour	Kathleen Walker-Shaw	22,086	18.5	–9.9
Liberal Democrats	Keith Raffan	11,753	9.8	+1.5
Scottish Socialist	Harvey Duke	2,510	2.1	New
Green	Robin Harper	2,067	1.7	+0.5
Majority		33,701	28.1	+13.7
Turnout		119,605	20.5	–17.2
SNP hold		Swing	+7.6	

European elections 1994: North East Scotland
Party	Candidate	Votes	%	±%
SNP	Allan Macartney	92,892	42.8	+13.4
Labour	Henry McCubbin	61,665	28.4	–2.2
Conservative	Ronald O. Harris	40,372	18.6	–8.1
Liberal Democrats	Simon A. Horner	18,008	8.3	+2.3
Green	Keith D. Farnsworth	2,559	1.2	–6.1
Communist	Mary M. Ward	689	0.3	New
Independent	Lewis R. Mair	584	0.2	New
Natural Law	Duncan J. Paterson	371	0.2	New
Majority		31,227	14.4	N/A
Turnout		217,140	37.7	–0.7
SNP gain from Labour		Swing	+7.7	

European elections 1989: North East Scotland
Party	Candidate	Votes	%	±%
Labour	Henry McCubbin	65,348	30.6	+2.2
SNP	Allan Macartney	62,735	29.4	+8.2
Conservative	James Provan	56,835	26.7	–7.5
Green	E.M. (Mark) Hill	15,584	7.3	New
SLD	Simon A. Horner	12,704	6.0	−10.2
Majority		2,613	1.2	N/A
Turnout		213,206	38.4	+9.7
Labour gain from Conservative		Swing	+4.9	

European elections 1984: North East Scotland
Party	Candidate	Votes	%	±%
Conservative	James Provan	53,809	34.2	+1.2
Labour	Frank Doran	44,648	28.4	+4.2
SNP	Daniel Hood	33,448	21.2	+2.9
SDP	Ian G. Philip	25,490	16.2	New
Majority		9,161	5.8	–2.7
Turnout		157,395	28.7	–4.0
Conservative hold		Swing	–1.5	

European elections 1979: North East Scotland
Party	Candidate	Votes	%	±%
Conservative	James Provan	51,930	33.0	
Liberal	Lord Mackie of Benshie	38,516	24.5	
Labour	D.E. Clyne	38,139	24.2	
SNP	Colin Bell	28,886	18.3	
Majority		13,414	8.5	
Turnout		157,471	32.7	
Conservative win (new seat)				
