= Midlands West (European Parliament constituency) =

Former European Parliament constituency

- European Parliament constituency
- Boundary within the West Midlands (1979-1984)
- Member state: United Kingdom
- Created: 1979
- Dissolved: 1999
- MEPs: 1

Midlands West was a constituency of the European Parliament in the United Kingdom which existed from 1979 to 1999, prior to the adoption of proportional representation in England, Scotland and Wales. It elected one Member of the European Parliament by the first-past-the-post electoral system.

Boundary within the West Midlands (1984-1994)

Boundary within the West Midlands (1994-1999)

== Boundaries ==
1979-1984: Dudley East; Dudley West; Halesowen and Stourbridge; Walsall North; Walsall South; Wolverhampton North East; Wolverhampton South East; Wolverhampton South West.

1984-1999: Dudley East; Dudley West; Halesowen and Stourbridge; Warley East; Warley West; Wolverhampton North East; Wolverhampton South East; Wolverhampton South West.

== MEPs ==
Elected	Member	Party	Notes
1979	Richard Simmonds	Conservative	
1984	Terry Pitt	Labour	Died in office October 1986
1987 by-election	John Bird	Labour	
1994	Simon Murphy	Labour	
1999	Constituency abolished: see West Midlands		

== Election results ==
European Parliament election, 1979: Midlands West
Party	Candidate	Votes	%	±%
Conservative	Richard Simmonds	69,916	47.3	
Labour	S. J. Randall	68,024	46.0	
Liberal	A. W. G. Court	9,936	6.7	
Majority		1,892	1.3	
Turnout		147,876	27.3	
Conservative win (new seat)				

European Parliament election, 1984: Midlands West
Party	Candidate	Votes	%	±%
Labour	Terry Pitt	74,091	50.7	+4.7
Conservative	A. T. (Tony) Burnside	54,406	37.2	−10.1
Liberal	Christopher J. Carter	17,709	12.1	+5.4
Majority		19,685	13.5	N/A
Turnout		146,206	27.4	
Labour gain from Conservative		Swing		

1987 Midlands West by-election
Party	Candidate	Votes	%	±%
Labour	John Bird	59,761	39.2	−11.5
Conservative	M. J. Whitby	55,736	36.5	−0.7
Liberal	Christopher J. Carter	37,106	24.3	+12.2
Majority		4,025	2.7	−10.8
Turnout		152,603	28.5	+1.1
Labour hold		Swing		

European Parliament election, 1989: Midlands West
Party	Candidate	Votes	%	±%
Labour	John Bird	105,529	53.5	+14.3
Conservative	M. J. Whitby	63,165	32.0	−4.5
Green	John Raven	21,787	11.0	New
SLD	Mrs. Fran M. Oborski	6,974	3.5	−20.8
Majority		42,364	21.5	+18.8
Turnout		197,455	37.3	+8.8
Labour hold		Swing		

European Parliament election, 1994: Midlands West
Party	Candidate	Votes	%	±%
Labour	Simon Murphy	99,242	59.5	+6.0
Conservative	G. M. (Mark) Simpson	44,419	26.6	−5.4
Liberal Democrats	Gavin Baldauf-Good	12,195	7.3	+3.8
Liberal	M. S. Hyde	5,050	3.0	New
Green	Chris T. Mattingly	4,390	2.6	−8.4'"`UNIQ−−ref−00000023−QINU`"'
Natural Law	John D. Oldbury	1,641	1.0	New
Majority		54,823	32.9	+11.4
Turnout		166,937	31.3	−6.0
Labour hold		Swing		
