= Ian Hudghton =

Scottish politician

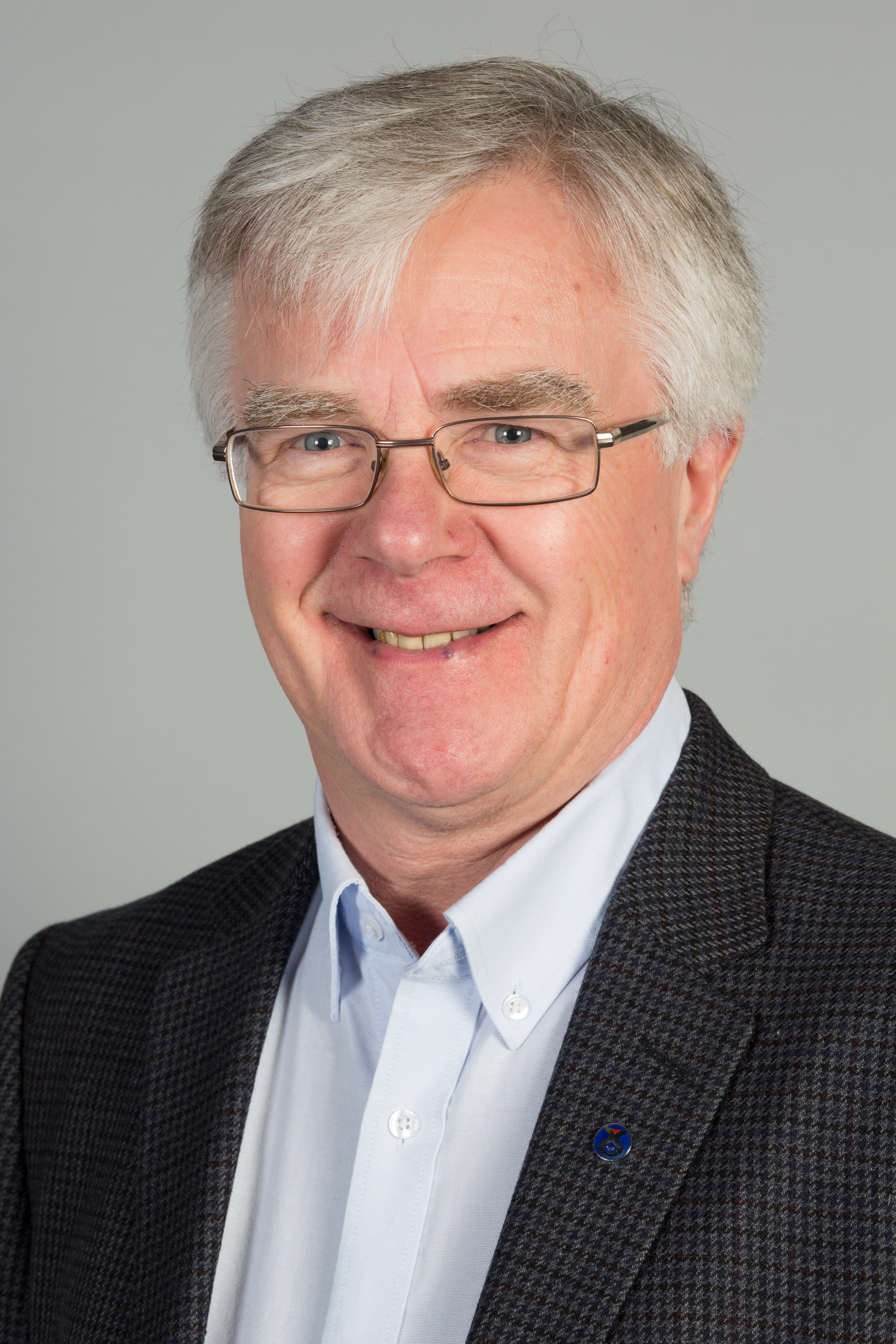

President of the Scottish National Party
- In office September 2005 – 30 November 2020
- Leader: Alex Salmond; Nicola Sturgeon
- Preceded by: Winnie Ewing
- Succeeded by: Michael Russell

Member of the European Parliament for Scotland North East Scotland (1998–1999)
- In office 26 November 1998 – 1 July 2019
- Preceded by: Allan Macartney
- Succeeded by: Christian Allard

Personal details
- Born: 19 September 1951 (age 75) Forfar, Scotland
- Party: Scottish National Party

Ian Stewart Hudghton (born 19 September 1951) is a Scottish National Party (SNP) politician who was President of the SNP from 2005 to 2020. He was a Member of the European Parliament (MEP) for North East Scotland (1998–1999) and its successor constituency; Scotland from 1999 to 2019.

== Political career ==
Hudghton joined the SNP in 1967. He was a District and Regional Councillor and the first elected leader of the unitary Angus Council after its foundation in 1995/6. He had some success as an election agent for John Swinney and Allan Macartney.

He was first elected as a Member of the European Parliament in 1998, when he won his seat in a rare European Parliamentary by-election, following the death of sitting SNP MEP Allan Macartney.

Following the 2004 European elections, Hudghton became a member and Vice-President of the European Free Alliance Group in the Parliament, which retained its own identity within the joint Green-European Free Alliance Group.

He was a member of the Fisheries, Internal Market and Consumer Protection, and Transport and Tourism committees.

In September 2005, Hudghton was elected as President of the SNP, following the retirement of Winnie Ewing. He received a Lifetime Achievement Award at the inaugural SNP Annual Awards in November 2018.

He stood down as an MEP at the 2019 elections.

Party political offices
Preceded by Winnie Ewing	President of the Scottish National Party; 2005–2020	Succeeded by Michael Russell
