= Allan Macartney =

British politician (1941–1998)

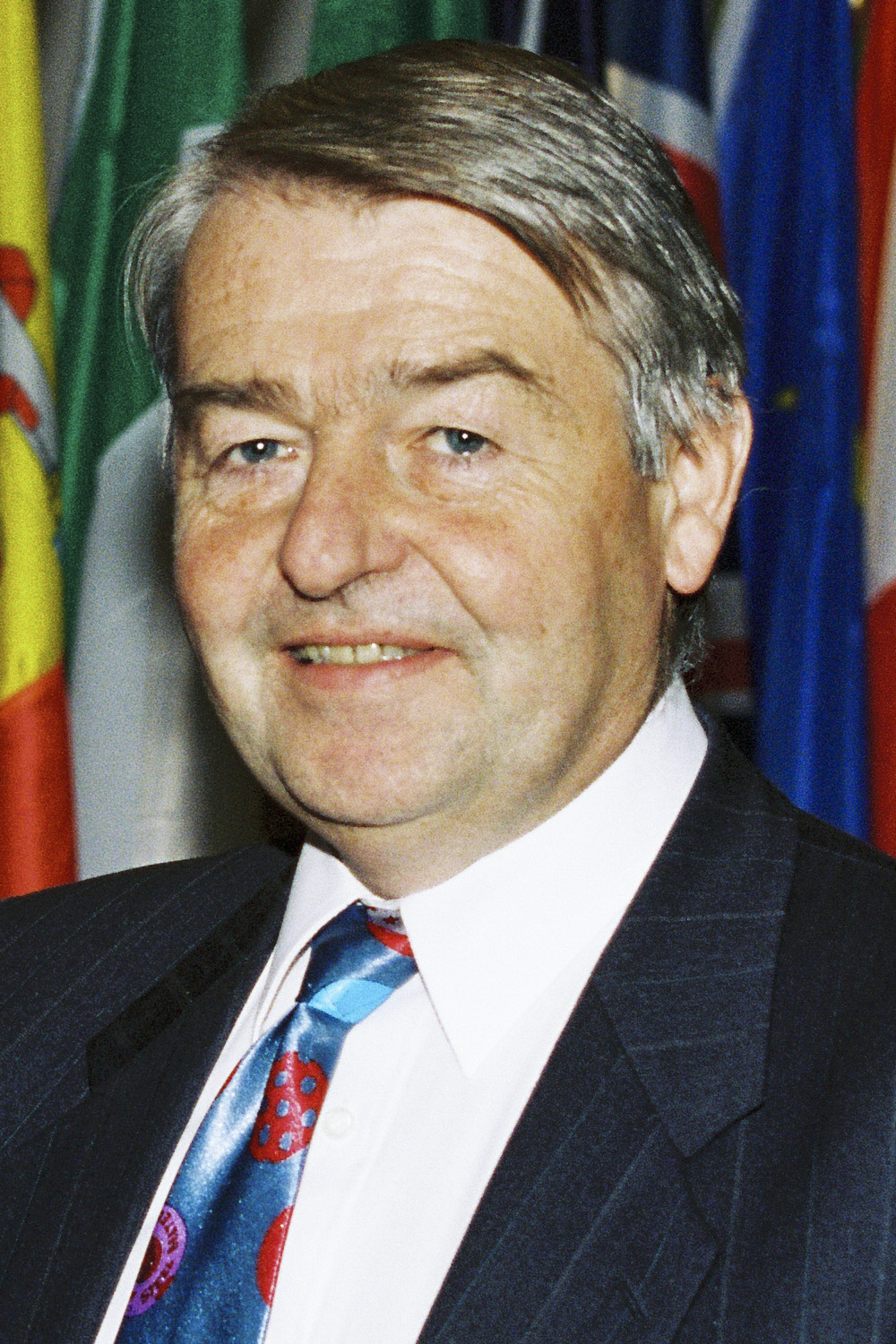

Depute Leader of the Scottish National Party
- In office 25 September 1992 – 25 August 1998
- Leader: Alex Salmond
- Preceded by: Jim Sillars
- Succeeded by: John Swinney

Member of the European Parliament for North East Scotland
- In office 9 June 1994 – 25 August 1998
- Preceded by: Henry McCubbin
- Succeeded by: Ian Hudghton

Personal details
- Born: 17 February 1941 Accra, Gold Coast (now Ghana)
- Died: 25 August 1998 (aged 57) Aberdeen, Scotland
- Party: Scottish National Party
- Spouse: Anne Forsyth (m. 1963)
- Children: 3
- Education: University of Tübingen; University of Marburg; University of Edinburgh; University of Glasgow

William John Allan Macartney (17 February 1941 – 25 August 1998) was a Scottish politician who served as a Scottish National Party MEP for the North East Scotland constituency between the 1994 European Parliament election and his sudden death from a heart attack in 1998.

== Early life ==
Macartney was born in Accra, Gold Coast. He was the son of a Church of Scotland minister, his family soon returned to Scotland and he was schooled in Elgin, Moray. He studied at the universities of Tübingen and Marburg in Germany, and then at the universities of Edinburgh (graduating in Economic Science in 1962) and Glasgow.

Upon completing his studies he returned to Africa as a voluntary secondary schoolteacher in eastern Nigeria (1963−1964). He then worked as a lecturer in government and administration at the University of Botswana, Lesotho and Swaziland from 1966 to 1974. He completed a PhD on the politics of Botswana, supervised by John Mackintosh.

Upon returning to Scotland, he continued his academic career, serving as Staff Tutor in Politics at the Open University from 1975 to 1994. He founded the Unit for the Study of Government in Scotland at the University of Edinburgh, and was elected Rector of the University of Aberdeen.

== Political career ==
While at the University of Glasgow, he was a founder of the Federation of Student Nationalists in 1961. He was also the founder and Provost of the Scottish Self-Government College.

In 1989 he stood as the SNP candidate for North East Scotland in the 1989 European Parliament election where, despite a large increase in the share of the vote, he lost to Labour's Henry McCubbin. After this he was selected as a prospective candidate for the Westminster elections. He was unsuccessful in the 1991 Kincardine and Deeside by-election and at the same seat in the 1992 election.

He was elected SNP depute leader in 1992. In 1994 Macartney was elected as the MEP for North East Scotland gaining the seat with a swing from Labour to the SNP of 7.6%.

Macartney was elected Rector of the University of Aberdeen in 1996.

In August 1998 Macartney was unanimously re-selected as the SNP's candidate for the 1999 European Parliament elections.

== Death and legacy ==
Macartney collapsed and died on 25 August 1998 at his home in Aberdeen. A service of thanksgiving was held in St Machar's Cathedral.

At the 1998 North East Scotland by-election, caused by Allan Macartney's death, Ian Hudghton held the seat for the SNP with a substantially increased majority.

In 2000, the University of Aberdeen introduced a new scholarship in his honour.

Party political offices
Preceded by Jim Sillars	Senior Vice Convener (Depute Leader) of the Scottish National Party; 1992–98	Succeeded by John Swinney
Academic offices
Preceded by Ian Hamilton	Rector of the University of Aberdeen; 1996–1998	Succeeded by Clarissa Dickson Wright
