= Terry Pitt =

British political researcher and adviser

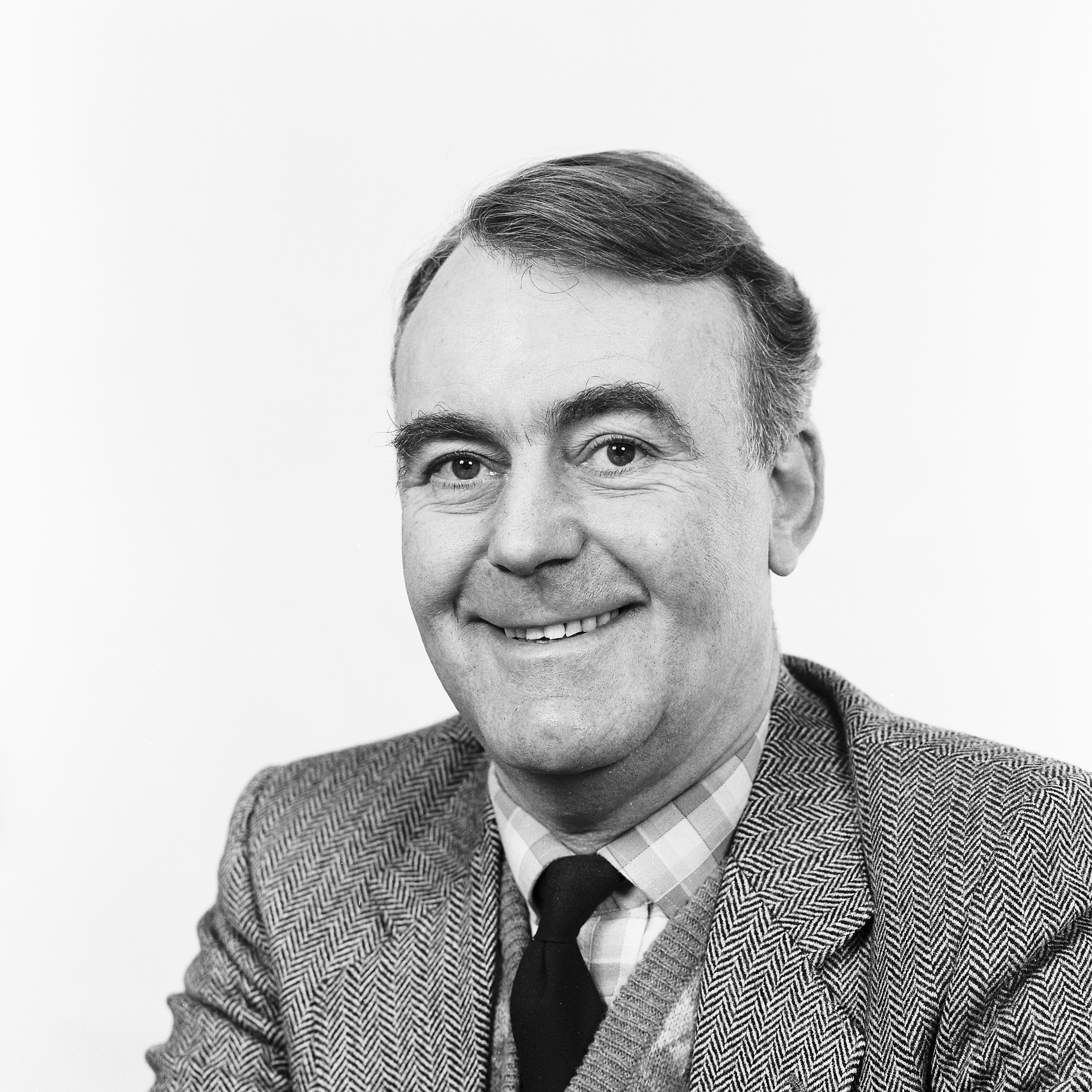
- Born: 2 March 1937; Willenhall, Staffordshire
- Died: 3 October 1986 (aged 49); Birmingham

Terence John Pitt (2 March 1937 – 3 October 1986) was a British political researcher and adviser. He became well known behind the scenes as the long-serving head of the Labour Party's research department, and worked for other bodies. In 1984 he made the move into elected politics as a Member of the European Parliament but died only two years later at the age of 49.

== Education ==
Pitt was born in Willenhall, an urban part of Staffordshire near to Walsall; he attended Queen Mary's School in Walsall and then went on to Birmingham College of Advanced Technology where he studied science. While a student he was active in student politics, including the National Union of Students. In 1963 he contributed to a book on "Nuclear Power Technology" edited by F.J. Pearson.

== Labour Party Head of Research ==
As a committed supporter of the Labour Party, Pitt had joined the Research Department under Peter Shore before the 1964 general election. When Shore was elected to Parliament in the election, Pitt applied for the post of Head of the Research Department. He was appointed early in 1965, after an internal candidate who was favourite for the role resigned on being told that it would not be expanded and salaries would not be raised. The Research Department had a small staff and a crucial role as a new general election was likely to follow within a short period.

Pitt played a key role in running the Labour Party's campaign in the 1966 general election, drafting a manifesto for January 1966, and sitting on each morning's meeting discussing campaign tactics.

He took a particular interest in the Labour Party Young Socialists and challenged the entryist tactics of the various Trotskyist groups by the force of his argument for a democratic Socialist party, thus encouraging the loyalist YS Action Committee, which held off the hard line groups for several years.

=== Promotion prospects ===
When Jonathan Aitken wrote "The Young Meteors" in 1967 identifying the up-and-coming personalities of the late 1960s, he included Pitt as one of them, a favour which Pitt did not appreciate. Pitt was considered as a candidate for the General Secretaryship of the Labour Party in 1968, and considered a frontrunner for Deputy General Secretary early the next year, but was not chosen for either. Later in 1969 Pitt offered himself as a candidate for selection in the safe constituency of Islington East, obtaining the backing of some Islington councillors, but the association selected instead journalist John Grant.

=== 1970 election ===
In the run-up to the 1970 general election, Pitt and his department resisted pressure from Harold Wilson to tone down socialist policies in the preparation of the new manifesto. He again headed the sub-committee writing the actual manifesto, but at a crucial stage Pitt was taken out of the party's planning when he was selected as the Labour Party candidate for Lichfield and Tamworth on 21 May 1970. Pitt beat Keith Kyle and Betty Boothroyd to the nomination.

Although Labour had won the Lichfield and Tamworth seat by 4,134 votes in 1966, Pitt's late selection and the general swing against Labour (which was particularly strong in the West Midlands) meant that Pitt was defeated by 1,976 votes. Writing in 1971 and reviewing a book about the election campaign, Pitt identified a fall in the Labour vote as the reason the party lost, and speculated that it was either the impact of Government measures leading Labour voters to abstain or that Labour voters assumed that victory was certain and failed to vote. Others commented on the similarity of unattributed quotes in the book to opinions which had been voiced by Pitt, implying that he was a key source.

== Policy documents ==
Pitt continued his search for a Parliamentary seat, being defeated in the selection for Cannock in 1971. He moved to the left during the period after 1970, and in spring 1972 he produced a 40,000 word policy statement for the Labour Party which was poorly received by senior spokesmen. Early in 1973 a strategy document written by Pitt was leaked to London evening newspapers; it included a pledge that public expenditure would rise rapidly but no-one earning less than £50 a week (one and a half times average industrial earnings) should have to pay increased taxes.

Later the Research Department's publication of a policy statement calling for nationalisation of the top 25 companies caused a political storm; Pitt defended the statement, asserting that it would not require increased taxation. James Callaghan criticised the Research Department for producing too much policy and not making enough effort to promote existing proposals.

== Special Adviser ==
After the Labour Party returned to government in 1974, Pitt was appointed Special Adviser to Lord President of the Council, Edward Short; he was succeeded as head of the Research Department by Geoff Bish. His role was to prepare a White paper on devolution to Scotland and Wales. However, Pitt resigned in October 1974, a decision said to be motivated by his reluctance to be a civil servant for a lengthy period. After leaving he denounced the Civil Service as a "status quo organisation" that would not "pursue any sort of radical policy".

== Walsall North selection ==
After leaving the Civil Service, Pitt became a freelance writer and consultant on government affairs. Pitt had another chance to get into Parliament in early 1975 when the disappearing Labour MP John Stonehouse was traced to Australia, and his constituency party called on him to resign; Pitt was said to be the frontrunner for the selection in Walsall North. However Stonehouse refused to resign, and the delayed selection eventually chose David Winnick instead. In 1978 Pitt contributed to John Mackintosh's book "People and Parliament".

== Later career ==
In 1978 Pitt became a founding director of the Institute of National Affairs of Papua New Guinea, a public policy think tank addressing economic and social issues in that then newly independent nation, working overseas for three years. He returned to the United Kingdom in 1981 to be Senior Adviser on Economic Development to the Labour-run West Midlands County Council. At the 1984 election to the European Parliament, Pitt was selected as Labour candidate for Midlands West, a constituency which included the towns of Dudley and Wolverhampton; he won the seat by 19,685 votes.

Pitt was appointed to the Committee on Budgets, and became the spokesman on budgets for the Labour group of Members. In March 1986 he protested at the European Communities' sale of 750,000 tonnes of beef to non-member countries at discounted prices, complaining that it had cost £500m in subsidies and £320m in storage costs. He also sat on the Delegation for relations with Australia and New Zealand.

== Death ==
On 3 October 1986 Pitt collapsed in a taxi in Birmingham, and was taken to East Birmingham hospital. He died there later that day at the age of 49. The circumstances required an inquest which found that death was caused by Pitt choking on chewing gum. He had taken up using nicotine-replacement gum after giving up smoking. The inquest also found that Pitt had a heart condition which could have killed him at any time and returned a verdict of accidental death.

Party political offices
Preceded by Peter Shore	Secretary of the Research Department of the Labour Party; 1965–1974	Succeeded by Geoff Bish
