= List of Old Emanuels =

This is a list of notable former pupils and staff of Emanuel School, London, England.

== Notable Old Emanuels ==
=== Armed forces ===
- William Bailey OBE - head and then political advisor of the Special Operations Executive (SOE)
- Sholto Douglas, 1st Baron Douglas of Kirtleside – Marshal of the Royal Air Force, at Emanuel 1904–1905
- Edward Thomas MC – noted for his part in the Battle of Halfaya Pass

=== Arts and entertainment ===
- Naveen Andrews – actor, star of Lost, and The English Patient
- John Banting – artist
- Alan Caddy – guitarist with The Tornados
- Derek Davis – ceramic artist
- Rupert Degas – actor
- Hero Fiennes Tiffin
- Tallulah Haddon - actor and model
- Jack Hedley – actor
- Leslie Henson – actor
- Douglas Hickox – film director
- Chris Hughes – record producer, and Adam and the Ants drummer, aka Merrick
- William Lovelock – composer and pedagogue
- Richard Marquand – film director, director of Return of the Jedi
- Ben Moore – artist and curator
- Gordon Murray – puppeteer (Camberwick Green, Chigley, Trumpton)
- Joseph Quinn – actor (Stranger Things, Catherine the Great)
- Mick Rock – rock photographer
- Sadie Soverall - actor (Saltburn, Fate: The Winx Saga)
- Ben Wilkins - BAFTA and Oscar-winning sound editor

=== Clergy ===
- Barney Hopkinson – formerly Rector of Wimborne Minster 1981–1986; Archdeacon of Sarum 1986–1998; and Archdeacon of Wilts 1998–2004
- John Bertram Phillips – theologian and clergyman

=== Industry ===
- Neil Carson OBE – formerly CEO Johnson Matthey
- Dheeraj Hinduja - Chairman of Ashok Leyland and Director of Hinduja Automotives Ltd

=== Law ===
- Laurie Shaffi OBE

=== Literature ===
- Kevin Jackson FRSA - Writer and film maker
- Vernon Richards – anarchist writer and photographer
- N. F. Simpson – dramatist
- Michael Vince – poet and author
- Clive Wilmer – poet and Fellow of Fitzwilliam College and Sidney Sussex College, Cambridge
- Emma Healey – author

=== Media ===
- Michael Aldred – co-presenter of Ready Steady Go!
- Michael Aspel – broadcaster
- Mark Baker - animator and Peppa Pig creator
- Clive Barnes – theatre critic
- Simon Barnes – chief sports correspondent for The Times
- Bill Boorne – theatre critic and journalist
- Andi Peters – television presenter and producer
- Paul Rambali – music journalist and author

=== Other professions ===
- Asif Aziz – billionaire landlord
- Charles Walter Clark – main architect for the Metropolitan Line on the London Underground
- Michel Albert Roux – two-starred Michelin chef and restaurateur and presenter of Masterchef
- Tomasz Starzewski – designer

=== Politics, public administration, and diplomacy ===
- Richard Adams MP – politician, formerly Lord Commissioner of the Treasury
- Peter Betts CB - civil servant focused on Climate Change, Department for Business, Energy and Industrial Strategy, Climate Change focus shifted to the Department of Energy and Climate Change; previously Director of International Climate Change at the Department for Environment, Food and Rural Affairs
- Sir Alfred Butt – politician formerly Director of Food Rationing at the Ministry of Food, theatre manager, race horse owner and breeder
- Ernest Crutchley CB, CMG, CBE – Minister (Political)/Deputy High Commissioner Australia
- Sir Arthur Galsworthy KCMG – British Ambassador to Ireland and formerly British High Commissioner to New Zealand
- Sir John Galsworthy KCVO, CMG – British Ambassador to Mexico
- Sir William Geraghty KCB – Second Permanent secretary, Ministry of Defence
- Sir John Hawton KCB – Permanent Secretary at the Ministry of Health, instrumental in the establishment of the National Health Service
- Peter Hain, Baron Hain – formerly Secretary of State for Wales; previously Secretary of State for Work and Pensions, Secretary of State for Northern Ireland; Leader of the House of Commons and Lord Privy Seal
- Mark MacGregor - politician and formerly Conservative Party chief executive 2002-03, 2004 Mayoral campaign manager, and Policy Exchange deputy director
- Geoffrey Robinson MP – formerly Paymaster General
- Mark MacGregor – politician, formerly Conservative Party chief executive
- Matthew Taylor – chief executive of the Royal Society of Arts
- Charles Wilfrid Scott-Giles – Fitzalan Pursuivant of Arms Extraordinary
- Sir Sebastian Wood KCMG – British Ambassador to Germany; formerly British Ambassador to China, and Principal Private Secretary to the Cabinet

=== Professors and distinguished thinkers ===
- Sir Tim Berners-Lee OM, KBE, FRS – inventor of the World Wide Web, recipient of the Millennium Technology Prize and professor at MIT
- Edward L. G. Bowell – astronomer, Lowell Observatory
- Tony Brooker – emeritus professor of computer science, University of Essex
- J. Duncan M. Derrett – emeritus professor of Oriental laws, University of London
- Derek Fray – FRS, FREng professor of materials chemistry, and fellow, Fitzwilliam College, Cambridge; formerly assistant professor of Metallurgy at MIT
- Robert Gibson – emeritus professor of engineering science, King's College, London
- A. C. Gimson – phonetician and head of the department of phonetics and linguistics, UCL
- Peter Goddard CBE, FRS – mathematical physicist, director of the Institute for Advanced Study, Princeton; formerly Master of St John's College, Cambridge; Honorary Fellow Isaac Newton Institute
- Ivor James – professor of cello, Royal College of Music
- Tony Judt – historian, and Erich Maria Remarque Professor in European Studies, New York University; nominated for the 2006 Pulitzer Prize for General Nonfiction.
- Tom Kemp – Marxist economic historian and political theorist; formerly Reader in Economic History at the University of Hull
- William Lovelock – composer
- George Lyward – educationalist, psychotherapist, (Emanuel School, Glenalmond College, and The Perse School under W. H. D. Rouse), and founder of Finchden Manor therapeutic community for young people
- David Marquand – academic, visiting fellow and formerly principal of Mansfield College, Oxford; ex-Labour Party MP and SDP co-founder
- Mark Miodownik MBE, FREng – materials scientist, University College London
- Denis Noble CBE, FRS , emeritus professor and co-director of Computational Physiology, Balliol College, Oxford; formerly Burdon Sanderson Professor of Cardiovascular Physiology
- John Paynter OBE – composer and emeritus professor of music University of York
- Edward P. F. Rose – paleontologist and geologist
- Sir Owen Saunders FRS, FREng, – emeritus professor of mechanical engineering, fellow, and formerly rector of Imperial College, London, and vice-chancellor of the University of London

=== Royalty and other nobility ===
- Pengiran Muda Abdul Hakeem of Brunei
- Prince Al-Muhtadee Billah Bolkiah of Brunei

=== Sport ===
==== Rowing ====
- Clint Evans – member of the 2005 Atlantic Rowing Race, overall winning crew and winning pairs team: C^{2}
- Malcolm McGowan – Great Britain Olympic oarsman at the 1980 Olympics; silver medalist men's eight & 1984 Olympics Finalist
- Anton Obholzer – Great Britain Olympic oarsman at the 1988 Games. Member of GB Eight that came 4th
- Clive Roberts – Great Britain Olympic oarsman in Los Angeles, 1984. Member of GB Eight that came 5th

==== Rugby ====
- George Littlewood Hirst – Wales and Barbarians rugby international 1912–1914
- Tom Smith – Scotland and Lions rugby International
- Bruce Neale – England rugby international

==== Cricket ====
- John Cole – first-class cricketer and British Army officer
- Ian Payne – cricketer
- Stuart Surridge – cricketer
- Leonard Shelton Heath Summers – cricketer

==== Athletics ====
- Peter Reed – Great Britain Olympic long jumper in the 1968 Summer Olympics

== Notable Masters ==
- J. A. Cuddon – Writer, works include A Dictionary of Literary Terms and Literary Theory
- Tristram Jones-Parry – Headmaster of Emanuel School 1994–1998; Headmaster of Westminster School 1998–2004
- Tom Winnifrith - Classics Scholar
