= List of alumni of St Edmund Hall, Oxford =

This is a list of notable alumni of St Edmund Hall, Oxford, one of the constituent colleges of University of Oxford, and informally known as Teddy Hall. The overwhelming maleness of this list is partially explained by the fact that for roughly 95% of its history (from its foundation in 1278 until 1979), women were barred from studying at the college.

See also Category:Alumni of St Edmund Hall, Oxford.

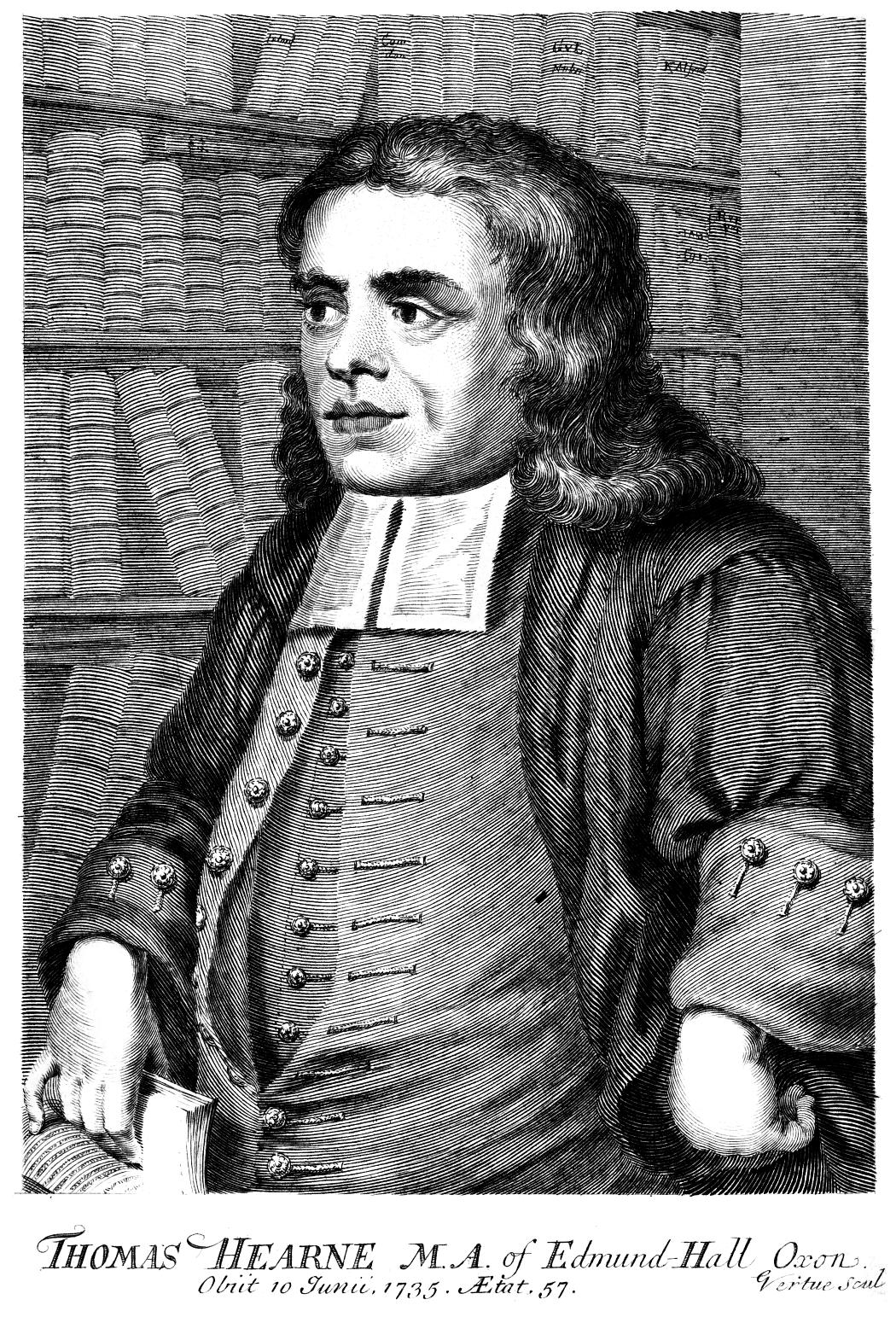
Thomas Hearne, antiquarian

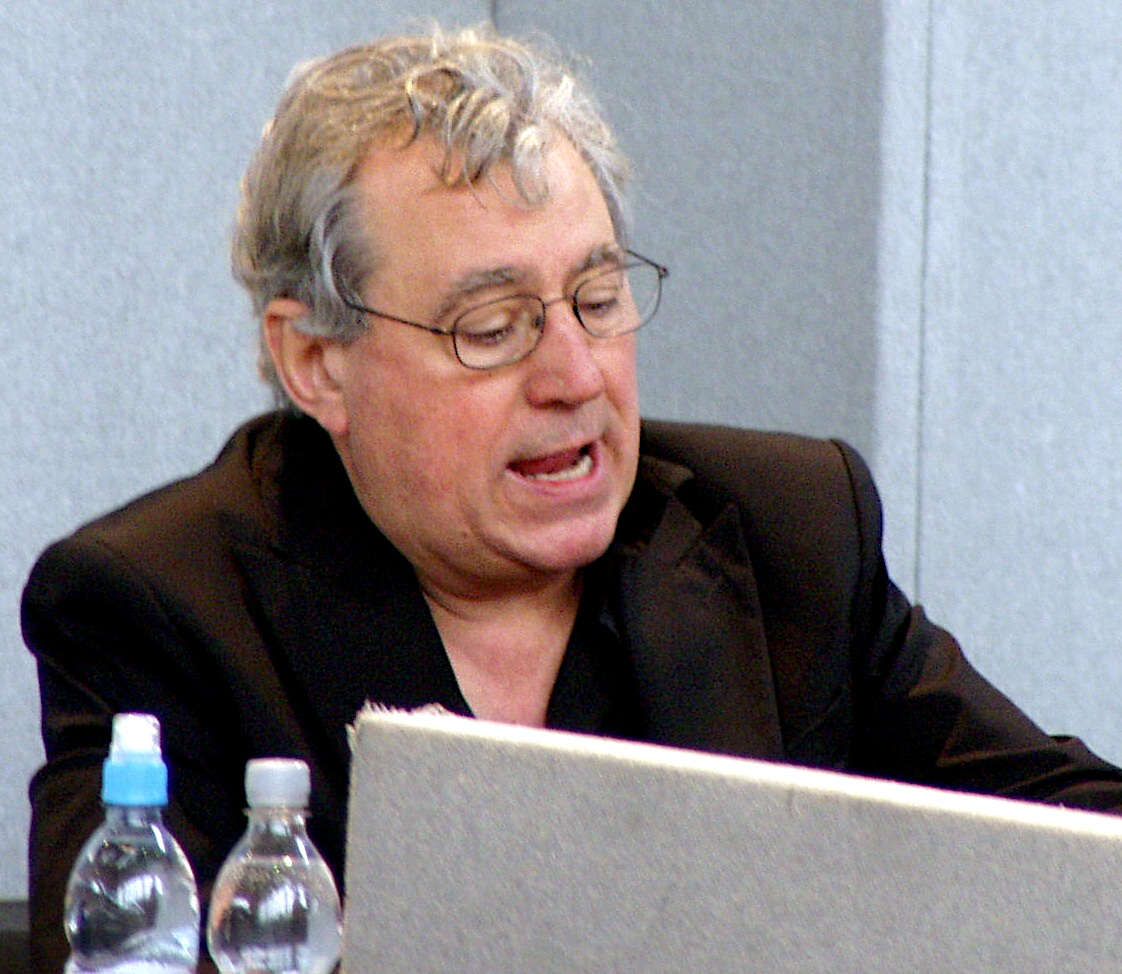
Terry Jones, actor, comedian and writer

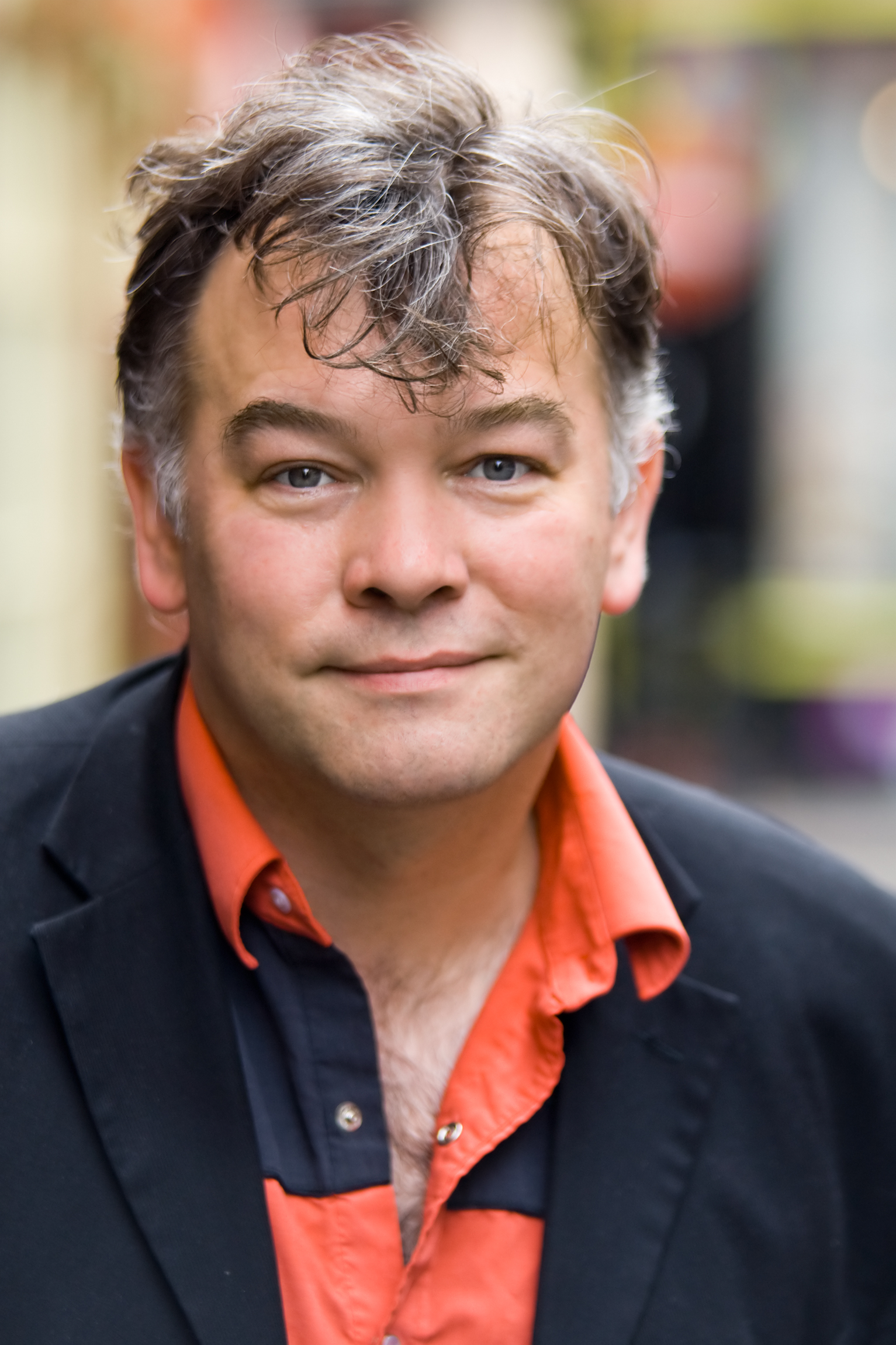
Stewart Lee, comedian

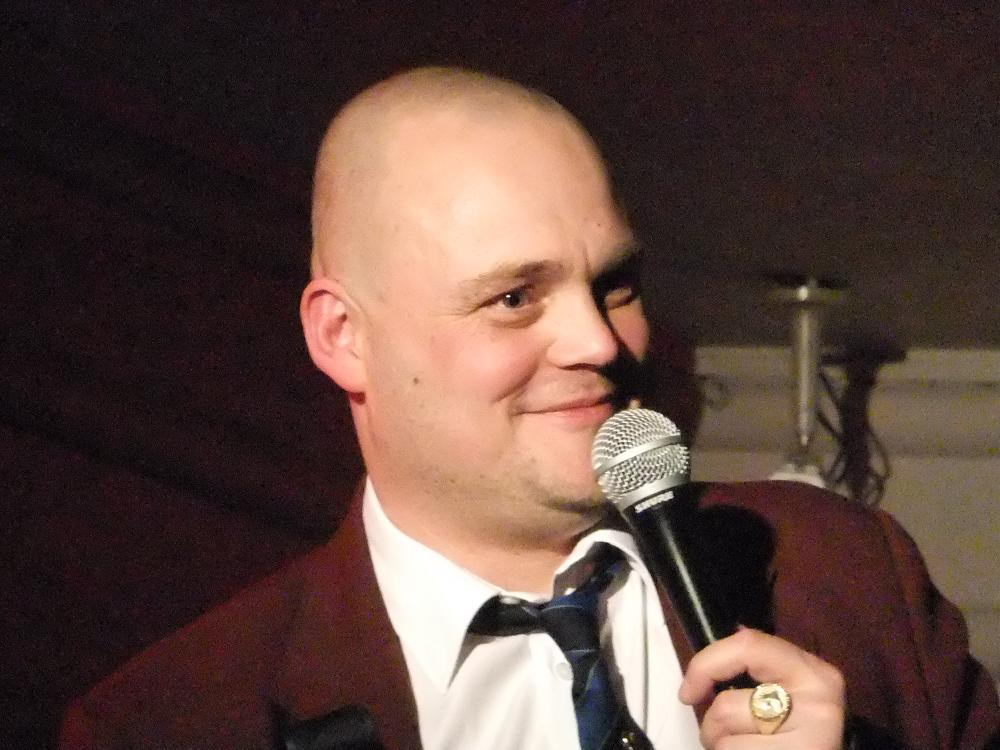
Al Murray, comedian

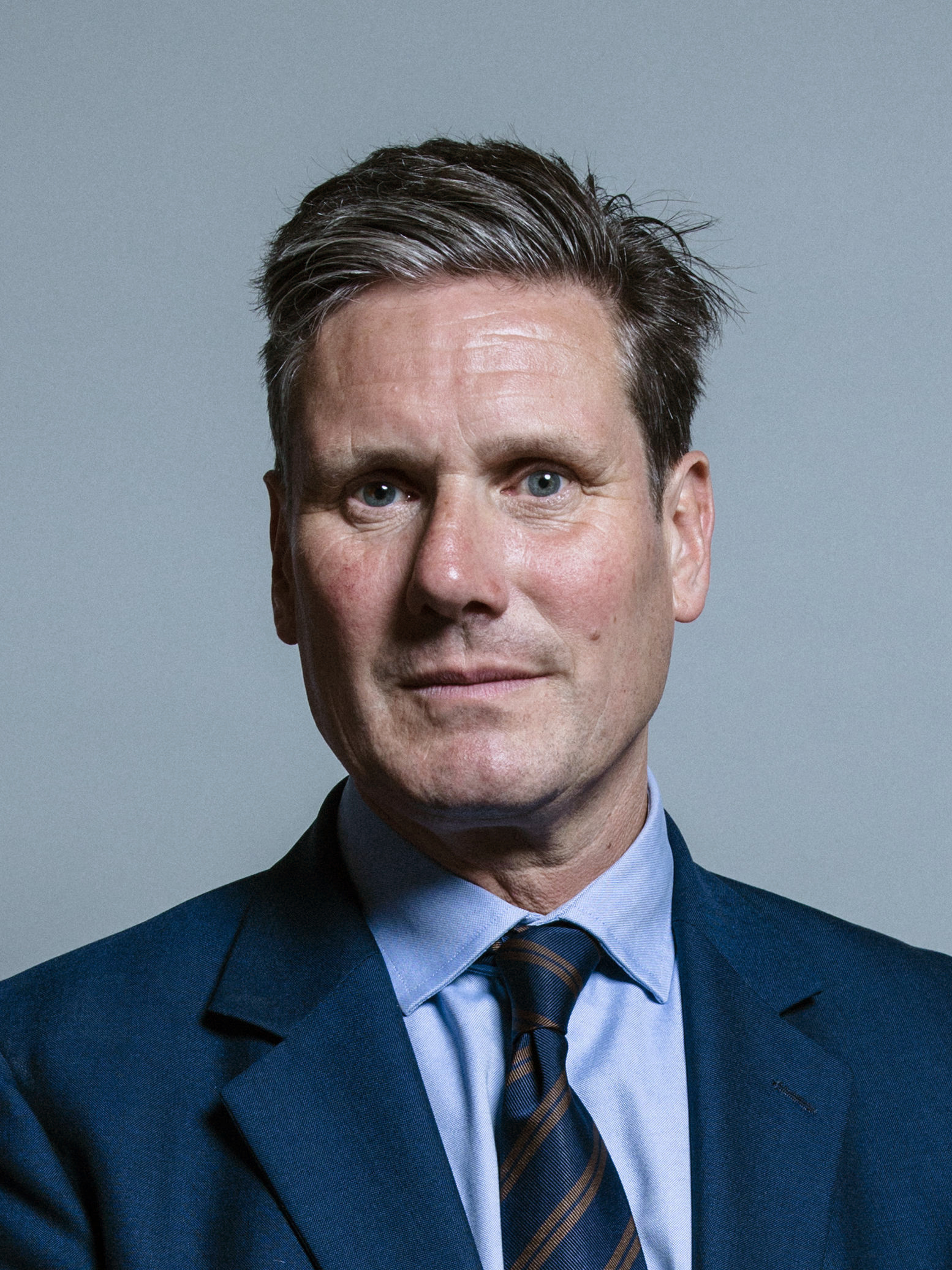
Keir Starmer, Prime Minister of the United Kingdom

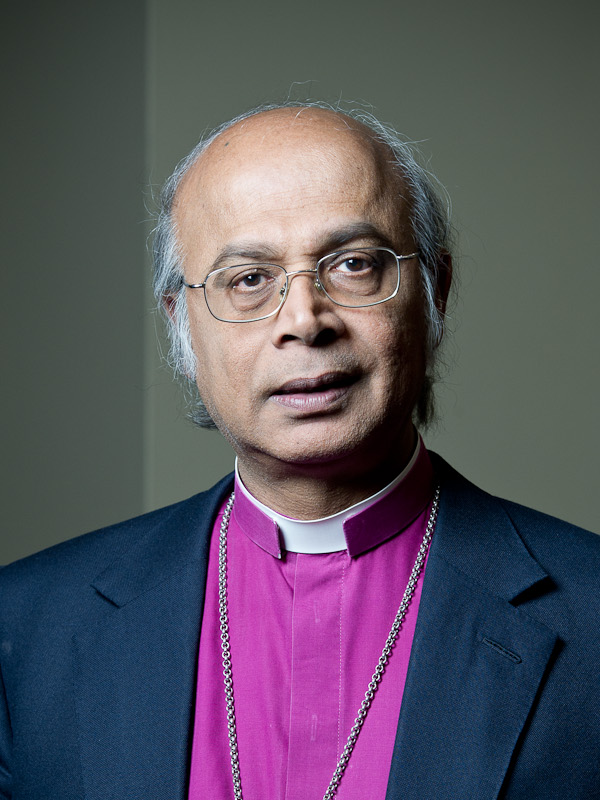
Michael Nazir-Ali, former Bishop of Rochester

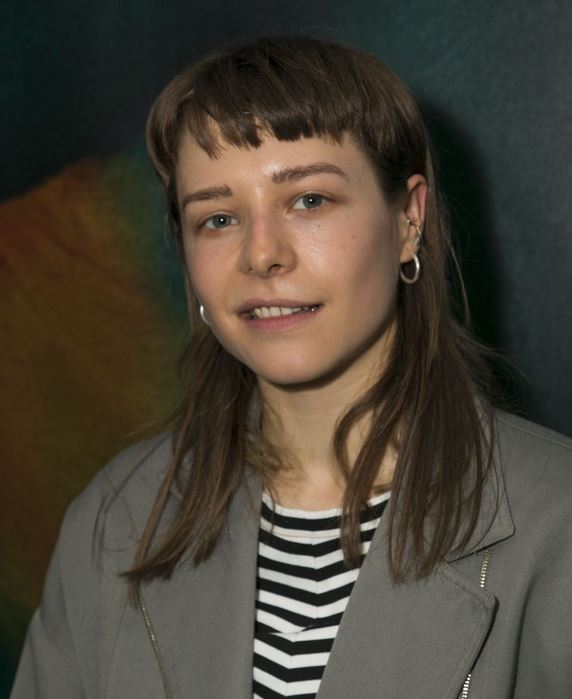
Emma D'Arcy, actor

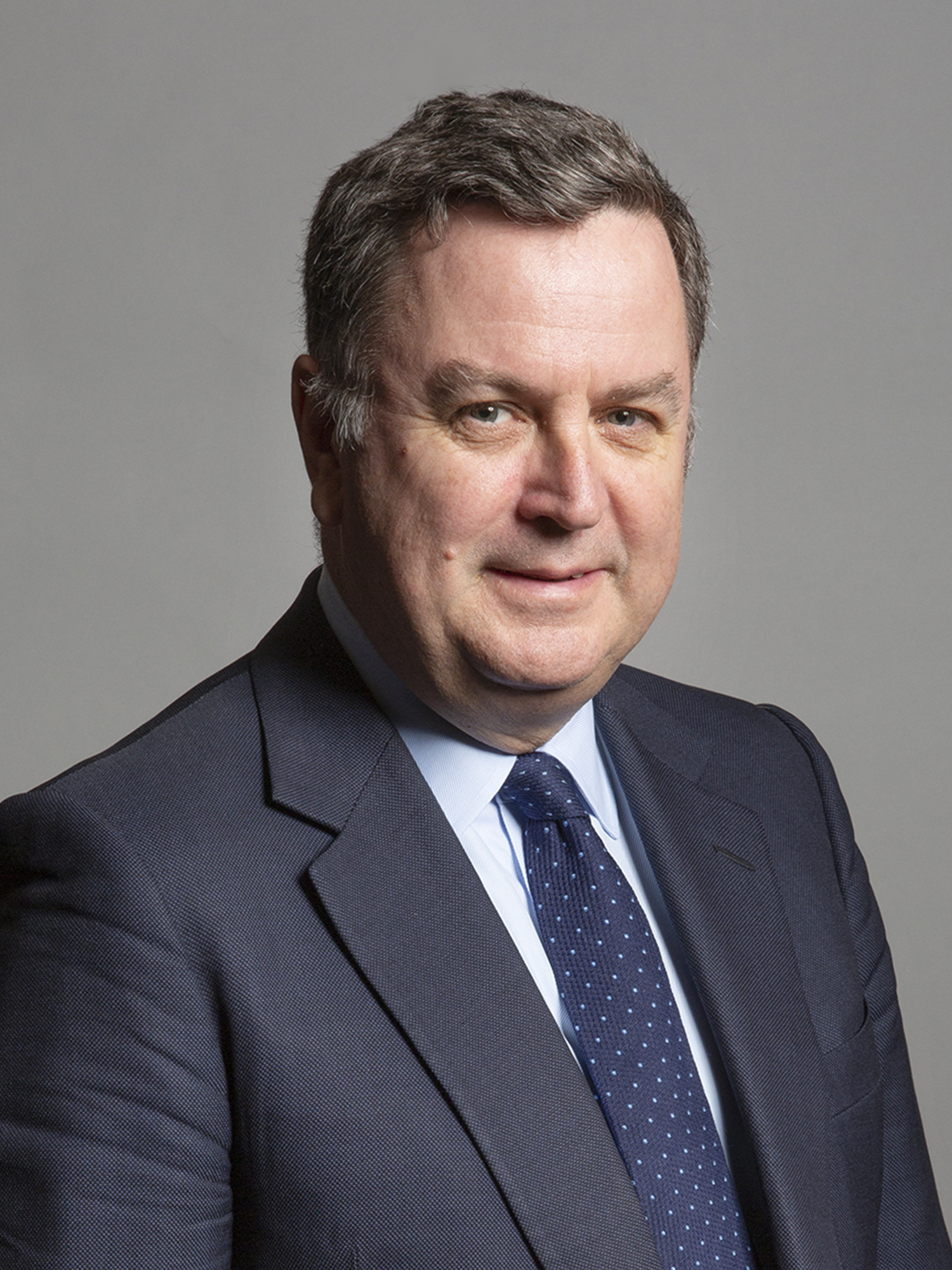
Mel Stride, politician
- Dan Abnett, author, comic book writer
- Samira Ahmed, radio news presenter
- John Arnway, English royalist divine
- Lionel Barber, journalist and editor of the Financial Times
- Stuart Barnes, England and British Lions rugby player, 1984–1993; commentator for Sky Sports from 1994
- Bidisha, writer and commentator on cultural and social affairs
- Steve Blinkhorn, psychologist, psychometrician
- Anna Botting, newsreader
- Douglas Botting, explorer and author
- Emma Brockes, journalist
- Sir Stanley Burnton, Lord Justice of Appeal, 2008–2015
- John Camkin, journalist, television sports broadcaster and businessman
- Maggie Carver, businesswoman
- David Cooksey, businessman, venture capitalist and politician
- Emma D'Arcy, actor
- Jeremy Davies, Catholic priest and exorcist
- Peter Day, broadcaster
- Robin Day, broadcaster
- Nicholas Evans, English screenwriter and journalist
- Paul Farrelly, Labour MP for Newcastle-under-Lyme, 2001–2019
- Mark Field, Conservative MP for the Cities of London and Westminster, 2001–2019
- Doug Fisher, comedy actor, Larry in Man About The House
- Amelia Fletcher, economist and musician
- Stuart Ford, film producer, CEO of IM Global
- Scott Frandsen, Canadian rower, 2003 Oxford Blue and Olympic medallist
- Arihiro Fukuda, associate professor of the University of Tokyo
- Patrick Garland, theatre director (Honorary Fellow)
- David Gauke, Conservative MP for South West Hertfordshire, 2005–2019; Lord High Chancellor of Great Britain, 2018–2019
- Ivan Gazidis, Chief Executive of Arsenal F.C., 2009–2018; Chief Executive of A.C. Milan, 2018–present
- Darren Gerard, cricketer
- Amitav Ghosh, writer
- Matt Golder, political scientist
- Timothy Gorringe, professor of theology
- Sir Richard Gozney, career diplomat; Governor and Commander-in-Chief of Bermuda, 2007–2012; Lieutenant Governor of the Isle of Man, 2016–2021
- Geoffrey Grigson, poet and critic
- Alice Hart-Davis, journalist
- Thomas Hearne, antiquarian and diarist
- Bob Hiller, rugby player for Harlequins, England and the British and Irish Lions
- Robert Sparke Hutchings, clergyman, school founder and Bible translator
- Robert Jackson, Conservative, later Labour, politician MEP for Upper Thames, 1979–1984; MP for Wantage, 1983–2005
- Terry Jones, comedic actor and writer
- Gabriel Josipovici, novelist and playwright
- Emma Kennedy, comic actress and writer
- Salman Khurshid, Indian politician; Minister of External Affairs, 2012–2014
- Stewart Lee, comedian and writer
- John Lewis, antiquarian and diarist, 1701–1704
- Yann Lovelock, writer and interfaith worker
- Rob Macaire, diplomat
- William MacAskill, philosopher
- Ken Macdonald, Baron Macdonald of River Glaven, Warden of Wadham College, Oxford, 2012–2021; Director of Public Prosecutions, 2003–2008
- Hugo MacNeill, Ireland and British Lions rugby player, 1981–1988
- Bongbong Marcos (special diploma recipient), Filipino politician; 17th President of the Philippines, from 2022
- Hugh McManners, author and journalist
- John McManners, ecclesiastical historian
- Jude Cowan Montague, artist, musician, writer
- Derek Morris, economist; provost of Oriel College, Oxford, 2003–2013
- Rudrangshu Mukherjee, Indian historian; chancellor of Ashoka University, from 2017; former opinion editor of The Telegraph, Calcutta
- Al Murray, comedian
- Michael Nazir-Ali, former Bishop of Rochester
- Richard Onslow, 1st Baron Onslow, Whig politician; Speaker of the House of Commons, 1708–1710; Chancellor of the Exchequer, 1714–1715
- Oronhyatekha, Mohawk physician and scholar
- Andrew Peach, BBC Radio 4 presenter
- Nigel Pegram, actor
- Littleton Powys, Justice of the King's Bench, 1701–1726
- Larry Pressler, Chairman of the Senate Committee on Commerce, Science and Transportation, 1995–1997; United States Senator for South Dakota, 1979–1997; Member of the United States House of Representatives for South Dakota's 1st congressional district, 1975–1979
- Nicholas Pumfrey (Lord Justice Pumfrey), Court of Appeal Judge
- Sophy Ridge, television political journalist
- Charles Ritcheson, historian, diplomat and university administrator
- P. G. D. Robbins, England rugby union player, 1956–1962
- Michael Scott Rohan, writer
- Myron Rolle, neurosurgeon and ex-NFL player for the Tennessee Titans, 2010–2011 and Pittsburgh Steelers, 2012
- Edward P.F. Rose, paleontologist and geologist
- General Hugh Michael Rose (Mike Rose), British Army officer and Queen's Gallantry Medal recipient
- Mark Sedwill, diplomat
- M. J. K. Smith, cricketer
- John Spellar, Labour MP for Birmingham Northfield, 1982–1983; MP for Warley West, later Warley, 1992–2024
- John Stainer, composer and organist, 1840-1901
- Sir Keir Starmer, Prime Minister of the United Kingdom since July 2024 and Leader of the Labour Party from 2020; MP for Holborn and St Pancras from 2015; Director of Public Prosecutions, 2008–2013
- Graham Steele, Minister of Finance of Nova Scotia, 2009–2012; Nova Scotia New Democratic Party Member of the Nova Scotia House of Assembly for Halifax Fairview (now Halifax Armdale), 2001–2013
- Mel Stride, Leader of the House of Commons, May–July 2019; Conservative MP for Central Devon, from 2010
- Jenny Taylor, professor of genomic medicine at the University of Oxford
- Nick Thomas-Symonds, Minister for the Cabinet Office, Paymaster General and Minister for the Constitution and European Union Relations from 2024; Labour MP for Torfaen, from 2015
- Ronny Tong, Hong Kong Senior Counsel and politician
- Frank Vandenbroucke, Belgian politician; Minister of Foreign Affairs, 1994–1995; Minister of Health and Social Affairs, from 2020
- Faith Wainwright, one of the first female engineering graduates, structural engineer and Honorary Fellow of St Edmund Hall, Oxford
- Piers Wardle, artist
- John Wells, comic actor and translator
- John West, missionary
- Cat White, actor and activist
- Kristof Willerton, gymnast
- Daniel Wilson, bishop of Calcutta, 1832–1858
- Peter Winch, philosopher
- Terry Wyatt, professor of physics at the University of Manchester
