= Robert McLeod =

Robert McLeod or variants may refer to:

== Sports ==
- Bob McLeod (cricketer) (1868–1907), Australian cricketer
- Bob McLeod (cyclist) (1913–1958), Canadian Olympic cyclist
- Bob McLeod (American football) (1938–2019), American football player
- Bob MacLeod (1917–2003), American football player

== Politics ==
- Robert C. McLeod (Prince Edward Island politician) (1851–1905)
- Robert C. McLeod (Northwest Territories politician) (born 1960), politician in the Northwest Territories, Canada
- Bob McLeod (politician) (born 1952), premier of the Northwest Territories, Canada
- Robert Macleod (Australian politician), mayor of Palmerston, Northern Territory, Australia
- Robert Bruce Aeneas Macleod (1764–1844), British member of parliament

== Other ==
- Robert L. McLeod (1901–1998), American pastor and academic administrator
- Bob McLeod (comics) (born 1951), American comic book artist
- Robert MacLeod (born 1964), British businessman
- Robert MacLeod, pseudonym of Bill Knox, Scottish author
- Rob McLeod (born 1957/58), tax specialist in New Zealand
