= Edward Rose (disambiguation) =

Edward Rose (1849–1904) was an English playwright

Edward Rose may refer to:

- Edward Everett Rose (1862–1939), American playwright
- Edward Rose (cricketer) (born 1936), cricketer for Cambridge University
- Edward P. F. Rose, English palaeontologist and geologist
- Edward Rose (fur trapper) (died 1833)
