= Darwall-Smith =

Darwall-Smith is an English-language surname and may be:

- John Darwall-Smith (1912–1976), an English cricketer.
- Randle Darwall-Smith (1914–1999), an English cricketer.
- Robin Darwall-Smith, an English archivist.

== See also ==
- Darwall
- Smith
