= Allan Buckwell =

British economist (born 1947)

Professor Allan Edgar Buckwell (born 1947) is a British academic and agricultural economist associated with research on the Common Agricultural Policy.

== Early life ==
He is the son of George Buckwell and Jessie Neave, and obtained an MA in economics from the University of Manchester.

== Career ==
From 1970 to 1984 he worked at Newcastle University.

From 1984 to 1999 he was a professor of Agricultural Economics at Wye College.

From 2000 to 2011 he was Policy Director of the Country Land and Business Association.

Since 2012 he has been Senior Research Fellow at the Institute for European Environmental Policy. He researches the Common Agricultural Policy.

== Publications ==
- The Cost of the Common Agricultural Policy, 1982
- Privatisation of Agriculture in New Market Economies: lessons from Bulgaria, 1994
