= Caroline Jackson =

British politician (1946–2025)

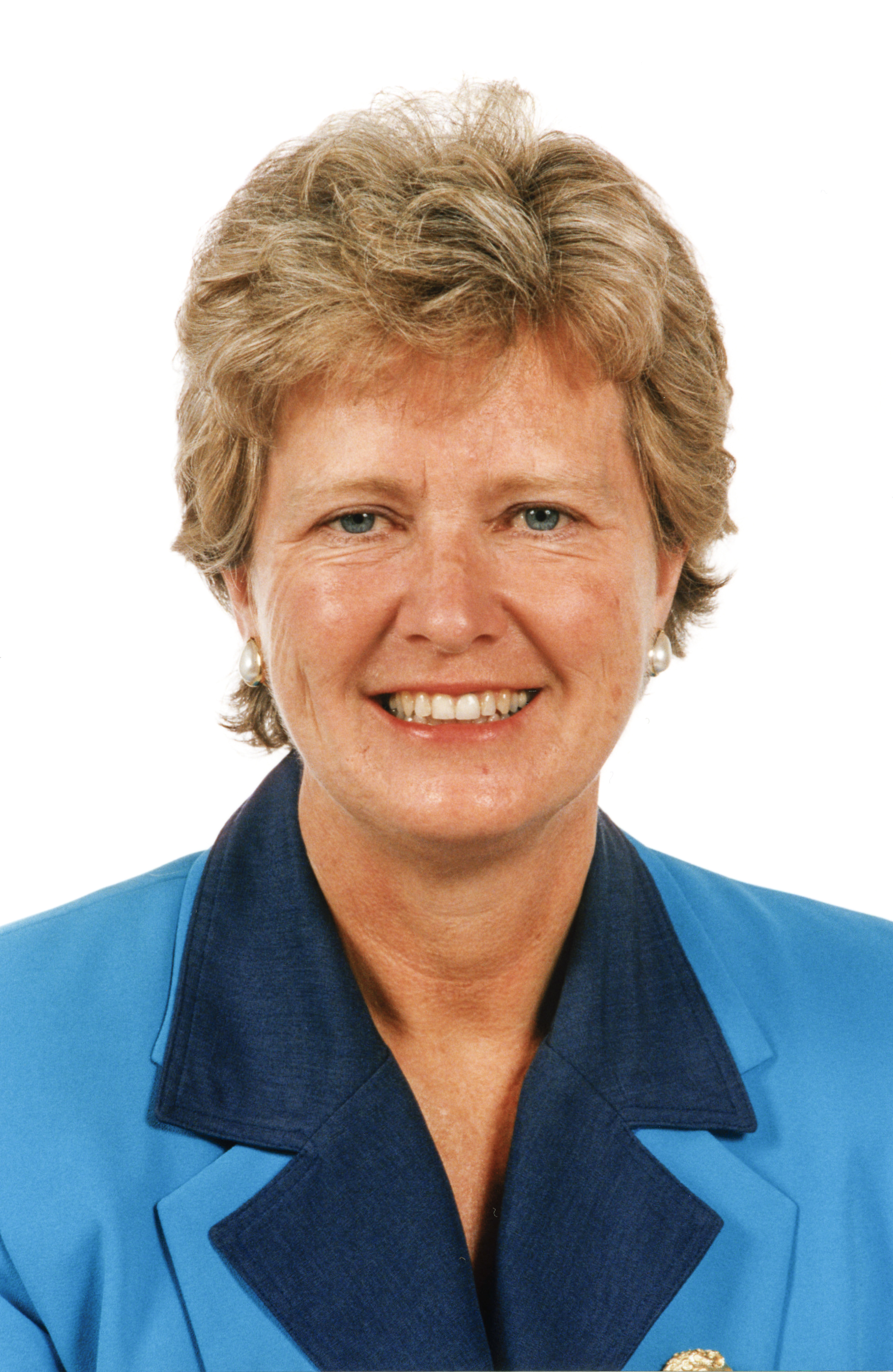
- Jackson in 1994

Member of the European Parliament
- In office 1984 – 14 July 2009
- Preceded by: Constituency established (1984, 1994, 1999)
- Succeeded by: Constituency abolished (1994, 1999)
- Constituency: Wiltshire (1984–1994); Wiltshire North and Bath (1994–1999); South West England (1999–2009)

Personal details
- Born: Caroline Frances Harvey; 5 November 1946 Penzance, Cornwall, England
- Died: 20 October 2025 (aged 78)
- Party: Conservative
- Education: St Hugh's College, Oxford; Nuffield College, Oxford
- Website: www.drcarolinejackson.com

Caroline Frances Jackson (née Harvey; 5 November 1946 – 20 October 2025) was a British Conservative Party politician who was a Member of the European Parliament from 1984 to 2009.

== Early career ==
Caroline Frances Harvey was born in Penzance, Cornwall, on 5 November 1946.

Before she became an MEP, Jackson was a Research Fellow at St Hugh's College, Oxford, where she obtained a doctorate in 19th century political history. She also studied at Nuffield College, Oxford. She worked at the Conservative Research Department from 1973 to 1974 and fought the constituency of Birmingham Erdington in the February 1974 general election. She then became a member of the research team supporting the first British Conservative MEPs from 1974 to 1984.

== Member of the European Parliament ==
Jackson was elected to represent the Wiltshire constituency from 1984 to 1994, then the new Wiltshire North and Bath constituency from 1994 to 1999 and from 1999 to 2009 served as an MEP for the South West England constituency.

In the European Parliament, she was a leading member of the Environment Committee and between 1999 and 2004 was chairman of the Committee on the Environment, Consumer Protection and Public Health. During her chairmanship she tried to focus attention as much on Member States' performance in transposing and applying new EU laws as on the adoption of more such laws. This was during a period of intense legislation in the area of water and air pollution, waste disposal and controls on chemicals. Jackson controlled the committee firmly but with humour – qualities very necessary when German opponents of new laws on alternative medicines attempted to control proceedings in 1995. On 11 September 2001, Jackson's committee was the only one that did not adjourn when the news of the attacks on New York came through: Jackson argued that abrupt abandonment of the committee's work would have been another small victory for the terrorists. Jackson was described by Liberal Democrat MEP Chris Davies thus: "She's been here forever: a bit 'jolly hockey sticks' but firm, fair and funny."

She specialised, as parliamentary rapporteur, on waste legislation. Jackson took the Landfill Directive through the Parliament in 1997–8. In 2008 she was rapporteur on the Waste Framework Directive. Initially criticised as being too close to the waste industry lobby, Jackson united most of her previous opponents in support of an ambitious final text which the Council of Ministers only agreed with reluctance. This placed an obligation on Member States to achieve recycling rates of 50% by 2020, created for the commission the possibility of putting in place waste reduction targets and cleared up the question of the status of incineration of waste as a form of "recovery" rather than "disposal".

Jackson believed that David Cameron was wrong to direct the Conservative MEPs to leave the European People's Party in 2009 because this meant a huge loss of political influence. She pointed out that the Conservatives had enjoyed a high level of political independence within the EPP. She argued that the Conservatives' new position from 2009 in the "Conservatives and European Reformists group" with the Czech ODS party, the Polish Law and Justice party and other European rightists, would mean that they would lose influence and visibility in the European Parliament at the moment when the Parliament's powers were increasing. She made her views known in press articles in 2009 and Cameron feared that she might follow her husband, Robert V. Jackson, MP for Wantage (1983–2005) in abandoning the Conservative party for the Labour Party. But she remained a Conservative and the party paid tribute to her work when she left the Parliament, William Hague pointing out that Jackson was "always ahead of the curve".

She retired at the 2009 European Parliament Elections.

== Later career and death ==
Jackson later worked as an environmental consultant. She was a member of the Foresight Advisory Council of GDF Suez Environment and a board member of the Institute for European Environmental Policy.

Jackson died from complications of Parkinson's disease on 20 October 2025, at the age of 78.

== Publications ==
- Jackson, Caroline (9 December 1988). Report drawn up on behalf of the Committee on the Environment, Public Health and Consumer Protection on the harmonisation of legislation within the European Community on the manufacture, sale and use of the leghold trap. Session Documents 1988-89, Document A2-0303/88. EU European Parliament Document. Pdf.
- Jackson, Caroline (July 1993). "The first British MEPs: styles and strategies". Contemporary European History. 2 (2). Cambridge Journals: 169–195. doi:10.1017/S0960777300000412. JSTOR 20081477.
- Jackson, Caroline (2002). Young person's guide to Europe (2nd ed.). London: Conservatives in the European Parliament. OCLC 912757486.
- Jackson, Caroline (1998). The end of the throwaway society?.
- Jackson, Caroline (2006). Britain's waste: the lessons we can learn from Europe (PDF). Conservative MEPs.
- Jackson, Caroline; Watkins, E. (2012). EU waste law: the challenge of better compliance (PDF). Institute for European Environmental Policy. Archived from the original (PDF) on 20 October 2016.
