= Wiltshire (European Parliament constituency) =

Former European Parliament constituency

- European Parliament constituency
- Boundary within South West England (1984-1994)
- Member state: United Kingdom
- Created: 1984
- Dissolved: 1994
- MEPs: 1

Prior to its uniform adoption of proportional representation in 1999, the United Kingdom used first-past-the-post for the European elections in England, Scotland and Wales. The European Parliament constituencies used under that system were smaller than the later regional constituencies and only had one Member of the European Parliament each. The constituency of Wiltshire was one of them.

The constituency consisted of the Westminster Parliament constituencies of Devizes, Newbury, North Wiltshire, Salisbury, Swindon, Wantage, Westbury.

The constituency was represented for the whole of its existence by Caroline Jackson. At the 1994 European election, there were boundary changes. Most of Wiltshire then became part of the new Wiltshire North and Bath constituency, which again elected Caroline Jackson.

== Members of the European Parliament ==
Elected	Name	Party
1984	Caroline Jackson	Conservative
1994	Constituency abolished	

== Election results ==
European Parliament election, 1984: Wiltshire
Party	Candidate	Votes	%	±%
Conservative	Caroline Jackson	86,873	47.5	
Alliance	Jack Ainslie	60,404	33.1	
Labour	Paul Whiteside	35,457	19.4	
Majority		26,469	14.4	
Turnout		182,734		
Conservative win (new seat)				

European Parliament election, 1989: Wiltshire
Party	Candidate	Votes	%	±%
Conservative	Caroline Jackson	93,200	44.4	−3.1
Labour	Geoff A. Harris	46,887	22.3	+2.9
Green	J. V. (Bill) Hughes	46,735	22.3	New
SLD	Paul N. Crossley	18,302	8.7	−24.4
Independent	J.A. Cade	4,809	2.3	New
Majority		46,313	22.1	+7.7
Turnout		209,933		
Conservative hold		Swing		

== See also ==
- Wiltshire North and Bath (European Parliament constituency)
