= 2008 Progressive Conservative Party of New Brunswick leadership election =

- Date: October 18, 2008
- Convention: Fredericton, New Brunswick
- Resigning leader: Bernard Lord
- Won by: David Alward
- Ballots: 1
- Candidates: 2

The Progressive Conservative Party of New Brunswick held a leadership election in 2008, following the resignation of Bernard Lord on December 13, 2006. The Conservatives had last had a leadership election in 1997.

The leadership convention occurred on Saturday, October 18, 2008. The main convention site was at the Aitken University Centre on the UNB Fredericton campus in Fredericton, NB. The party also operated satellite convention sites around the province. The event also saw a tribute to former Premier Bernard Lord on the evening preceding the election.

The PC Party is a fiscally conservative and otherwise moderate political party in the province of New Brunswick, Canada. It is, with the New Brunswick Liberal Association, one of two parties that contend for power in the province and most recently controlled the government from winning the 1999 election until losing the 2006 election.

On January 5, 2007, it was reported that interim leader Jeannot Volpé would not allow the contest to begin until after the first session of the 56th New Brunswick Legislative Assembly closed that June, making it unlikely for the leadership to be decided before late 2007 or possibly into 2008. In fact, the leadership race did not begin in earnest until the end of the second session when David Alward declared his candidacy on June 19, 2008.

At the party's annual general meeting in Fredericton on October 20, 2007, it was announced that the convention would be held in the fall of 2008, on February 11, 2008, it was announced that the vote would take place on October 18, 2008 - exactly 11 years after the previous leadership election for the party. The voting will take place primarily at a convention at the Aitken University Centre in Fredericton, but there will be satellite conventions in Moncton, Saint John, St. Leonard and Bois-Blanc (near Paquetville) as well as polling stations on Grand Manan, Deer Island and Campobello Island.

== Candidates ==
- David Alward, MLA since 1999, in cabinet 2003–2006. Announced his candidacy on June 19, 2008.

Caucus supporters (10 + himself): Jody Carr, Paul Robichaud, Tony Huntjens, Dale Graham, Trevor Holder, Percy Mockler, Rose-May Poirier, Claude Landry, Carl Urquhart

Member of Parliament Supporters (1): Mike Allen

- Robert MacLeod, former president of party (2007–2008) and son of former interim leader Malcolm MacLeod. Announced his candidacy on July 28, 2008.

Caucus supporters (7): John Betts, Bruce Fitch, Bev Harrison, Kirk MacDonald, Bruce Northrup, Wayne Steeves, Claude Williams

Member of Parliament Supporters (1): Rob Moore

=== Withdrawn ===
- Bruce Fitch, MLA since 2003, in cabinet 2003–2006. Announced his candidacy on July 14, 2008. Fitch withdrew on September 22 and endorsed MacLeod.

=== Non candidates ===
The following individuals were subject of media attention as possible leadership candidates but did not run:

- Keith Ashfield, MLA since 1999, in cabinet 2003–2006. Mentioned as a "less likely" potential candidate from caucus, but has since decided to seek the nomination to be the Conservative Party of Canada candidate for Fredericton in the next federal election.
- Margaret-Ann Blaney, former leadership candidate in 1997, MLA since 1999, in cabinet 1999–2006. Promoted as a potential candidate by former party president Lisa Keenan but stated she would not be a candidate in November 2007. She is serving as neutral co-chair of the election.
- Jody Carr, MLA since 1999, in cabinet 2006. When Lord resigned, CBC News reported that he was the only potential candidate indicating a serious look at a Leadership bid and said he would discuss the possibility with his wife. He was mentioned again as a potential candidate after the PC annual meeting in late October 2007. However, he was announced as David Alward's leadership campaign manager on June 19, 2008.
- Madeleine Dubé, MLA since 1999, in cabinet 2003–2006. Mentioned as a "less likely" potential candidate from caucus, however she has since become de facto deputy leader of the opposition and is often referred to by her Liberal opponents as seeking the job and using her higher profile in caucus to improve her chances over her colleagues. She was mentioned again as a potential candidate after the PC annual meeting in late October 2007. Dubé was not a candidate and remained neutral in the race in her role as caucus chair.
- Brad Green, MLA from 1998 to 2006, in cabinet 1999–2006. Appointed as a non-partisan justice of the Court of Queen's Bench.
- Robert Hatheway, a Fredericton businessman and orthodontist was mentioned as a potential candidate after the PC annual meeting in late October 2007, was reported in June 2008 to be "actively touring the province, assessing the depth of support for his potential candidacy," and launched a website to explore the possibility on July 30, 2008. However, on August 15, 2008, he announced he would not be a candidate. Following his decision not to run Hatheway publicly endorsed David Alward's Leadership bid.
- Trevor Holder, MLA since 1999, in cabinet 2005–2006. When Lord resigned, CBC News reported that Holder's candidacy was being promoted by former party president Lisa Keenan and was supported by the PC riding president in Fundy-River Valley. However, he endorsed David Alward on the day that the latter entered the race.
- Bernard Lord, MLA from 1998 to 2007, premier from 1999 to 2006. The leadership race is being held to choose Lord's successor, however "party members discussed the possibility" of Lord returning at their October 2007 general meeting, indeed "(former) Conservative cabinet minister Omer Leger (said) the possibility shouldn't be counted out". Lord however indicated that a run in this leadership contest "not in the cards".
- Kirk MacDonald, MLA since 1999, in cabinet 2006. He was mentioned again as a potential candidate after the PC annual meeting in late October 2007. He endorsed Robert MacLeod for leader.
- Lisa Merrithew, deputy chief of staff to Bernard Lord (2006) and daughter of former provincial and federal cabinet minister Gerald Merrithew. Merrithew, who is fluently bilingual and was brought in to improve the communications of Premier Bernard Lord's government did oversee the PC Party retaking the lead in opinion polls for the first time in three years and they went on to win the popular vote and narrowly lose the election. Merrithew works at Fleishman-Hillard. She was mentioned again as potential a candidate after the PC annual meeting in late October 2007. However, she endorsed MacLeod on the day that the latter entered the race.
- Percy Mockler, MLA from 1982 to 1987 and again since 1994, in cabinet 1999–2006. Mentioned as a "less likely" candidate from caucus. He joined David Alward for his campaign announcement and, though he did not endorse Alward, indicated he would not be a candidate.
- Elvy Robichaud, MLA from 1994 to 2006, in cabinet 1999–2006. He is serving as neutral co-chair of the election.
- Paul Robichaud, though cited as a potential bilingual caucus contender in some sources, the Telegraph-Journal reported that he was the first caucus member to rule out a run. Despite his initial indication he would not run, on July 2, 2008, it was reported that Robichaud said his inclination to be a candidate was "more yes than no". However, on August 18, 2008, he announced he would not be a candidate. On September 4, 2008, Robichaud announced that he would be supporting David Alward.
- John Thompson, CEO of Enterprise Greater Moncton. Reported in July 2008 to be "mulling things over" about a potential run. Thompson did not enter the race.
- Jeannot Volpé was elected as interim leader on December 19, 2006, and indicated he will not seek the leadership on a permanent basis.
- Claude Williams, MLA since 2001, in cabinet 2006. Mentioned as a "less likely" potential candidate from caucus, however he was mentioned again as a potential candidate after the PC annual meeting in late October 2007. However, he endorsed MacLeod on the day that the latter entered the race.

== Results ==
2008 PCNB Leadership Convention
Candidate	Votes	%
David Alward	2,269	56.3
Robert MacLeod	1,760	43.7

== Timeline ==
- September 18, 2006 – The Progressive Conservatives fail in their bid to win a third term in government despite winning the popular vote in a close election.
- December 12, 2006 – An opinion poll released by Corporate Research Associates show that the PCs now trail the Liberals by a margin of 65% to 27% while Lord trails Premier Shawn Graham 48% to 23% in leadership preferences.
- December 13, 2006 – Lord announces his resignation as leader and his Moncton East seat in the legislature both effective January 31, 2007.
- December 19, 2006 – The party selects Jeannot Volpé as interim leader until the convention, he will assume this role upon Lord's formal leaving of office in January.
- October 20, 2007 – The party announces that it will hold a leadership race in the fall of 2008.
- February 11, 2008 – The party announces the election will be held on October 18, 2008.
- June 19, 2008 – David Alward declares his candidacy.
- July 2, 2008 – Campaign co-chairs announce rules for the process including a $10,000 entrance fee, $300,000 spending limit and a requirement to publicly disclosure donations of more than $6000.
- July 14, 2008 – Bruce Fitch declares his candidacy.
- July 28, 2008 – Robert MacLeod declares his candidacy.
- August 21, 2008 – The PC Party announces that the theme of the convention will be "It's A Matter of Trust" and that there will be five "all candidate meetings" in September.
- September 22, 2008 – Fitch withdraws from the race, endorses MacLeod.
- October 18, 2008 – Alward wins the leadership with 56% of the vote.
