= Reg Turner =

Reg, Reggie or Reginald Turner may refer to:

== People ==
- Reginald Turner (1869–1938), English author, aesthete and member of Oscar Wilde's circle
- Reg Turner (actor), English performer in 1971's Farm Fresh Food (The Goodies)
- Reg Turner (politician), leader of the New Zealand Representative Party in 2008
- Reggie Turner (musician), American composer on 1992's Free (The Party album)
- Reggie Turner (basketball) (born 1966), American forward in 1989 NBA draft
- Reggie Turner (filmmaker), American documentary director (2008's Before They Die! on the Tulsa race massacre)
- Reginald Reader 'Reggie' Turner, Sussex rugby player and president of rugby club (List of Old Emanuels#Rugby)

== Fictional characters ==
- Reg Turner, foreman and pattern cutter in 1961–63 British sitcom The Rag Trade
- Reg Turner, businessman in British mercantile drama The Brothers (1972 TV series)#Series 2
