= Camkin =

Camkin is a surname. Notable people with the surname include:

- Bill Camkin (1894–1956), English billiard hall owner, father of John
- John Camkin (1922–1998), English journalist and sports administrator
