= Leonard Summers =

English cricketer (1904–1977)

Personal information
- Full name: Leonard Shelton Heath Summers
- Born: 25 June 1904; Fulham, London, England
- Died: 26 February 1977 (aged 72); Barnes, Surrey, England
- Batting: Unknown
- Bowling: Leg break

Domestic team information
- Years: Team
- 1933: Minor Counties

Career statistics
Competition	First-class
Matches	2
Runs scored	103
Batting average	25.75
100s/50s	–/1
Top score	57
Balls bowled	450
Wickets	4
Bowling average	38.50
5 wickets in innings	–
10 wickets in match	–
Best bowling	3/99
Catches/stumpings	1/–
- Source: Cricinfo, 12 August 2012

Leonard Shelton Heath Summers (25 June 1904 – 26 February 1977) was an English cricketer. Summers' batting style is unknown, though it is known he bowled leg break. He was born at Fulham, London, and was educated at Emanuel School. Summers made his debut for the Surrey Second XI against Wiltshire in the 1925 Minor Counties Championship. He played for the Surrey Second XI until 1933, making 32 appearances. In addition to playing for the Surrey Second XI, Summers made his debut in first-class cricket for HDG Leveson-Gower's XI against Cambridge University at The Saffrons, Eastbourne. HDG Leveson-Gower's XI won the toss and elected to bat first, making 215 all out, during which Summers opened the batting and scored 26 runs before he was dismissed by Arthur Hazlerigg. Cambridge University then responded in their first-innings by making 411/7 declared, an innings in which Summers took figures of 3/99 from 41 overs. Responding in their second-innings, HDG Leveson-Gower's XI made 282 all out, with Summers batting at number four on this occasion, scoring 57 runs before he was dismissed by John Human. Cambridge University won the match by 6 wickets. Playing minor counties cricket for the Surrey Second XI allowed him to be selected to play for a combined Minor Counties cricket team, making a single first-class appearance for the team against Oxford University at the University Parks in 1933. The Minor Counties won the toss and elected to bat first, making 379/9 declared, with Summers being dismissed for 20 runs by Edwin Barlow. Oxford University then made 248 all out in their first-innings, with Summers taking the wicket of John Darwall-Smith to finish with figures of 1/40 from 26 overs. The Minor Counties then made 212/4 declared in their second-innings, with Summers being dismissed for a duck by Antony Legard. Set a target of 344 for victory, Oxford University could only manage to make 185 all out, handing victory by 158 runs to the Minor Counties.

Summers played much of his club cricket for Dulwich surpassing 1,000 runs in a season eight times and 100 wickets on six occasions. E. W. Swanton wrote of him: "I can scarcely think of a better cricketer who was not seen in county cricket."

Summers died at Barnes, Surrey, on 26 February 1977.
