= J. A. Cuddon =

English author, teacher, and literary historian (1928-1996)

- Born: John Anthony Bowden Cuddon; 2 June 1928; United Kingdom
- Died: 12 March 1996 (aged 67); United Kingdom
- Citizenship: United Kingdom
- Occupation: Author
- Writing career
- Language: English
- Genres: Fiction, non-fiction, dictionary

John Anthony Bowden Cuddon (2 June 1928 – 12 March 1996), was an English author, dictionary writer, and school teacher. He is known best for his Dictionary of Literary Terms (published in several editions), described by the Times Educational Supplement as ‘scholarly, succinct, comprehensive and entertaining…an indispensable work of reference.’ Cuddon also wrote The Macmillan Dictionary of Sport and Games, a two million-word account of most of the world's sports and games through history, as well as several novels, plays, travel books, and other published works. Cuddon's The Owl's Watchsong was a study of Istanbul.

Cuddon also edited two important anthologies of supernatural fiction – The Penguin Book of Ghost Stories and The Penguin Book of Horror Stories (both 1984).

In his distinguished teaching career at Emanuel School in London, England, he taught English. He also coached rugby and cricket.

== Bibliography ==
Novels

A Multitude of Sins (1961)

Testament of Iscariot (1962)

The Acts of Darkness (1963)

The Six Wounds (1964)

The Bride of Battersea (1967)

Non-fiction

The Owl's Watchsong (1960)

The Companion Guide to Yugoslavia (1974)

A Dictionary of Literary Terms (1977)

The Macmillan Dictionary of Sport and Games (1980)

The Penguin Book of Ghost Stories (1984) (editor)

The Penguin Book of Horror Stories (1984) (editor)
