= Fedele De Giorgis =

Italian general

Fedele De Giorgis (17 January 1887 – 4 February 1964) was an Italian general of the Kingdom of Italy. He was born in Chivasso, Province of Turin, Piedmont. He was a veteran of World War I.

From 1938 to 1940, he obtained the command of the 3rd Alpine Division "Julia" stationed in Albania. He was promoted to major general on 1 January 1940 and became commander of the 55th Infantry Division "Savona" during World War II. He was also head of the delegation of the Italian armistice commission with France in Syria.

It was during this period that he proposed the idea of the Italian foreign legion, an idea that was welcomed by the Italian general staff, which gathered in it all the anti-allied volunteers willing to fight with the Axis countries. On 17 January 1942, he was captured by the British at the end of the siege of Halfaya Pass, during Operation Crusader.

From 16 May 1947 until 24 May 1950 was the commander in chief of the 'Arma dei Carabinieri'. He supported the foundation of ONAOMAC (National Opera Military Assistance Orphans Arma Carabinieri).

He was a recipient of the Silver Medal of Military Valor and the Bronze Medal of Military Valor. He was one of the nine Italian recipients of the Knight's Cross of the Iron Cross, receiving his award from Nazi Germany on 9 January 1942.

He died in Rome.
