= Darwall =

Darwall is a surname. Notable people with the surname include:

- Alexander Darwall (born 1963), British landowner and investment fund manager
- John Darwall (1731–1789), English Anglican clergyman and hymnodist
- Stephen Darwall (born 1946), American philosopher

== See also ==
- Darwall-Smith
