= Bill Boorne =

English theatre critic and journalist (1899–1974)

Bill Boorne (1899–1974) was an English theatre critic and journalist who wrote a column for London's Evening News and its successor, the Evening Standard.

Boorne was educated at Emanuel School, London, England.

He retired from the Evening Standard in 1967: he had worked for the paper for 30 years, including 20 years as the show business correspondent.

He appeared as a castaway on the BBC Radio programme Desert Island Discs on 19 February 1968.

Boorne was associated with the Northcliffe Golfing Society.

He died at Haywards Heath in 1974 aged 75.
