= Bruce Neale =

England international rugby union player

- Full name: Bruce Alan Neale
- Born: 15 September 1923 Chelsea, England
- Died: 28 January 1996 (aged 72) Ipswich, England
- School: Emanuel School

Rugby union career
- Position: Lock
International career
Years	Team	Apps	(Points)
1951	England	3	(0)

Bruce Alan Neale (15 September 1923 – 28 January 1996) was an English international rugby union player.

Neale was born in Chelsea and educated at Emanuel School.

A Rosslyn Park player, Neale was a late addition to the final England trial prior to the 1951 Five Nations and won a place in the tournament opener against Wales. He didn't get to play Wales after breaking his nose in an Army match, but featured in the remaining three fixtures, utilised as a lock.

== See also ==
- List of England national rugby union players
