= Neil Carson (businessman) =

British businessman

Neil Carson OBE
- Born: Neil Andrew Patrick Carson; 15 April 1957 (age 69)
- Education: Emanuel School; Coventry University
- Occupation: Businessman
- Years active: 1980–present
- Title: former CEO, Johnson Matthey
- Term: 2004–2014
- Predecessor: Michael Dearden
- Successor: Robert MacLeod
- Board member of: AMEC plc

Neil Andrew Patrick Carson OBE (born 15 April 1957) is a British businessman, who was the chief executive (CEO) of Johnson Matthey, a British multinational chemicals and precious metals company, from 2004 to 2014.

== Early life ==
Carson grew up in south London and attended Emanuel School. He has an engineering degree from Coventry University.

== Career ==
Carson joined Johnson Matthey in 1980, and was appointed to the board of in 2002, and promoted to CEO in 2004. Since 2010, Carson has been a non-executive director of AMEC plc.

Carson retired in 2014, and was succeeded as CEO of Johnson Matthey by Robert MacLeod.

Carson is a member of the advisory board for the Cambridge Programme for Sustainability Leadership. Carson has also served as the chairman of UK government's sustainable consumption and production taskforce.

== Honours and awards ==
In 2010, he was awarded an honorary doctorate by Anglia Ruskin University.

Carson was appointed Officer of the Order of the British Empire (OBE) in the 2016 Birthday Honours for services to the chemical industry.
