= Peter Betts (civil servant) =

British civil servant (1959–2023)

- Born: 1959
- Died: 2023 (aged 63–64)
- Occupation: civil servant

Peter Betts CB (3 March 1959 – 21 October 2023) was a British civil servant and climate negotiator. In 2015 he helped draft the Paris Agreement, acting as chief negotiator for the European Union.

== Early life and education ==
Born in Battersea, London, to George Betts, a member of the fire brigade salvage corps, and Joyce Pedder, a welfare worker, he attended Emanuel School and Mansfield College, Oxford, where he studied history.

== Career ==
After graduating in 1982, Betts undertook various jobs, including with the East End News, before joining the civil service in 1984. His career progressed rapidly in the Department of the Environment, leading to a three-year assignment in Brussels from 1994 to 1997.

In 2008 Betts transitioned to focus on climate change, becoming the Director of International Climate Change at Department for Environment, Food and Rural Affairs. Subsequent departmental reorganisations saw climate change responsibilities shift to the Department of Energy and Climate Change and later to the Department for Business, Energy and Industrial Strategy.

During his tenure, Betts played a major role in the Paris Agreement negotiations, addressing complex issues such as precise wording and legal interpretations, which were critical to the agreement's success. After his civil service career, Betts took up advisory and academic roles, including a position at Chatham House.

His autobiography, The Climate Diplomat: A Personal History of the COP Conferences, was published posthumously in 2025. The book was praised, with Fiona Harvey writing in The Guardian: “Part memoir and part penetrating analysis, with lessons for the future as well as revelations from the past, in some of its best passages this book reads like a briskly paced thriller.”

== Personal life ==
In 2006 Betts married Fiona MacGregor, now a chief executive at the Regulator of Social Housing. They had no children.

He died of a brain tumour on 21 October 2023, aged 64.

== Awards and recognition ==
- Companion of the Order of the Bath
