= John Cole (British Army cricketer) =

English cricketer and British Army officer (1907–1997)

Personal information
- Full name: John Richard Cole
- Born: 15 February 1907; Clapham, Surrey, England
- Died: September 1997 (aged 90); Reading, Berkshire, England
- Batting: Right-handed

Career statistics
Competition	First-class
Matches	4
Runs scored	112
Batting average	14.00
100s/50s	–/1
Top score	63
Catches/stumpings	5/–
- Source: Cricinfo, 14 April 2019

Colonel John Richard Cole (15 February 1907 – September 1997) was an English first-class cricketer and British Army officer. His military career spanned from 1927–1959 with the Loyal Regiment, during which he served in the Second World War. He also played first-class cricket for the British Army cricket team.

== Life and military career ==
Cole was born at Clapham and was educated at Emanuel School. From there he attended the Royal Military College, Sandhurst. He graduated from Sandhurst in September 1927, entering into the Loyal Regiment as a second lieutenant. He was promoted to the rank of lieutenant in September 1930. He made his debut in first-class cricket for the British Army cricket team against the Marylebone Cricket Club (MCC) at Lord's in 1930. He made two further first-class appearances for the Army in 1931, against Oxford University and the MCC, before making a final appearance in 1932 against the touring South Americans at Aldershot. He scored a total of 112 runs in his four first-class matches, with a high score of 63 against the South Americans.

He was seconded for service with the Colonial Office in June 1933, before promotion to the rank of captain in September 1937. In June 1938, he was appointed to be a deputy assistant provost marshal at Shanghai. Cole served during the Second World War and was mentioned in dispatches in recognition of gallant and distinguished service in the Malayan campaign. He was promoted to the rank of lieutenant colonel in October 1949. He was promoted to the rank of major in October 1944. He was promoted to the rank of colonel in January 1954. He retired from active service in December 1959.

He died at Reading in September 1997, at the age of 90.
