= 55th Infantry Division "Savona" =

Infantry division of the Royal Italian Army during World War II

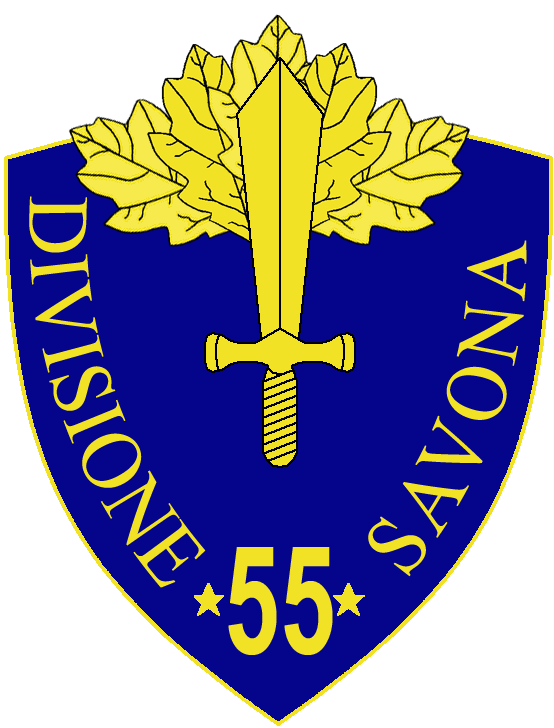
- 55th Infantry Division "Savona" insignia
- Active: 27 April 1939 – 17 January 1942
- Country: Kingdom of Italy
- Branch: Royal Italian Army
- Type: Infantry
- Size: Division
- Garrison/HQ: Salerno
- Engagements: World War II: Operation Crusader; Siege of Tobruk

Commanders
- Current commander: Generale di Divisione Fedele de Giorgis (Note: Author Walther-Peer Fellgiebel lists Fedele de Giorgis as a recipient of the Knight's Cross of the Iron Cross on 9 January 1942 as Lieutenant General and commander of the Italian Division "Savona". According to Veit Scherzer his name is spelled Fedele Degiorgis.)
- Notable commanders: Generale di Divisione Fedele de Giorgis

Insignia
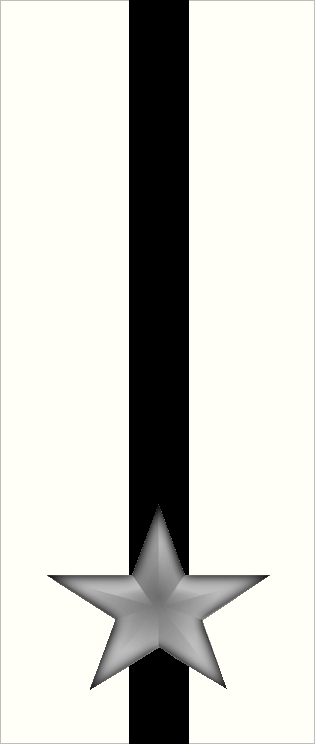
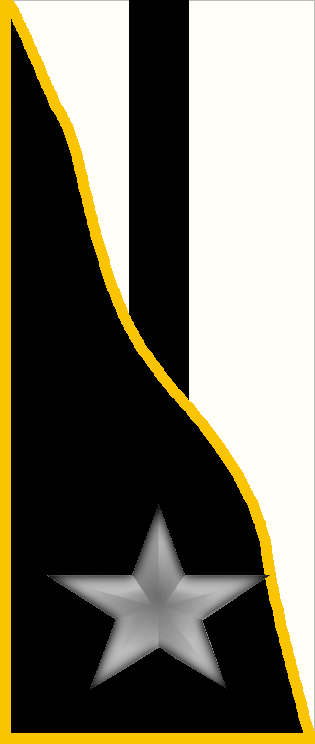
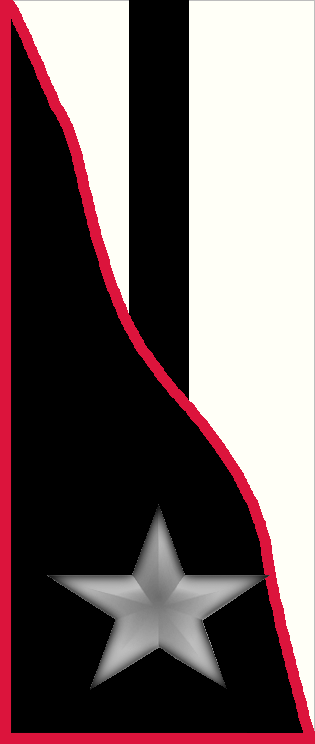
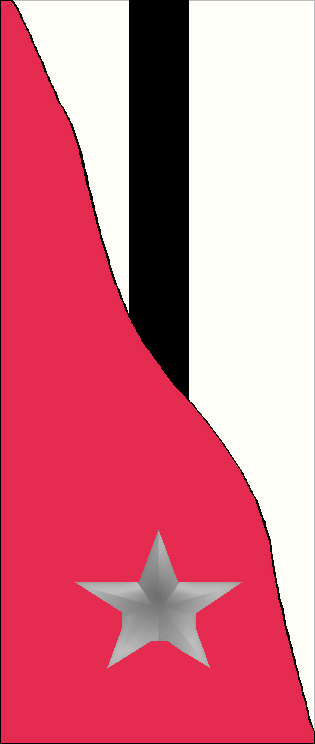
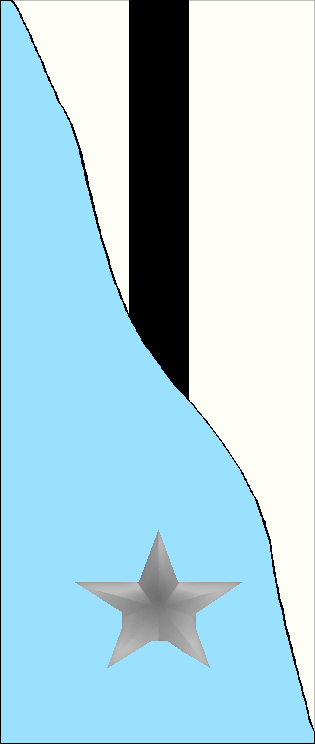
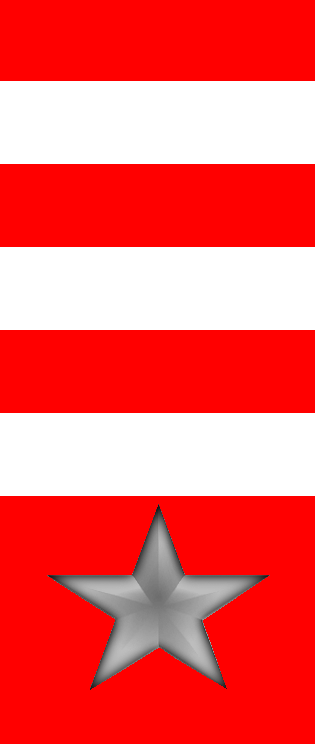
- Identification symbol: Savona Division gorget patches

The 55th Infantry Division "Savona" (Italian: 55ª Divisione di fanteria "Savona") was an infantry division of the Royal Italian Army during World War II. It was formed on 27 April 1939 in Salerno and named after the city of Savona. Its men were drafted from Naples, Salerno and the surrounding Campania. The Savona was classified as an auto-transportable division, meaning it had some motorized transport, but not enough to move the entire division at once. The division was destroyed during Operation Crusader at Halfaya Pass and officially declared lost on 17 January 1942.

== History ==
The division's lineage begins with the Brigade "Savona" established on 21 December 1821, which on 25 October 1831 split to form the 1st and 2nd infantry regiments under the brigade's command. On 4 May 1839 the two regiments were re-numbered as 15th and 16th infantry regiments.

=== World War I ===
The brigade fought on the Italian front in World War I. On 4 November 1926 the brigade was disbanded and its regiments transferred to other brigades: the 15th Infantry Regiment "Savona" to the XXV Infantry Brigade and the 16th Infantry Regiment "Savona" to the XXVII Infantry Brigade. On 27 April 1939 the 55th Infantry Division "Savona" was activated in Salerno and the 15th and 16th infantry regiments returned to the division, which was completed by the addition of the 12th Artillery Regiment.

=== World War II ===
After the outbreak of World War II the Savona was sent to Libya and was garrisoned in ʽAziziya south-west of Tripoli from September 1939. During the Italian invasion of France from 10-25 June 1940 the Savona was deployed along the French Tunisian-Libyan border. After the signing of the Franco-Italian Armistice signed on 24 June 1940 the Savona returned to its garrison in Gharyan near Tripoli.

The division did not participate in the 1940 Italian invasion of Egypt and remained in its garrison until June 1941. That month the division arrived at the Siege of Tobruk. In August 1941 the division took up positions at Sollum-Bardia-Halfaya Pass. By November 1941, the Savona manned defensive positions at Bardia and Sīdī ‘Umar, where it engaged in combat with units of the British Eighth Army.

On 18 November 1941 the British commenced Operation Crusader and attacked from Bi’r Qirbah to Halfaya. On 22 and 23 November nearly 1,500 troops of the Savona surrendered to British forces and two of the division's positions were lost. The Savona counter-attacked and regained one of its two lost positions.

On 4 December 1941, as the Afrika Korps prepared to retreat to the Gazala Line, the Savona was ordered to cover the Axis withdrawal by tying up Commonwealth forces on the Sollum-Bardia-Halfaya line for as long as possible. During December 1941 the Savona's supply situation deteriorated, with food, water and ammunition becoming scarce. Bardia was lost 2 January 1942 and the Savona was encircled.

Due to the lack of food and water and the impossibility to continue supplying the division by air the Italian Comando Supremo allowed the remnants of the Savona division in Sollum, Halfaya and Cirene to surrender. The division was officially declared lost on 17 January 1942.

== Organization ==
55th Infantry Division "Savona" organization in 1940

- 55th Infantry Division "Savona", in Salerno
  - Headquarters
    - Command Company
    - 72nd Carabinieri Section
    - 127th Carabinieri Section
    - 55th Field Post Office
    - 55th Infantry Division Command Transport Squad
  - 15th Infantry Regiment "Savona", in Caserta (switched base with the 39th Infantry Regiment "Bologna" in Salerno in April 1939)
    - Command Company
    - 3 × Fusilier battalions
    - Support Weapons Battery (65/17 mod. 13 infantry support guns)
    - Mortar Company (81mm mod. 35 mortars)
  - 16th Infantry Regiment "Savona", in Cosenza
    - Command Company
    - 3 × Fusilier battalions
    - Support Weapons Battery (65/17 mod. 13 infantry support guns)
    - Mortar Company (81mm mod. 35 mortars)
  - 12th Artillery Regiment "Savona", in Capua
    - Command Unit
    - I Group (100/17 mod. 14 howitzers)
    - II Group (75/27 mod. 06 field guns)
    - III Group (75/27 mod. 06 field guns)
    - 13th Anti-aircraft Battery (20/65 mod. 35 anti-aircraft guns)
    - Ammunition and Supply Unit
  - 12th Artillery Regiment "Savona" (after being reorganized in Libya in March 1941)
    - Command Unit
    - I Group (100/17 mod. 14 howitzers)
    - II Group (105/28 cannons)
    - 1 × Battery (75/27 mod. 06 field guns)
    - 2 × Batteries (65/17 mod. 13 mountain guns)
    - 13th Anti-aircraft Battery (20/65 mod. 35 anti-aircraft guns)
    - Ammunition and Supply Unit
  - VIII Machine Gun Battalion (replaced by the CLV Machine Gun Battalion in spring 1941)
  - LV Mixed Engineer Battalion
    - 55th Telegraph and Radio Operators Company
    - 1 × Engineer Company
    - 1 × Searchlight Section
  - LV Replacements Battalion
  - 55th Anti-tank Company (47/32 mod. 35 anti-tank guns)
  - 55th Medical Section
    - 2 × Field hospitals
    - 1 × Surgical unit
  - 55th Supply Section
  - 155th Transport Section

Attached to the division in November 1941:

- IV Machine Gun Squadrons Group, Regiment "Genova Cavalleria"
- Battaillonstab z.b.V. 300 "Oase" (German staff unit coordinating the Afrika Korps' oasis guard and water foraging units)

== Commanding officers ==
The division's commanding officers were:

- Generale di Divisione Pietro Maggiani (1 September 1939 - 3 November 1941)
- Generale di Divisione Fedele De Giorgis (4 November 1941 - 17 January 1942, POW)
