= Edward P. F. Rose =

English palaeontologist and geologist

Edward P.F. Rose
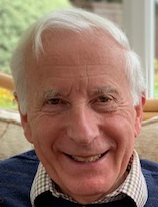
- Born: London
- Education: University of Oxford
- Occupations: Honorary research fellow, dept of earth sciences
- Employer: Royal Holloway, University of London
- Known for: Historian of military aspects of geology
- Awards: Sue Tyler Friedman Medal
- Military career
- Allegiance: United Kingdom
- Branch: British Army (TA)
- Service years: 1960–1998
- Rank: Colonel
- Unit: Royal Engineers
- Commands: Commander RESAT
- Awards: Territorial Decoration

Edward Philip Frank "Ted" Rose TD FGS is an English palaeontologist and geologist, best known as a historian of military aspects of geology.

== Academic career ==
From Emanuel School, in south-west London, Rose matriculated at St Edmund Hall in the University of Oxford in 1960. He took part in the Oxford Expedition to Cyrenaica 1961, later captained the St Edmund Hall fencing team, became Hall representative for the Oxford University Officers Training Corps, was elected secretary and later chairman of the Oxford University Geological Society, and in 1963 graduated as an Honorary Scholar of St Edmund Hall with First Class Honours in Natural Sciences: Geology. He remained at the Hall but transferred academic studies from the Department of Geology and Mineralogy to the Department of Zoology, funded by a research studentship from the UK Department of Scientific and Industrial Research, to undertake research on fossil echinoids (sea urchins) which he collected from Cenozoic limestones near Derna in Cyrenaica, north-east Libya.

On completing studies and submitting his thesis for a DPhil (Doctor of Philosophy) degree in 1966, Rose was immediately appointed to an Assistant Lectureship in Geology at Bedford College in the University of London. Granted tenure and promoted to Lecturer in 1968, he taught palaeontology and stratigraphy in this small department, sharing a heavy teaching and administrative load and additionally being elected to serve for two years as Secretary to the Bedford College Faculty of Science and its subordinate and associated committees, and for two periods as a member of the College's Academic Board.

In 1985 Bedford College merged with Royal Holloway College to form Royal Holloway and Bedford New College (now commonly known as Royal Holloway, University of London), and the formerly separate geology departments of Bedford, Chelsea and King's Colleges merged on the Royal Holloway site. Rose prepared the detailed feasibility plan for departmental merger, chaired the committee set up to formulate plans for a new building to accommodate the new geology department (much later to be renamed as the Department of Earth Sciences), and chaired the teaching committee that formulated its first degree programmes. He then led teaching of palaeontology and stratigraphy to first, second and third year undergraduates, chaired the department's undergraduate teaching committee for 12 of the next 15 years, and served as the department's ‘academic co-ordinator’ (effectively director of undergraduate studies) for the final eight of those years, having been promoted to Senior Lecturer in 1987 under ‘old regulations’ (whereby only 40% of staff in any university were allowed to hold status higher than that of lecturer). Between 1976 and 1999 nine PhD students and one MPhil student successfully completed research degrees under his supervision. He retired to a ‘teaching only’ position in 2000, on reaching the age of 60, and to an honorary research fellowship at Royal Holloway on full retirement in 2003.

== Palaeontology ==
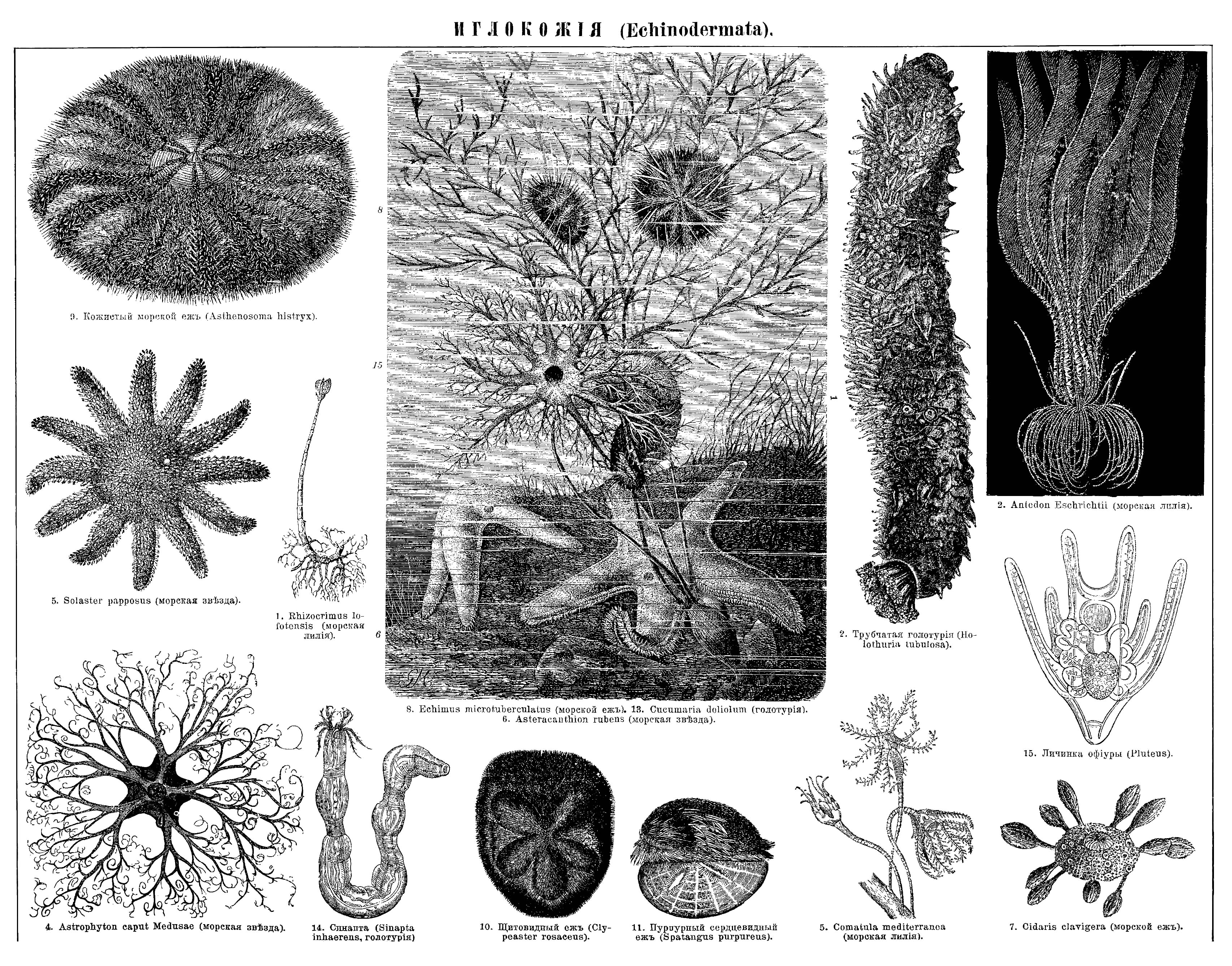
Various echinoderms

Rose's interest in palaeontology began as a schoolboy. He cycled from his parental home in south London to collect fossils, especially echinoids, from the many quarries in Cretaceous chalk then accessible to the south and east of London. Encouraged by palaeontologists at the Natural History Museum in London (then known as the British Museum (Natural History)), he also developed an interest in Cenozoic fossils, on request donating several specimens collected from the London Clay to the Museum's collection – his name first appeared in a scientific paper when he was only 14 years old: in the ‘acknowledgements’ within ‘Additions to the London Clay fauna of Oxshott, Surrey’ by M.M. Brown and C. P. Castell, published in 1955 in The London Naturalist.

Echinoids that Rose found when participating in the Oxford Expedition to Cyrenaica 1961 prompted him to return to Libya in 1964 and to develop studies in the Derna District for his doctoral thesis. He continued research on echinoids after appointment to Bedford College, being a regular contributor (as a speaker and frequently a session chairman) to the series of International Echinoderm Conferences initiated in 1972, and to the European Echinoderm Conferences formally instituted in 1979 (following an earlier conference which he co-convened at Bedford College): at the Smithsonian Institution, Washington DC, USA (1972), Rovinj Marine Institute, Yugoslavia (1976), Free University of Brussels, Belgium (1979), University of South Florida, USA (1981), University College Galway, Ireland (1984), University of Victoria, Canada (1987), University of Burgundy, France (1993), California Academy of Sciences, San Francisco, USA (1996), and the University of Milan, Italy (1998). His participation ended only with his retirement from funded academic life in the year 2000. As sole or joint author, he published 29 articles on fossil or living echinoderms between 1972 and 1999, including the section on echinoids within Chapter 25 Echinodermata of The Fossil Record 2 (ed. M.J. Benton, 1993), a benchmark book published by the Palaeontological Association (ISBN 978-0412393808).

Rose became an active member of the Palaeontological Association, elected to its Council (1969–1972) only three years after his appointment to Bedford College, elected as Membership Treasurer (1973–1978) and finally as a Vice-President (1978–1980), serving on the Council and its Executive and Publication Committees. He similarly served for ten years on the Council of the Palaeontographical Society (1975–1985), the final four of those years as a Vice-President.

In 1981 he was appointed a trustee of the International Trust for Zoological Nomenclature (that from 1947 to 2015 facilitated the work of the International Commission on Zoological Nomenclature) on the recommendation of its secretary, R.V. Melville, who had served as the external examiner for his DPhil thesis, and was elected to serve on its committee of management from 1982 until his resignation in 2006, prior to potential house move.

Three of Rose's PhD students completed theses on fossil echinoids, four more theses on other palaeontological topics.

== Geology ==
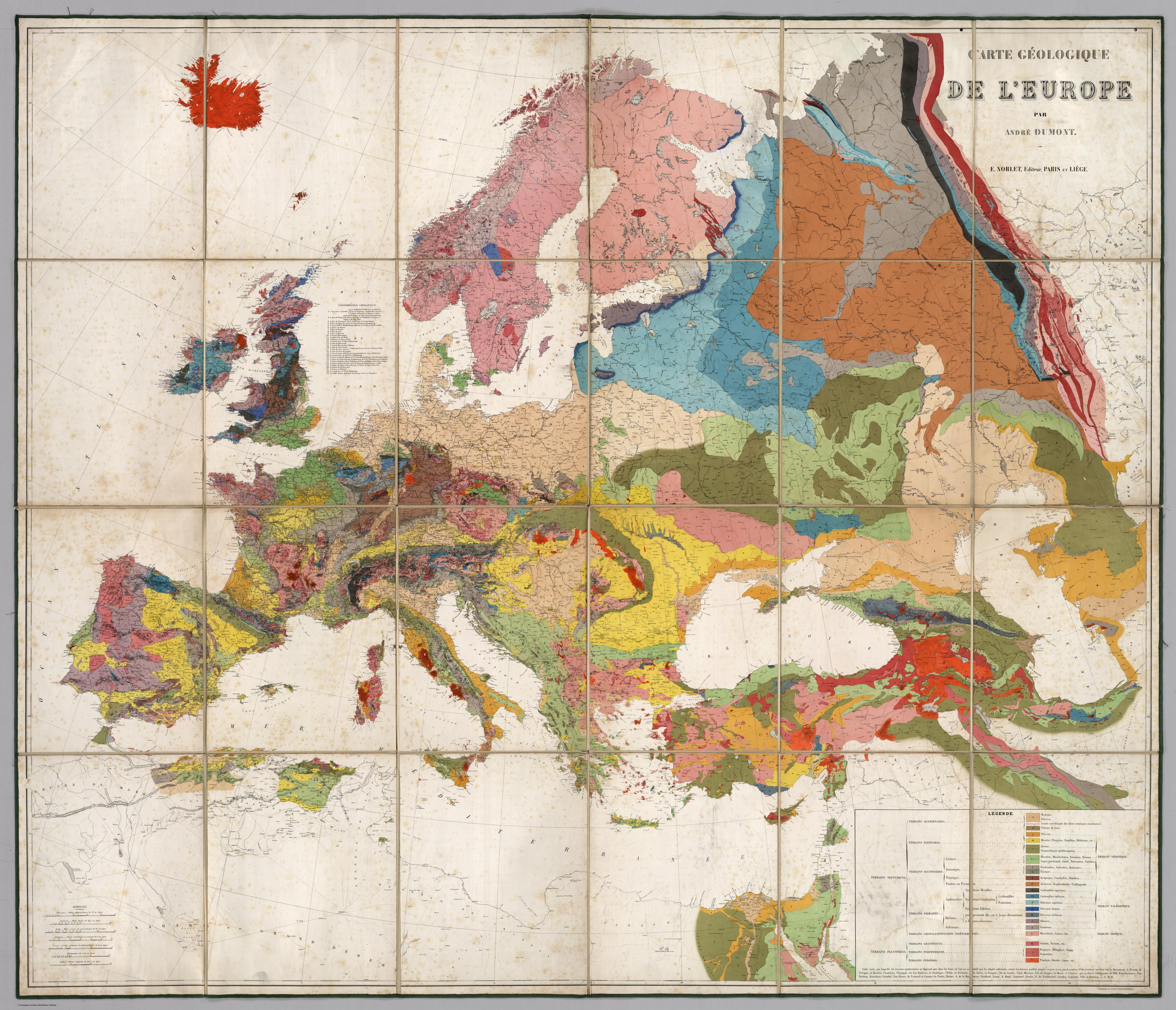
An 1875 geological map of Europe, compiled by the Belgian geologist André Dumont (colors indicate the distribution of rocks of different ages and types across the continent, as they were known then)

From 1971, Rose extended work on limestones in the Mediterranean area begun by his DPhil thesis by contributing to the work of the IUGS (International Union of Geological Sciences) Regional Committee on Mediterranean Neogene Stratigraphy (RCMNS). He presented papers at the 5th International Congress on the Mediterranean Neogene (Lyon, France, 1971), 6th Congress (Bratislava, Czechoslovakia, 1975), 7th Congress (Athens, Greece, 1979), 8th Congress (Budapest, Hungary, 1985), and 9th Congress (Barcelona, Spain, 1990), as well as at an ad hoc Ecostratigraphy Colloquium (Montpellier, France, and Barcelona, Spain, 1987). He was co-convener, session chairman and speaker at a ‘Colloquium on Marine Neogene Megafaunal Palaeoenvironments and Biostratigraphy’ at the University of Athens in 1984; elected UK representative on the RCMNS Council for 1984–1985; and at the 7th Congress elected co-leader of the working group on ‘Marine Megafaunal Palaeoenvoronments and Biostratigraphy’.

From 1977 to project completion in 1983, Rose served (by invitation of the then Royal Society's British National Committee for the IUGS/UNESCO International Geological Correlation Programme) as UK national correspondent for Project 25 (Stratigraphic Correlation of the Tethys-Paratethys Neogene) and Project 117 (Correlation of events at the Mio-Pliocene Boundary). From 1978 to 1986 he was appointed a member of the IUGS Commission on Stratigraphy's ‘Working Party on the Palaeogene-Neogene Boundary’.

Rose was an invited speaker at the Second Symposium on the Geology of Libya, at Tripoli, in 1978; helped lead fieldwork for petroleum consultancies in Libya in 1978 and Oman in 1982; was briefly a visiting lecturer at the University of El Minia, Egypt, in 1985; and under the auspices of the British Council, a visiting lecturer and D-ès-Sc examiner at the University of Tunis, Tunisia, in 1987.

Rose's research interests in limestone stratigraphy and palaeoenvironments were focused for some years on the Maltese islands (he was co-author of a Field Guide to Mid-Tertiary Carbonate Facies of Malta published by the Palaeontological Association for a field trip for which he was convening leader, in 1981), but subsequently and even more productively on Gibraltar. From 1989 he has, as sole or joint author, generated over 40 publications on the geology of this famous ‘Rock’, including the first large-scale printed map of the peninsula and an accompanying field guide, plus papers on topics including the stratigraphy, depositional palaeoenvironments, dolomitisation, brachiopod palaeontology, micropalaeontology, hydrogeology, and tunnelling excavation of the Jurassic ‘Gibraltar Limestone’, aspects of its Quaternary geomorphology and sedimentary cover, and the history of research by British pioneers of Gibraltarian geology.

Rose was elected a Fellow of the Geological Society of London (FGS) in 1963, and a Senior Fellow in 2013, having been accredited as a Chartered Geologist (CGeol) in 1991.

Two of his PhD students completed theses on Cenozoic limestones (one for Malta and the other Sicily), and an MPhil student completed a thesis on Cenozoic sediments of northern Iraq.

== Military aspects of geology ==
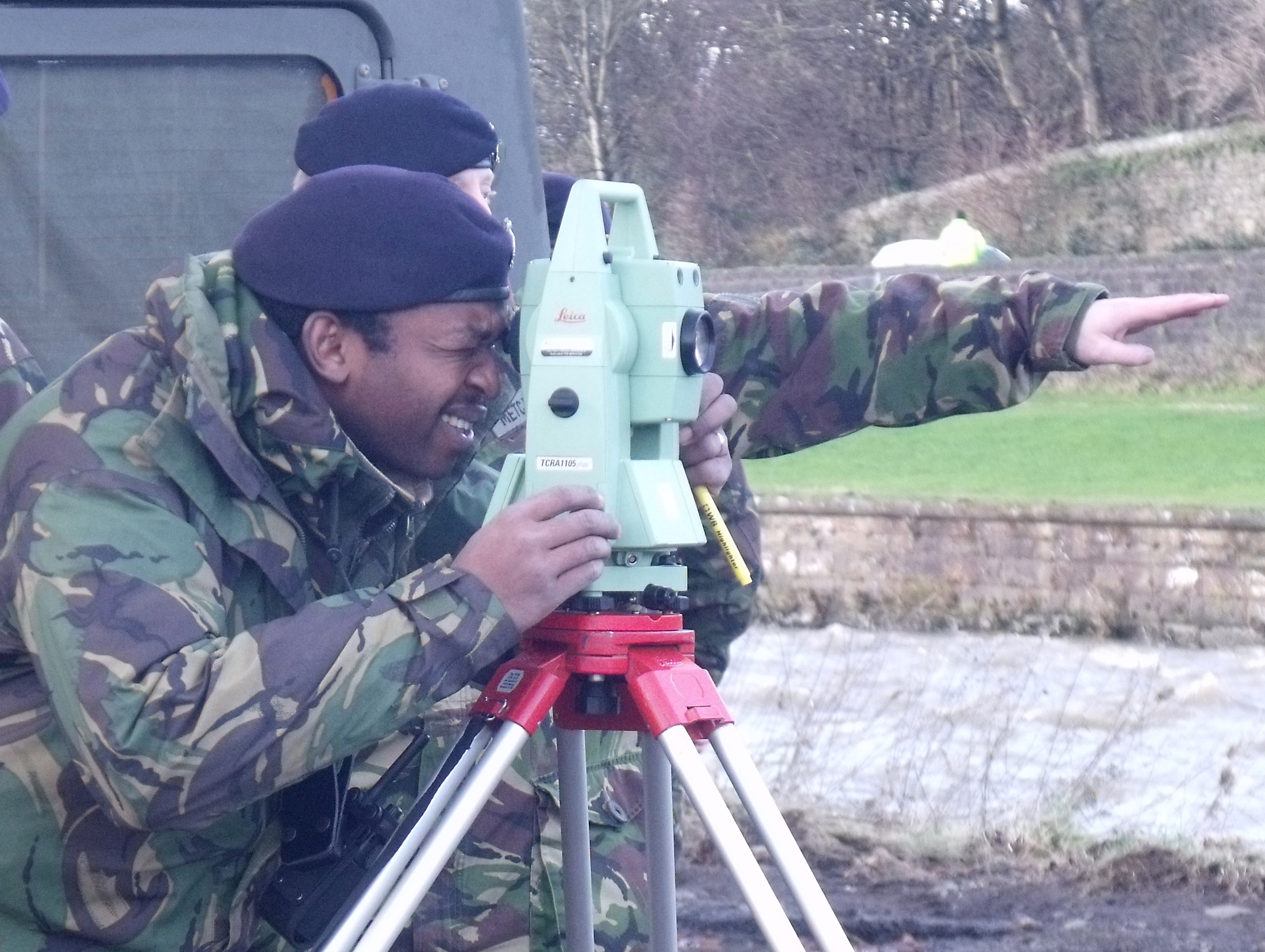
Royal Engineers' Surveyors in Europe

Rose began an association with the military as with geological research at the age of 14. He joined Emanuel School Combined Cadet Force (CCF) as a cadet in September 1954, as soon as he was old enough (and so then expected to do so), winning the annual recruit's prize at the end of the academic year in 1955. He completed his CCF service in December 1959, as the senior cadet (Flight Sergeant) leading the school's Royal Air Force section.

On admission to the University of Oxford in autumn 1960, Rose joined the Oxford University Officers Training Corps as a cadet, gaining a commission as a 2nd Lieutenant (General List, Territorial Army: TA) in 1962. On graduation in 1963, he transferred to Q (Queen's Own Oxfordshire Hussars) Battery, 299 Field Regiment Royal Artillery (TA), being promoted Lieutenant in 1963 and to the senior subalterns’ post of Gun Position Officer – being selected to march through London, sword reversed, in the State Funeral of the QOOH Honorary Colonel, Sir Winston Churchill, in 1965. On reorganisation of the reserve army in 1967, he transferred to B (Oxford Rifles) Company of the Oxfordshire Battalion, Royal Green Jackets. On further reorganisation in 1969, he transferred to the Engineer Specialist Pool at Central Volunteer Headquarters Royal Engineers (CVHQRE), as a military geologist. In this role he was promoted Captain in 1970, acting Major in 1974 (and substantive Major on achieving the minimum age), acting Lieutenant Colonel in 1978 (and substantive Lieutenant Colonel on achieving the minimum age). He served from 1987 to 1990 as a Colonel, as Commander of the RE Specialist Advisory Team and the ten Specialist Teams RE(V) then administered by CVHQRE to help provide technical expertise necessary to bring the British regular army from peace to war strength. He was awarded the TD (the Long Service Decoration of the Territorial and Army Volunteer Reserve) in 1974, a 1st clasp in 1980, a 2nd clasp in 1986.

During his 21 years as a military geologist (the last 16 of these as the senior geologist with call-out liability), Rose was briefly attached to units of the regular army, Royal Air Force, Royal Navy or United Nations to participate in projects, exercises or operations in the UK and many overseas territories – for the regular British armed forces have no geologists who serve as such. He notably conducted fieldwork in Thailand (1969, 1970), Malta (1973, 1974), Gibraltar (1973–1975, 1981, 1983, 1987), Hong Kong (1978, 1979, 1981), Cyprus (1983, 1985, 1986), Belize (1984) and Germany (1971, 1977–1982, 1985–1987), and generated some 60 unpublished reports, mostly not in the public domain. He also contributed a chapter (on geological maps and other information sources) to the textbook Manual of Applied Geology for Engineers, published in 1976 jointly by the Ministry of Defence and the Institution of Civil Engineers, and for its time influential in educating both military and civil engineers (ISBN 978-0727700384).

On completion of the tenure of his appointment as Commander RESAT (Royal Engineers Specialist Advisory Team) in 1990, in the highest rank then obtainable in the TA by a Royal Engineers officer, Rose transferred to the Regular Army Reserve of Officers, reaching the age limit for his rank in September 1998. In 1996 he was appointed by the University of London Council to its Military Education Committee (MEC), and subsequently elected Deputy chairman, and finally Chairman of the MEC, prior to resignation in 2009 preparatory to moving home from Amersham near London to Christchurch in Dorset, closer to the region in which his wife of 40 years had her family roots. In his MEC role he was active in monitoring the activities of the University of London Officers Training Corps, Royal Naval Unit, and Air Squadron. From 1999 to 2009 he served additionally as the Universities’ Representative Member of the Reserve Forces and Cadets Association for Greater London, and from 2005 to 2009 as a member of the Executive Committee of the Council of Military Education Committees of the Universities of the United Kingdom (COMEC), thus extending his association with university and military activities long beyond his retirement from lecturing.

== Subsequent career and interests ==
Following his retirement from the TA in 1990, Rose has been active in promoting an understanding of the military applications of geology, contributing to the development of what is now an established series of International Conferences on Military Geosciences. He was the only person to attend all the conferences pre 2011 (when an operation for cancer prevented his travel to Las Vegas in the USA): he presented papers in Seattle, USA (1994), Warwick, UK (1996), Toronto, Canada (1998), Chatham, UK (2000), West Point, USA (2003), Nottingham, UK (2005), Quebec, Canada (2007), and Vienna, Austria (2009). He co-convened the Warwick meeting and co-edited its subsequent proceedings book; co-led field trips to Normandy after the Warwick and Nottingham meetings; gave keynote addresses in Nottingham and Quebec; served on the Advisory Committees for meetings at Nottingham, Quebec, Vienna, and Las Vegas; and chaired sessions at most of the conferences in this series. His contributions to the success of the conference series and the international significance of his publications were honoured by a dedicatory article in the Vienna post-conference book: Häusler, H. 2011. Celebrating the 70th birthday of the senior British military geologist Dr Edward P F Rose. In: Häusler, H. & Mang, R (eds) International Handbook Military Geography Vol. 2. Truppendienst, Vienna, pp. 287–297. He resumed attendance in 2013, presenting an opening paper and chairing a session at the next conference in the series (the 10th International Conference on Military Geosciences), at Aviemore in Scotland, and being elected Honorary President of the International Association for Military Geosciences (IAMG) founded at that meeting. He presented two papers and chaired the IAMG Biennial General Meeting at the 11th ICMG, at the US Naval Academy, Annapolis, in June 2015, where he was re-elected President of the IAMG, to complete a four-year term. At the 12th ICMG, at the University of Stellenbosch in South Africa, he presented three more papers and again chaired the Biennial General Meeting of the IAMG, before handing over to his successor as President and being re-elected to the IAMG Council as Past-President for a further four-year term. He gave the opening keynote address and a second paper at the 13th ICMG, at the University of Padua in Italy in June 2019, and served on the conference's organising committee. Rose is a member of the British Commission for Military History.

== Publications ==
Including 20 of his publications on Gibraltar, but excluding abstracts, book reviews and conference reports, Rose has contributed (mostly as sole or first author) to over 120 articles on military aspects of geology, mostly in the Royal Engineers Journal, Geological Society of London, Special Publications, Quarterly Journal of Engineering Geology and Hydrogeology, Earth Sciences History, Cartographic Journal, Channel Islands Occupation Review, Geology Today, Proceedings of the Geologists' Association, and Reviews in Engineering Geology. Overall these contribute to an understanding of military aspects of geology from their first perception during Napoleonic times at the turn of the 18th/19th centuries; introduction of geology into the curriculum at all the military officer training establishments in England during the 19th century and influence in the establishment of what is now the British Geological Survey; use by uniformed officers of opposing armies to guide groundwater abstraction and military tunnelling during World War I; and use to guide groundwater abstraction and terrain evaluation (especially by specialist maps to guide rapid construction of temporary airfields and choice of routes for cross-country movement by tracked or wheeled vehicles) during World War II. The book Geology and Warfare (published by the Geological Society of London in 2000), for which Rose was the senior of two editors, was the first of its kind in the UK; additionally, his published case histories of German military geological work during occupation of the Channel Islands have provided a unique insight into German expertise deployed on British terrain during World War II; and a 2003 Geologists’ Association Guide to the Geology of the D-Day landings in Normandy, 1944 (for which he was the senior of two authors), together with related articles, have provided an exceptionally detailed record of the influence of geology and geologists on the greatest amphibious assault in world history. Rose was the senior co-editor of and a major contributor to the book Military Aspects of Hydrogeology (published by the Geological Society of London in 2012) and also its companion volume, Military Aspects of Geology: Fortification, Excavation and Terrain Evaluation, published by the Society online in 2018 (to help mark the centenary of the end of the First World War) and in hard copy in January 2019.

== Bibliography ==
- A field guide to the geology of Gibraltar (1991) ASIN B00128CA3O
- Geology and Warfare (2000) ISBN 978-1-86239-065-2
- Geology of the D-Day Landings in Normandy, 1944 (2002) ISBN 978-0-900717-99-4
- Military Aspects of Hydrogeology (2012) ISBN 978-1-86239-340-0
- Military Aspects of Geology: Fortification, Excavation and Terrain Evaluation (2018) ISBN 978-1-78620-394-6

== Awards ==
Rose has received awards from the Institution of Royal Engineers (in 1978, 1990, 1993, 1996 and 2002) for ‘articles of especial merit published in The Royal Engineers Journal’; in 2005 he and junior co-author Dierk Willig received the Henry Johns Award of the British Cartographic Society for ‘the most outstanding article published in The Cartographic Journal during the [previous] calendar year’; and in late 2015 he received a prize from the Defence Surveyors’ Association for the best article published that year in its journal The Ranger.

In 2008, Rose was one of the first nine fellows (FInstRE) to be appointed by the Council of the (newly-chartered) Institution of Royal Engineers, in recognition of his ‘exceptional commitment to the Institution and Corps of Royal Engineers’. In 2014, he received the Sue Tyler Friedman Medal of the Geological Society of London for excellence in research into the history of geology.
