= Halfaya Pass =

Mountain pass in northwest Egypt

Coordinates: 31°30′18″N 25°11′15″E

Halfaya Pass (Arabic: ممر حلفيا, romanized: Mamarr Ḥalfayā Egyptian Arabic pronunciation: [ma.marr ħal.fæyaː]) is in northwest Egypt, 11.5 kilometres east of the border with Libya and 7.5 kilometres south of the other, more major pass in the ridge today. A 600-foot-high (180 m), narrow escarpment extends south then southeastwards for a total of 55 kilometres (34 mi) from a short distance east of the border. It hems in east-facing small harbour town of as-Salum, continuing as an east-facing sea cliff further north. Land to the east is lower than that to the west and the east side has steep slopes.

The pass is centred 1.6 miles (2.6 km) inland from the closest part of the shore. It makes for a subtle wind gap in the escarpment for the east-west land route. It made for the southern Mediterranean coastal road useful to Mediterranean civilizations until the pass at as-Salum was enlarged after World War II.

Among veterans of Allied forces from 15 June 1941 and thereafter it was nicknamed Hellfire Pass.

The escarpment is known as Akabah el-Kebir "great ascent". To El-Edrisi it was known as ʿAqaba as-Sallūm "graded ascent", whence the modern name of the gulf/bay and the town of Salum. To ancient Rome it was known as Catabathmus Magnus, in the peak of whose empire it divorced Aegyptus from Marmarica. The range was seen as a demarcator of Africa and Asia in some Hellenistic geography.

== World War II ==
In World War II, the engineered route up the escarpment had been destroyed and the pass had great strategic importance. The only ways westwards into Libya were to assault the pass or to out-flank it to the south.

After the defeat of the Italian Tenth Army on 7 February 1941 during Operation Compass, the Italians were reinforced by German units (Afrika Korps under Erwin Rommel) and the British forces were forced out of Libya, leaving besieged garrison at Tobruk. On 14 April 1941, Rommel's main force reached Sollum and occupied the Halfaya Pass. Allied attempts to recapture the pass and relieve Tobruk followed.

The first attempt, on 15 May, was Operation Brevity. Rommel counter-attacked; the British withdrew and by 27 May the Germans had recaptured Halfaya Pass, a passage of time in which Major Edward Thomas earned his Military Cross. Supply shortages obliged the Germans to curtail their advance, so they dug in and fortified their positions at Halfaya with 88 mm guns. This was the anchor for the Axis positions, which opposed the Allied forces during the next allied attack.

This was Operation Battleaxe on 15 June. German armour was deployed to draw the British tanks (11th Hussars) onto the concealed 88mm guns and the first wave was cut down in a few minutes (11 out of 12 tanks were destroyed), earning the pass the nickname "Hellfire Pass". The German commander, Major Wilhelm Bach, in his conduct of the Axis defence of Halfaya Pass earned himself the nickname German: Pastor des Fegefeuers lit. transl. Pastor of Hellfire (an allusion to his peacetime occupation as a Lutheran minister and the English nickname Hellfire Pass). The commander of the larger Italian contingent, General Fedele de Giorgis, General Officer Commanding 55th Infantry Division Savona, was awarded the highest German decoration, the Knight's Cross for the defense he conducted. A British tank commander was last heard on the radio reporting, "They are tearing my tanks apart."

The third attempt, Operation Crusader opened on 18 November, with an attack on Sidi Omar to the west of the pass and an attempt to outflank Rommel to the south and relieve Tobruk. This was achieved on 29 November. Rommel, now under pressure, on 7 December withdrew to El Agheila. Axis garrisons at Sollum, Bardia as well as the Pass were left behind, a temporary thorn in the Allies side. Isolated after the fall of Bardia on 2 January 1942, besieged by Commonwealth forces, cut off from supplies, and bombarded from the air and the sea, Bach and de Giorgis finally surrendered the Halfaya garrison of 4,200 Italians of the 55th Savona and 2,100 Germans, to the South African 2nd Infantry Division on 17 January 1942.

The pass was scene of the accidental death of Major-General 'Jock' Campbell (VC), then commander of the British 7th Armoured Division. On 26 February 1942, a month after assuming command, his staff car overturned on the newly laid clay surface, killing him outright.

== Bibliography ==
- Mead, Richard (2007). Churchill's Lions: A biographical guide to the key British generals of World War II. Stroud (UK): Spellmount. p. 544 pages. ISBN 978-1-86227-431-0.
