= Robert Macleod (Australian politician) =

Australian politician

Robert Macleod is the former mayor of the City of Palmerston, Northern Territory. He was mayor from May 2007 until his resignation in February 2012, replaced by alderman Graeme Chin. He was appointed mayor following the retirement of Annette Burke, and resigned following prosecution and jail time served for assaulting his neighbours with a golf club.
