= Randle Darwall-Smith =

English cricketer

Randle Frederick Hicks Darwall-Smith (11 July 1914 – 17 July 1999) was an English cricketer active from 1935 to 1946 who played for Sussex. He was born in Westminster and died in Seaford. He appeared in 46 first-class matches as a righthanded batsman who bowled right arm fast medium. He scored 649 runs with a highest score of 54 and took 151 wickets with a best performance of seven for 44. His older brother, John Darwall-Smith, also played first-class cricket.
