= Wiltshire North and Bath (European Parliament constituency) =

Former European Parliament constituency

- European Parliament constituency
- Boundary within South West England (1994-1999)
- Member state: United Kingdom
- Created: 1994
- Dissolved: 1999
- MEPs: 1

Wiltshire North and Bath was a United Kingdom European Parliament constituency, electing one member. As a result of a boundary reorganization, it came into being for the European Parliament election of 1994 and ceased to exist in 1999, when the United Kingdom abandoned the first-past-the-post system in single-member constituencies for the European elections in England, Scotland and Wales.

Wiltshire North and Bath consisted of the Westminster Parliament constituencies (on their 1983 boundaries) of Bath, Devizes, North Wiltshire, Swindon, Wansdyke, and Westbury. Its only Member of the European Parliament was Caroline Jackson.

The constituency came to an end in 1999, when the UK adopted a form of proportional representation within much larger regional constituencies, and Wiltshire North and Bath was merged into the new South West England European Parliament constituency.

== Members of the European Parliament ==
Elected	Name	Party
1994	Caroline Jackson	Conservative
1999	Constituency abolished: see South West England	

== Election results ==
European Parliament election, 1994
Party	Candidate	Votes	%	±%
Conservative	Caroline Jackson	71,872	34.9	
Liberal Democrats	Mrs. Jeanie H.H. Matthew	63,085	30.6	
Labour	Mrs. N.P.J. (June) Norris	50,489	24.5	
Liberal	Paul J.P. Cullen	6,760	3.3	
Green	Miller Davidson	5,974	2.9	
UKIP	Timothy P.E. Hedges	5,843	2.8	
Natural Law	David R.H. Cooke	1,148	0.6	
Christian People's Party	Johnathan R.D. Day	725	0.4	
Majority		8,787	4.3	
Turnout		205,896		
Conservative win (new seat)				
