= John Arnway =

English-born royalist divine and clergyman (1601–1653)

- Born: 1601; Shropshire, England
- Died: 1653 (aged 51–52); Colony of Virginia, English America
- Education: St. Edmund Hall, Oxford
- Occupations: Royalist divine; church official; clergyman
- Notable work: The Tablet (1650); An Alarum to the Subjects of England (1650)
- Title: Rector of Hodnet and Ightfield (from 1635); Archdeacon of Lichfield and Coventry; Prebendary of Wolvey

Religious life
- Religion: Christianity
- Denomination: Church of England
- Church: Protestant

John Arnway (1601–1653) was an English-born royalist divine, church official, and clergyman.

== Life ==
Arnway was of a Shropshire family and heir to a considerable estate. He was a commoner of St. Edmund Hall, Oxford, and in 1635 rector of Hodnet and Ightfield. When he joined the king at Oxford in 1642, the Parliament garrison at Wem plundered his house so completely that (according to his own account) they left him neither bible, nor money, nor clothes.

He was promoted to be Archdeacon of Lichfield and Coventry and prebendary of Woolvey. Resuming his activity in the royal service, his estate was sequestrated and he imprisoned until after the King's death. He was then exiled and took refuge at The Hague.

Arnway was compelled by poverty to accept an invitation to exercise his function among the English in Virginia. There he died, it is supposed, in 1653.

== Works ==
In 1650, at The Hague, Arnway published two pamphlets:

- The Tablet, a vindication of the king against John Milton's Eikonoklastes; and
- An Alarum to the Subjects of England, an account of the oppressions which he and others had suffered.

Both there tracts were reprinted in 1661 by William Rider of Merton College.
