= Earth Sciences History =

- Discipline: History of science and technology
- Language: English
- Edited by: John A. Diemer

Publication details
- History: Since 1982
- Publisher: KnowledgeWorks Global on behalf of the History of Earth Sciences Society
- Frequency: Biannual
- Impact factor: 0.6 (2024)

Standard abbreviations
- ISO 4: Earth Sci. Hist.

Indexing
- ISSN: 0736-623X (print); 1944-6187 (web)
- LCCN: 83642746
- JSTOR: 0736623X
- OCLC no.: 9185224

Links
- Journal homepage; Online access; Online archive; Journal page at society website

Earth Sciences History is a biannual peer-reviewed academic journal covering all aspects of the history of the Earth sciences. It is published by KnowledgeWorks Global on behalf of the History of Earth Sciences Society and was established in 1982.

The journal publishes historical works on all aspects of the Earth sciences. It encompasses diverse approaches to historical research, including biography, history of ideas, social history, and the history of institutions and methods.

== Abstracting and indexing ==
The journal is abstracted and indexed in:

- Current Contents/Physical, Chemical & Earth Sciences
- Current Contents/Earth Sciences
- Current Contents/Social and Behavioral Sciences
- EBSCO databases
- Science Citation Index Expanded
- Scopus
- Social Sciences Citation Index

According to the Journal Citation Reports, the journal has a 2024 impact factor of 0.6.
