= Edward Rose (cricketer) =

English cricketer

Personal information
- Full name: Edward McQueen Rose
- Born: 2 September 1936 (age 90); Oxted, Surrey, England
- Batting: Left-handed
- Bowling: Right-arm off-spin

Domestic team information
- Years: Team
- 1958–1960: Cambridge University

Career statistics
Competition	First-class
Matches	24
Runs scored	700
Batting average	15.55
100s/50s	0/4
Top score	57
Balls bowled	15
Wickets	1
Bowling average	19.00
5 wickets in innings	–
10 wickets in match	–
Best bowling	1/9
Catches/stumpings	8/–
- Source: Cricinfo, 21 May 2015

Edward McQueen Rose (born 2 September 1936) is a former English cricketer who played first-class cricket for Cambridge University from 1958 to 1960.

Rose was educated at Rugby School. In 1955 he captained the First XI, and also opened the batting for the schools team The Rest in the annual match against Southern Schools at Lord's. He went up to Cambridge University, where he played irregularly over three years as an opening and middle-order batsman without achieving a Blue. His best season was 1959, when he played 14 of the team's 19 matches and scored 500 runs at an average of 18.51. His highest score was 57 against Kent in 1959.

He played a few matches for Surrey Second XI between 1959 and 1962. He kept playing club cricket, especially for the Limpsfield club in Surrey, and was a National Cricket Association coach. He captained the Rugby Meteors to victory in the Cricketer Cup in 1973, and toured the United States in 1992 and Canada in 1994 with Marylebone Cricket Club (MCC).

Rose was an industrialist. He wrote How to Win at Cricket, or, the Skipper's Guide (published in 1988), which John Arlott described as "a perceptive and thought-provoking study of captaincy which is expressed most cogently and is, above all, full of good, sound common sense".
