= Upper Thames (European Parliament constituency) =

Former European Parliament constituency

- European Parliament constituency
- Boundary within South West England (1979-1984)
- Member state: United Kingdom
- Created: 1979
- Dissolved: 1984
- MEPs: 1

Upper Thames was a United Kingdom European Parliament constituency, electing one member under the first-past-the-post system. It came into being for the European Parliament election of 1979 and ceased to exist in 1984, due to boundary reorganization.

Upper Thames consisted of the Westminster Parliament constituencies (on their 1974 boundaries) of Abingdon, Devizes, Henley, Newbury, Swindon, Reading North, and Reading South. Its only Member of the European Parliament was Robert Jackson.

== Members of the European Parliament ==
Elected	Name	Party
1979	Robert Jackson	Conservative
1984	Constituency abolished	

== Election results ==
European Parliament election, 1979: Upper Thames
Party	Candidate	Votes	%	±%
Conservative	Robert Jackson	103,488	59.4	
Labour	Patrick H. Gray	39,900	22.9	
Liberal	Jack Ainslie	30,907	17.2	
Majority		63,588	36.5	
Turnout		174,295		
Conservative win (new seat)				
