= John Camkin =

English journalist

William John Camkin, MA (23 June 1922 – 19 June 1998) was an English journalist, football, business and sports administrator.

Camkin was born in Kings Norton, Worcestershire, the son of Bill Camkin and Helena Ethel Holder. His father was managing director of Birmingham City F.C., and also owned a number of billiard and snooker halls in Birmingham. He had introduced a snooker championship which became 'The Embassy Cup' between 1936 and 1956.

Educated at Warwick School and St Edmund Hall Oxford, where he captained the college football first XI, In 1942, he served with the University Air Squadron, and later the Royal Air Force Volunteer Reserve as a navigator with Bomber Command.

== Career as journalist and sports commentator ==
Demobbed in 1946, he resumed his journalistic career (he had worked on a local paper before going up to Oxford) as a sports writer on the Birmingham Gazette. He commentated for BBC Radio for seven years, covering the 1954, 1958, and 1962 World Cups. He wrote a book about the 1958 tournament. ITV had won the rights to cover the 1966 FIFA World Cup alongside the BBC; and John Camkin was part of the team including Hugh Johns, Gerry Loftus, and Barry Davies.

== Interlude with travel ==
Camkin had travelled all over the world reporting football, and after leaving Fleet Street, in 1960 Camkin bought a travel agency in Leamington Spa and built a small group of travel shops known as John Camkin Travel Ltd, throughout the area. These were located in Coventry, Hinckley, Banbury, Nuneaton, Birmingham, London and Dunstable. He is quoted as saying 'I got the idea from my travels'...You know, you never see an old football correspondent-they merely fade away' He sold his business to the Thomson Holidays Travel Group in 1972 and his travel shops were re-branded Lunn Poly.

== Sports administration and directorships ==
He became a director of Coventry City Football Club in 1962. He was instrumental in persuading Jimmy Hill, who at the time was the chairman of the Professional Footballers' Association, to take a management career with the club, which he did from 1961 to 1967. In 1976, Camkin, Hill and Olaf Dixon with the World Sports Academy, the company founded by Jimmy Hill, went to Saudi Arabia to develop football and run the national side there. Later Camkin and Hill undertook another venture backing the Detroit Express team in the North American League. At the end of a successful three-year contract in Saudi, John Camkin and Olaf Dixon returned to England and took over the administration and organisation of the Secretaries' and Managers' Association, the forerunner to the League Managers Association.

Coventry City F.C.'s anthem has been sung on the pitch at the club's stadium to mark the 50th anniversary (22 December 2012) of the song. The Sky Blue Song to the tune of 'the Eton Boating Song' was written by ex-manager Jimmy Hill and former director John Camkin.

As the story is remembered by Jimmy Hill 'I sat down one Sunday night with John Camkin – a board member and commentator for Anglia TV – and we had a few gins, well we had a whole bottle actually, and he'd heard the Eton boating Song on the radio and said 'Why don't we build around that?'

He kept fit by playing cricket for Wellesbourne Cricket Club, (Club captain in 1963) one of the oldest in the country, together with tennis.

In the early 1980s, he managed several promising young golfers, including Howard Clark and Pip Elson who was born in Leamington Spa.

In the 1990s, Camkin lived in Lansdowne Circus, Leamington Spa and was also director of George Dick Travel Ltd (1991–92), and Leamington Tennis Court Co Ltd, (1991–98) John Camkin was Leamington Tennis Court Club (LTCC) chairman from 1978 to 1995. 'A man characterised by a keenly sardonic wit, Camkin could be capricious – if not thoroughly Machiavellian. Never in danger of being described as one of life's most gracious losers, John Camkin was nevertheless excellent company: despite a firmly-stated preference for dogs over humans, he socialised easily – with just about anyone, anywhere.' On assuming the rôle of chairman, he announced that the club’s parlous finances demanded immediate attention. Subscription fees were tripled, and, only a few years later, he oversaw a fundraising campaign which yielded over £100,000. Today, the equivalent sum would stand closer to half a million pounds sterling.

He remained a bachelor, and died of cancer in Leamington Spa, Warwickshire on 19 June 1998, age 75.

== Quotes on football ==
Report on India's 1948 Europe Tour and the first International match, played at Ilford FC ground, Essex, 31 July 1948.

- Another local journalist named John Camkin wrote in his report: 'Boots were the cause of a considerable amount of Indian discomfort last night. They caused goals to be missed, passes to go astray and members of that country’s Olympic team to make many violent contacts with the Boldmere St Michael’s sloping ground at Church Road." "The tourists had been compelled to take to boots, an unusual item of football gear to them, because the heavy rain that fell throughout the game,' Camkin continued. 'Only inside-left Khan was brave enough to leave the hated boots in the dressing-room, but his partner Sarangapani Raman was soon sitting on the touch-line undoing his laces. The boots discarded, he promptly put his head to a centre from Ballsasundara Vajravelu, a veritable coloured Matthews, to score the only goal of the game'.

In an article "Football: The wolves in sheepskin coats: Rich man's indulgence or ego trip disguised as philanthropy?" by Simon O'Hagan studies the changing face of chairmanship, The Independent, Sunday 23 October 1994.

- 'It's basically an ego trip,' says John Camkin, a former secretary of the Football League Executive Staffs Association – now renamed the Institute of Football Management and Administration – which is the body that looks after the interests of non-playing club employees. 'I'd say about 10 to 15 per cent have a genuine love of the game, probably more in the lower divisions where there's not much honour or glory. For the rest, it's just a way of acquiring a position in local society.'

== Books by John Camkin ==
- Boy's Book of All Sports, News Chronicle Publications Dept. 1951,
- News Chronicle and Daily Dispatch Football Annual 1957–58
- World Cup 1958, Rupert-Hart Davis, London 1958, 1st edition 210 pages, black & white photoplates. The only English language book originally published in 1958 with a well-illustrated review of the 1958 World Cup won by Brazil. The competition which unleashed Pelé upon the world. An eye-witness account of the World Cup held in Sweden. The author predicting that the Brazilian defensive formation of the Fourth Back would eventually sweep the soccer world.
- World Cup 1958, published as a Sportsmans Book Club edition, Phoenix House Limited, London, 1959
- News Chronicle & Daily Dispatch Football Annual 1958–59 with Frank Taylor
- Playfair Football Annual 1962–63
- Playfair Football Annual 1963–64
- Playfair Football Annual 1964–1965
- Playfair Football Annual 1966–67

== Sources ==
- TV Sports Presenters
- Anglia TV Matches of the Week 1955–68
- TV Times feature on John Camkin, 'The Voice behind the Vision', by Victor Edwards, 13 December 1963
- Obituary:
- BM&D records and published Camkin family ancestry,
- Famous Coventrians: John Camkin
- List of alumni of St Edmund Hall, Oxford List of alumni of St Edmund Hall, Oxford
- William John Camkin, Company Director Check:
- The Travel Management Group, Press Article: '25 years and still going strong' 2011
- British Film Institute: International Football: English League V. Scottish League 1966

== Notes ==
- John Cankin was a member of the Leamington Tennis Court Club established in 1846. It took inspiration from London clubs such as Whites, Boodles and the Reform. Its creation enabled Warwickshire gentry and the officers of Cavalry Regiments-based nearby to meet, dine, drink and engage in a variety of sports and pastimes. The Cavalry Regiments are no more but the club continues to flourish: membership is burgeoning, the court is busy and the social diary lively.
