= Robert Gibson (engineer) =

British geotechnical engineer

Robert Edward Gibson (12 May 1926 in Felpham - 23 December 2008) was a British geotechnical engineer. He is best known for his research into soil properties for foundation design. A simplified soil model, Gibson soil is named after him.
