= Robert Jackson (Wantage MP) =

British politician (born 1946)

Robert V. Jackson
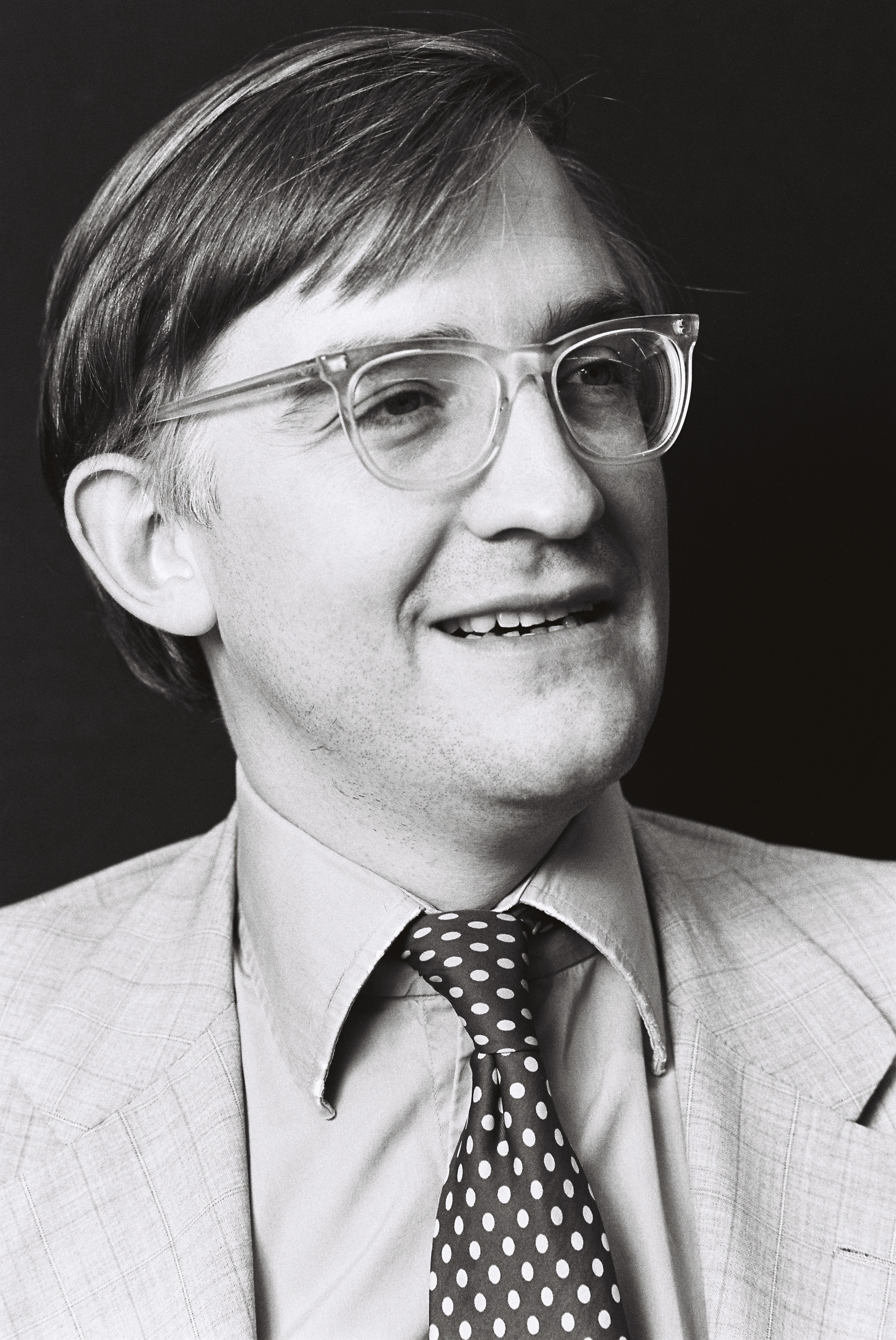

Member of Parliament for Wantage
- In office 9 June 1983 – 11 April 2005
- Preceded by: Constituency established
- Succeeded by: Ed Vaizey

Member of the European Parliament for Upper Thames
- In office 7 June 1979 – 14 June 1984
- Preceded by: Constituency established
- Succeeded by: Constituency abolished

Personal details
- Born: 24 September 1946 (age 79)
- Party: Conservative (before 2005); Labour (since 2005)
- Spouse: Caroline Jackson (m. 1975; died 2025)
- Education: St Edmund Hall, Oxford

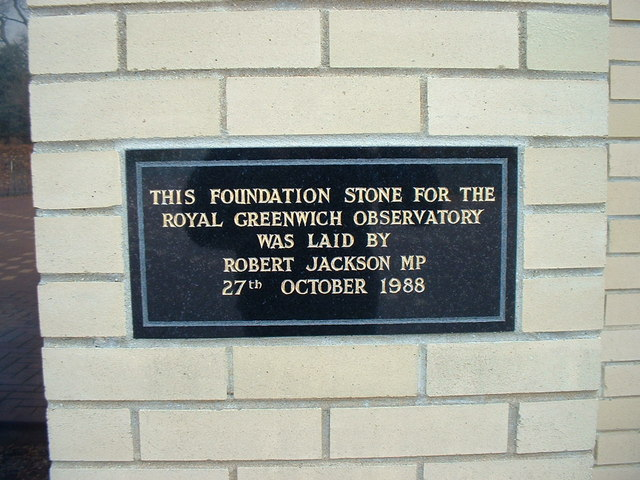
Plaque with his name at Cambridge

Robert Victor Jackson (born 24 September 1946) is a British politician. He was a Member of the European Parliament (MEP) from 1979 to 1984 and member of parliament (MP) for Wantage from 1983 to 2005, having been elected as a Conservative; however, he joined the Labour Party in 2005.

== Early life ==
Jackson was raised in Nkana, Northern Rhodesia (now Zambia), where his father worked on the copper mines. He was educated at Falcon College in Southern Rhodesia (now Zimbabwe), and St Edmund Hall, Oxford, where he rose to the presidency of the Oxford Union. He was then elected to a fellowship of All Souls College, Oxford, one of the UK's most prestigious academic distinctions. He had worked as a political advisor to senior ministers prior to being elected and also as political advisor to the Governor of Rhodesia, Lord Soames, during its transition to independence as Zimbabwe. He edited the Round Table Journal from 1970 to 1974.

== Parliamentary career ==
At the October 1974 general election, Jackson stood in Manchester Central, a safe seat for the Labour Party, without success. At the 1979 European Parliament election, he was elected as a Member of the European Parliament (MEP) for Upper Thames; he played a prominent role on the European Parliament's budget committee.

At the 1983 general election, Jackson was elected to the House of Commons as MP for Wantage. He was subsequently appointed as a junior minister at the Department of Education and Science (1987–90), the Department of Employment (1990–92) and the Office of Public Service and Science (1992–93).

== Resignation ==
On 15 January 2005, Jackson defected to the Labour Party, stating that the Tories had "incoherent" policies on public services, "dangerous" views on Europe, and had "wobbled" on the issue of Iraq. In a letter to his constituency chairman, he wrote: "It is in the country's best interest that Tony Blair rather than Michael Howard should form the next government." Jackson, who had been on the liberal and pro-European wing of the Conservatives, was one of the few Tory MPs who supported the reduction in the age of consent for gay men. He had been treasurer of the Conservative Mainstream association, and supported Kenneth Clarke in the 2001 leadership election.

Before defecting, Jackson had indicated he would not stand in the forthcoming general election, following Iain Duncan Smith's election as Conservative leader, and he duly stepped down in April 2005. At the 2005 general election, Jackson was succeeded by Ed Vaizey, a prominent conservative columnist and pundit who had been selected by the local Conservative Association.

Despite his defection, Jackson has continued to vote for the Conservative Party at subsequent elections. In March 2024, he suggested that he would not want to vote for them again, stating, "They're losing comprehensively in the culture wars."

== Personal life ==
Jackson was married to Caroline Jackson (1946–2025), a long-standing Member of the European Parliament.

== Works ==
- Corbet, Hugh; Jackson, Robert, eds. (1974). In Search of a New World Economic Order. Wiley. ISBN 0-85664-155-3.
- Jackson, Robert (1974). South Asian Crisis: India, Pakistan, and Bangla Desh. Praeger. ISBN 0-275-09560-6.
- —— (1979). The European Parliament: A Guide for the European Elections. Penguin. ISBN 0-14-052330-8.
- —— (1981). Whither the EEC. Braamfontein, South Africa: South African Institute of International Affairs. ISBN 0-909239-94-0.
- —— (1982). Tradition and Reality: Conservative Philosophy and European Integration. European Democratic Group, Conservative Central Office. OCLC 11160487.

Parliament of the United Kingdom
New constituency	Member of Parliament for Wantage; 1983–2005	Succeeded by Ed Vaizey
