= John Darwall-Smith =

English cricketer (1912–1976)

Personal information
- Full name: John Anderton Darwall-Smith
- Born: 12 April 1912; Marylebone, London, England
- Died: 22 June 1976 (aged 64); Hemel Hempstead, Hertfordshire, England
- Batting: Right-handed
- Bowling: Right-arm fast-medium
- Relatives: Randle Darwall-Smith (brother)

Domestic team information
- Years: Team
- 1933–1934: Oxford University

Career statistics
Competition	First-class
Matches	5
Runs scored	98
Batting average	12.25
100s/50s	–/–
Top score	36
Balls bowled	799
Wickets	13
Bowling average	30.23
5 wickets in innings	–
10 wickets in match	–
Best bowling	4/106
Catches/stumpings	2/–
- Source: Cricinfo, 4 June 2019

John Anderton Darwall-Smith (12 April 1912 – 22 June 1976) was an English first-class cricketer. Darwall-Smith played first-class cricket for Oxford University and the Free Foresters in mid-1930s, before serving in the Second World War.

== Life, cricket and war service ==
Darwall-Smith was born at Marylebone in April 1912. He was educated at Winchester College, From Winchester he went up to Trinity College, Oxford. While at Oxford he made his debut in first-class cricket for Oxford University against the touring West Indians in 1933 at Oxford. He made three further first-class appearances for Oxford, playing two more matches in 1933 and one in 1934. He scored 83 runs and took 9 wickets in his four matches, but was unable to establish himself in the Oxford team. While at Oxford he played football for Oxford University and Corinthians. He made a final appearance in first-class cricket for the Free Foresters against Oxford University in 1937.

During the height of the Second World War, Darwall-Smith was commissioned into the King's Royal Rifle Corps as a second lieutenant in March 1941. He was mentioned in dispatches in March 1945, by which point he held the rank of captain. He died in hospital at Hemel Hempstead in June 1976. His younger brother, Randle Darwall-Smith, also played first-class cricket.
