= Robert MacLeod =

Robert James MacLeod (born May 1964) is a British businessman, and the chief executive (CEO) of Johnson Matthey, a British multinational chemicals and precious metals company, from 2014 to 2022.

He succeeded Neil Carson, who was CEO of Johnson Matthey from 2004 until his retirement in 2014.

He was succeeded as CEO by Liam Condon in March 2022.
