= Institute for European Environmental Policy =

Belgian-based non-governmental organization

Institute for European Environmental Policy (IEEP) is an independent, not-for-profit think tank analysing and developing environmental policy in Europe and beyond. The institute is based in Brussels with a branch office in London and a network of partners in other countries, particularly members of the EU. These include universities, environmental and professional associations in a range of sectors, research institutes and consultancies. IEEP works on both pressing short-term questions and long-term strategic studies.

== History ==
IEEP was originally established in Bonn in 1976 by the European Cultural Foundation (ECF). Its first director was Konrad von Moltke who believed that an institute in Bonn, whatever it was called, would be seen as a German institute, and that to be truly European it was necessary to have a presence in several European countries. So he opened IEEP offices, in Paris in 1978 and in London in 1980. Von Moltke established a monthly bulletin initially in French and then also in English called The Environment in Europe. This continued for about ten years and was sent to MPs and MEPs, Committees of parliaments that were beginning to take an interest in this new subject of environmental policy, as well as to ministries.

The London office was initially run as a joint venture with the International Institute for Environment and Development (IIED) that had been founded by Barbara Ward. The IEEP 'office' consisted of a desk at their premises at Percy Street, then occupied by twenty or so people, including the fledgling Earthscan. IEEP London's first director was Nigel Haigh, who stayed until 1998.

== Projects ==
Four projects were planned in the first six months, one of which had to be postponed and modified. They were:

- a comparison of public enquiries in Britain and France
- a study of the effects of the Common Agricultural Policy on wetland drainage in France, Britain, Netherlands and Ireland
- a critique of a European freight forecasting study, and
- an extended essay on the impact of EEC environmental legislation in the UK

Over time structural and financial problems appeared. The head office was in Bonn; the accounts were kept by ECF in Amsterdam in florins but were often so late that they provided little basis for financial management; there were staff in four countries on the payroll of different organisations. The IEEP Board responded by initiating two debates between staff and board, one about the purpose of IEEP, and the other about its structure. The previous director David Baldock took over the running of the London office in 1998. The Brussels office was opened in 2001 as the importance of being close to the EU power structures was realised. Céline Charveriat became executive director in 2016.

== Work ==
IEEP conducts research and analysis providing consultancy and information services, undertaking work both independently and on commissioned projects. IEEP's work focuses primarily on EU environmental and sustainable development policies, and relevant aspects of other policies such as agriculture, transport, rural and regional development, climate change, industrial pollution and fisheries. The institute is also actively engaged in the development of policy at the national level in Europe. IEEP says that it seeks both to raise awareness of the policies that shape the European environmental agenda and to advance policy-making along sustainable paths. IEEP has expert teams specialising in nature conservation, agriculture and rural development policy, fisheries and marine environment, transport, climate change and energy, industrial pollution and waste, sustainable development, impact assessment, environmental integration and governance. IEEP staff come from a broad variety of disciplines including biologists, ecologists, environmental scientists, lawyers, economists and journalists.

== Clients ==
IEEP's clients and audience include the European Commission, European Parliament, national and local governments, non-government organisations (NGOs), industry and others who contribute to the policy debate. It has regular contacts with the full range of policy actors.

== Publications ==
- Transforming EU land use and the CAP: a post-2024 vision
- United for Climate Justice: Background paper
- CAP 2021-27: Comparative analysis of environmental performance of COMENVI and COMAGRI reports
- Assessing and accelerating the EU progress on Sustainable Development Goals (SDGs) in 2019
- Environmental Governance in the EU Member States: status assessment
