= Emanuel School =

Public school in Battersea, London

Coordinates: 51.4566°N 0.1734°W

Location
- Battersea Rise; London, SW11 1HS; England

Information
- Type: Public School; Private day school
- Motto: Pour Bien Desirer (Middle French: The Noble Aim)
- Religious affiliation: Church of England
- Established: 1594; 432 years ago
- Founder: Lady Dacre, Elizabeth I
- Local authority: Wandsworth
- Chair of Governors: Markus Jaigirder
- Headmaster: Ravi Kothakota
- Gender: Coeducational
- Age: 10 to 18
- Enrolment: 1081 (2022)
- Houses: Howe, Clyde, Marlborough, Lyons, Nelson, Drake, Rodney, Wellington
- Colours: Navy blue and gold
- Publication: The Portcullis
- Alumni: Old Emanuels ("OEs")
- Boat club: Emanuel School Boat Club
- Website: emanuel.org.uk

Emanuel School is a private, co-educational day school in Battersea, south-west London. The school was founded in 1594 by Anne Sackville, Lady Dacre and Queen Elizabeth I and today occupies a 12-acre (4.9 ha) site close to Clapham Junction railway station.

The school is part of the Headmasters' and Headmistresses' Conference and at the start of the 2022-23 academic year had 1081 pupils between the ages of ten and eighteen, paying fees of £7,687 per term. It teaches the GCSE and A-Level syllabuses.

== History ==
Emanuel School is one of five schools administered by the United Westminster Schools' Foundation. It came into being by the will of Anne, Lady Dacre, dated 1594. She was the daughter of Sir Richard Sackville by his wife Winifred, a daughter of Sir John Bruges (otherwise Brydges), Lord Mayor of London in 1520-21. Her brother was Thomas Sackville, 1st Earl of Dorset. She married Gregory Fiennes of Herstmonceaux and Chelsea, tenth Baron Dacre, in November 1558. He died on 25 September 1594 and she followed him the next year.

Dacre wrote that one of the main aims of the foundation should be "for the bringing up of children in virtue and good and laudable arts so that they might better live in time to come by their honest labour." With Dacre's benefaction in 1594, Emanuel Hospital (almshouses and school), as it was first called, began. The children wore long brown tunics, rather similar in cut to those still worn by pupils at Christ's Hospital. Thanks to the interest of Queen Elizabeth I, cousin to Dacre, a charter was drawn up, and the school and almshouses were established on a site at Tothill Fields, Westminster. Mention is made of the hospital and similar foundations in an undated letter written by Daniel Defoe, entitled A Scheme for a Royal Palace in the Place of White-Hall.

In 1883, the school moved to the present buildings on the edge of Wandsworth Common. These had been established originally in the late 1850s as Royal Victoria Patriotic School for Boys, for children orphaned during the Crimean War; the building was designed by Henry Saxon Snell. A sister building some 300 metres (980 ft) south, and now known as the Royal Victoria Patriotic Building, housed the Royal Victoria Patriotic School for Girls.

=== Clapham Junction rail crash ===
On 12 December 1988, pupils and teachers were first on the scene of the Clapham Junction rail crash, which happened adjacent to the school. They were later commended for their service by Prime Minister Margaret Thatcher, and the pupils received an "Outstanding Endeavour" award from the BBC Television children's programme, Blue Peter. The school was used as a casualty centre.

== Sport ==
The school has a rowing club called the Emanuel School Boat Club.
