= South West England (European Parliament constituency) =

Former European Parliament constituency

South West
- European Parliament constituency
- Location among the 2014 constituencies

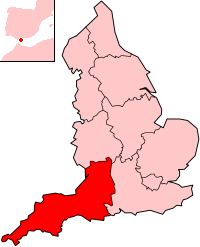
- Shown in England, Gibraltar inset
- Member state: United Kingdom
- Electorate: 3,998,479
- Created: 1999
- Dissolved: 31 January 2020
- MEPs: 7 (1999–2009); 6 (2009–2020)

Sources
- EuroParl 2004 Election – EuroParl

South West was a combined constituency region of the European Parliament, comprising the South West of England and Gibraltar. Seven, later six, Members of the European Parliament using closed party-list proportional representation allocated using the D'Hondt method of distribution were elected. The constituency was abolished when Britain left the European Union on 31 January 2020.

== Boundaries ==
The constituency consisted of the South West England region of the United Kingdom, comprising the ceremonial counties of Bristol, Cornwall, Devon, Dorset, Gloucestershire, Somerset and Wiltshire. It also included the British overseas territory of Gibraltar from 2004.

== History ==
The constituency was formed as a result of the European Parliamentary Elections Act 1999, replacing a number of single-member constituencies. These were Bristol, Cornwall and West Plymouth, Devon and East Plymouth, Dorset and East Devon, Somerset and North Devon, Wiltshire North and Bath, and parts of Cotswolds.

Before the 2004 election, it was expanded to include Gibraltar. This was the result of a 1999 European Court of Human Rights case, which argued that Gibraltar should be entitled to vote in European elections. Spain took a complaint about non-EU Commonwealth citizens resident in Gibraltar participating in European elections to the European Court of Justice, but their case was unsuccessful.

The number of seats was reduced from seven to six for the 2009 election.

MEPs for former South West England constituencies, 1979 – 1999
Election	1979 – 1984	1984 – 1989	1989 – 1994	1994 – 1999
Bristol	Richard Cottrell; Conservative		Ian White; Labour	
Cornwall and Plymouth (1979–1994); Cornwall and West Plymouth (1994–1999)	David Harris; Conservative	Christopher Beazley; Conservative		Robin Teverson; Liberal Democrat
Cotswolds	Lord Plumb; Conservative			
Devon (1979–1994); Devon and East Plymouth (1994–1999)	Lord O'Hagan; Conservative			Giles Chichester; Conservative
Somerset (1979–1984); Somerset and Dorset West (1984–1994); Somerset and North Devon (1994–1999)	Frederick Warner; Conservative	Margaret Daly; Conservative		Graham Watson; Liberal Democrat
Upper Thames (1979–1984); Wiltshire (1984–1994); Wiltshire North and Bath (1994–1999)	Robert Jackson; Conservative	Caroline Jackson; Conservative		
Wessex (1979–1984); Dorset East and Hampshire West (1984–1994); Dorset and East Devon (1994–1999)	James Spicer; Conservative	Bryan Cassidy; Conservative		

== Returned members ==
MEPs for South West England, 1999 onwards
Election	1999 (5th parliament)	2004 (6th parliament)	2009 (7th parliament)	2014 (8th parliament)	2019 (9th parliament)
MEP Party	Michael Holmes; UKIP (1999–2000); Independent (2000–02)	Graham Booth; UKIP	Trevor Colman; UKIP	Julia Reid; UKIP (2014–18); Independent (2018–19); Brexit Party	Ann Widdecombe; Brexit Party
MEP Party	2nd Earl of Stockton; Conservative	Roger Knapman; UKIP	10th Earl of Dartmouth; UKIP (2009–18); Independent (2018–19)		James Glancy; Brexit Party
MEP Party	Caroline Jackson; Conservative		Ashley Fox; Conservative		Christina Jordan; Brexit Party
MEP Party	Neil Parish; Conservative		Julie Girling; Conservative (2009–17); Independent (2017–19); Change UK (2019); Renew		Caroline Voaden; Liberal Democrat
MEP Party	Giles Chichester; Conservative			Clare Moody; Labour	Martin Horwood; Liberal Democrat
MEP Party	Graham Watson; Liberal Democrat			Molly Scott Cato; Green	
MEP Party	Glyn Ford; Labour; GSLP		Seat abolished		

== Election results ==
See also: 2004 European Parliament election in Gibraltar and 2009 European Parliament election in Gibraltar

Elected candidates are shown in bold. Brackets indicate the order in which candidates were elected and number of votes per seat won in their respective columns.

=== 2019 ===
2019 results

European Election 2019: South West England
List	Candidates	Votes	Of total (%)	± from prev.
Brexit Party	**Ann Widdecombe** (1) **James Glancy** (3) **Christina Jordan** (5) Ann Tarr, Roger Lane-Nott, Nicola Darke	611,742 (203,914)	36.84	New
Liberal Democrats	**Caroline Voaden** (2) **Martin Horwood** (6) Stephen Williams, Eleanor Rylance, David Chalmers, Luke Stagnetto	385,095 (192,547.5)	23.19	+12.49
Green	**Molly Scott Cato** (4) Cleo Lake, Carla Denyer, Tom Scott, Martin Dimery, Karen La Borde	302,364	18.21	+7.11
Conservative	Ashley Fox, James Mustoe, Faye Purbrick, Claire Hiscott, James Taghdissian, Emmline Owens	144,674	8.71	–20.19
Labour	Clare Moody, Andrew Adonis, Jayne Kirkham, Neil Guild, Yvonne Atkinson, Sadik Al-Hassan	108,100	6.51	–7.24
UKIP	Lawrence Webb, Carl Benjamin, Anthony McIntyre, Lester Taylor, Stephen Lee, Alison Sheridan	53,739	3.24	–29.05
Change UK	Rachel Johnson, Jim Godfrey, Oliver Middleton, Matthew Hooberman, Elizabeth-Anne Sewell, Crispin Hunt	46,612	2.81	New
English Democrat	Jenny Knight, Michael Blundell	8,393	0.51	–0.49
Independent	Neville Seed	3,383	0.20	New
Independent	Larch Maxey	1,722	0.10	New
Independent	Mothiur Rahman	755	0.04	New
Turnout		1,676,173	40.45	+3.45

=== 2014 ===
2014 results

European Election 2014: South West England
List	Candidates	Votes	Of total (%)	± from prev.
UKIP	**William Dartmouth** (1) **Julia Reid** (3) Gawain Towler, Tony McIntyre, Robert Smith, Keith Crawford	484,184 (242,092)	32.29	+10.2
Conservative	**Ashley Fox** (2) **Julie Girling** (4) James Cracknell, Georgina Butler, Sophia Swire, Melisa Maynard	433,151 (216,575.5)	28.9	−1.36
Labour	**Clare Moody** (5) Glyn Ford, Ann Reeder, Hadleigh Roberts, Jude Robinson, Junab Ali	206,124	13.75	+6.1
Green	**Molly Scott Cato** (6) Emily McIvor, Ricky Knight, Audaye Elesedy, Judy Maciejowska, Mark Chivers	166,447	11.1	+1.8
Liberal Democrats	Graham Watson, Kay Barnard, Brian Mathew, Andrew Wigley, Jay Risbridger, Lyana Armstrong-Emery	160,376	10.7	−6.5
An Independence from Europe	David Smith, Helen Webster, Mike Camp, Andrew Edwards, Phil Dunn, John Taverner	23,169	1.6	New
English Democrat	Alan England, Mike Blundell, Clive Lavelle, Barbara Wright, Stephen Wright, Raymond Carr	15,081	1.0	−0.6
BNP	Adrian Rommilly, Cliff Jones, Arnold Brindle, Wayne Tomlinson, Andrew Webster, Giuseppe De Santis	10,910	0.7	−3.2
Turnout		1,503,174	37.0	−1.8

=== 2009 ===
2009 results

European election 2009: South West England
List	Candidates	Votes	Of total (%)	± from prev.
Conservative	**Giles Chichester** (1) **Julie Girling** (4) **Ashley Fox** (6) Mike Dolley, Don Collier, Zehra Zaidi	468,742 (156,247.3)	30.2	−1.4
UKIP	**Trevor Colman** (2) **William Dartmouth** (5) Gawain Towler, Julia Reid, Alan Wood, Stephanie McWilliam	341,845 (170,922.5)	22.1	−0.5
Liberal Democrats	**Graham Watson** (3) Kay Barnard, Justine McGuinness, Humphrey Temperley, Paul Massey, Jonathan Stagnetto	266,253	17.2	−1.1
Green	Ricky Knight, Roger Creagh-Osborne, Molly Scott Cato, Richard Lawson, Chloë Somers, David Taylor	144,179	9.3	+2.1
Labour	Glyn Ford, Isabel Owen, Keir Dhillon, Dorothea Hodge, Dafydd Emlyn Williams, Eshter Pickup-Keller	118,716	7.7	−6.8
BNP	Jeremy Wotherspoon, Barry Bennett, Adrian Rommilly, Sean Twitchin, Lawrence West, Peryn Parsons	60,889	3.9	+0.9
Pensioners	Jonathan McQueen, Barry Hodgson, Derek Wharton, Roger Edwards, Stuart Baker, Barry Egerton	37,785	2.4	New
English Democrat	Michael Turner, Sara Box, Keith Riley, Stephen Wright, Raymond Carr, Lee Pickering	25,313	1.6	New
Christian	William Capstick, Katherine Mills, Diane Ofori, Larna Martin, Peter Vickers, Adenike Williams	21,329	1.4	New
Mebyon Kernow	Dick Cole, Conan Jenkin, Loveday Jenkin, Simon Reed, Glenn Renshaw, Joanie Willett	14,922	1.0	New
Socialist Labour	Robert Hawkins, Brian Corbett, Alison Entwistle, David Marchesi, Robert Hawkins, James Bannister	10,033	0.6	New
NO2EU	Alex Gordon, Roger Davey, Rachel Lynch, Nick Quirk, John Chambers, Paul Dyer	9,741	0.6	New
Independent	Katie Hopkins	8,971	0.6	New
Libertas	Robin Matthews, Peter Morgan-Barnes, Chloe Gwynne, Christopher Charnock, Nicholas Carlton, Nicholas Charlee	7,292	0.5	New
Fair Pay Fair Trade	David Michael, Judy Foster	7,151	0.5	New
Jury Team	Sally Smith, Martin Paley, Michael Clayton, Brian Underwood, Roger Whitfield, William Barnett	5,758	0.4	New
Wai D Your Decision	Nicola Guagliardo, Joy Margareth Skey	789	0.1	New
Turnout		1,549,708	38.8	+1.2

=== 2004 ===
2004 results

European election 2004: South West England
List	Candidates	Votes	Of total (%)	± from prev.
Conservative	**Neil Parish** (1) **Caroline Jackson** (4) **Giles Chichester** (7) Richard Graham, Earl of Stockton, Jack Lopresti, Julie Girling	457,371 (152,457)	31.6	−10.1
UKIP	**Graham Booth** (2) **Roger Knapman** (6) Trevor Colman, Elizabeth Burton, Matthew Jackson, Michael Faulkner, Andrew Reed	326,784 (163,392)	22.6	+12.0
Liberal Democrats	**Graham Watson** (3) Anthony Welch, Kay Barnard, Simon Green, Christine Coleman, Katie Hall, Alistair Cameron	265,619	18.3	+1.8
Labour	**Glyn Ford** (5) Bernadette Hartley, Ian White, Clare Moody, Keir Dhillon, Julie Watts, David Roberts	209,908	14.5	−3.6
Green	David Taylor, Emily McIvor, Carol Kambites, Anthony Bown, Lyana Armstrong-Emery, Katharine Chant, Paul Edwards	103,821	7.2	−1.1
BNP	Anthony North, Michaela Mackenzie, Barry Bennett, Edward Mullins, Robert Baggs, Bruce Cowd, Frederick Paynter	43,653	3.0	+2.1
Countryside	Chris Thomas-Everard, Brian Crawford, Diana Scott, Ranulph Fiennes, Archibald Montgomery, John Yewdall	30,824	2.1	New
Respect	Paulette North, Sami Velioglu, Hannah Packham, Ann Thomas, John Bampfylde, Bernard Parkes, Anthony Staunton	10,437	0.7	New
Turnout		1,448,417	37.6	+10.0

=== 1999 ===
1999 results

European election 1999: South West England
List	Candidates	Votes	Of total (%)	± from prev.
Conservative	**Caroline Jackson** (1) **Giles Chichester** (2) **Earl of Stockton** (5) **Neil Parish** (7) David Martin, Bryan Cassidy, Paul Marland	434,645 (108,661.25)	41.7	
Labour	**Glyn Ford** (3) Ian White, Sue Mallory, James Knight, Marion Dewar, John Shepherd, Elizabeth Lisgo	188,362	18.1	
Liberal Democrats	**Graham Watson** (4) Robin Teverson, Terrye Jones, Paula Yates, Alan Butt-Philip, Janice Beasley, Simon Green	171,498	16.5	
UKIP	**Michael Holmes** (6) Graham Booth, Michael Faulkner, Malcolm Wood, Ronald Dickinson, Robert Edwards, George Eustice	111,012	10.6	
Green	David Taylor, Richard Lawson, Simon Pickering, Susan Proud, Hamish Soutar, Carol Kambites, Justin Quinnell	86,630	8.3	
Liberal	Paul Holmes, David Morrish, Lomond Handley, Frederick Stephens, Geoffrey Halliwell, Jean Pollock, Roy Collins	21,645	2.1	
Pro-Euro Conservative	Julian Ayer, Kenneth Daly, David McCrum, Denise Atkinson, Vilma Aris, Philip Taylor, Derek Palmer	11,134	1.1	
BNP	Bruce Cowd, Donald Stevens, Stephen Parnell, Terence Cavill, Barbara Packer, Peter Hart, George Jeffrey	9,752	0.9	
Socialist Labour	David White, Jean Ramshaw, Robert Hawkins, Paul Williams, Giles Shorter, Bernard Kennedy, Brian Corbett	5,741	0.6	
Natural Law	Mark Griffiths, Francis Lyons, Nicholas Cresswell, Margot Hartley, Thomas Dyball, Lynn Royse, Henry Brighouse	1,968	0.2	
Turnout		1,042,387	27.6	

== Campaign for a dedicated Euro-constituency and MEP for Cornwall ==
The Cornish nationalist party Mebyon Kernow campaigned for a separate European Parliament constituency for Cornwall. Until 1994 Cornwall was represented by the much smaller Cornwall and Plymouth constituency.

== See also ==
- 2014 European Parliament election in Gibraltar
