= Robin Teverson, Baron Teverson =

British politician (born 1952)

The Right Honourable The Lord Teverson
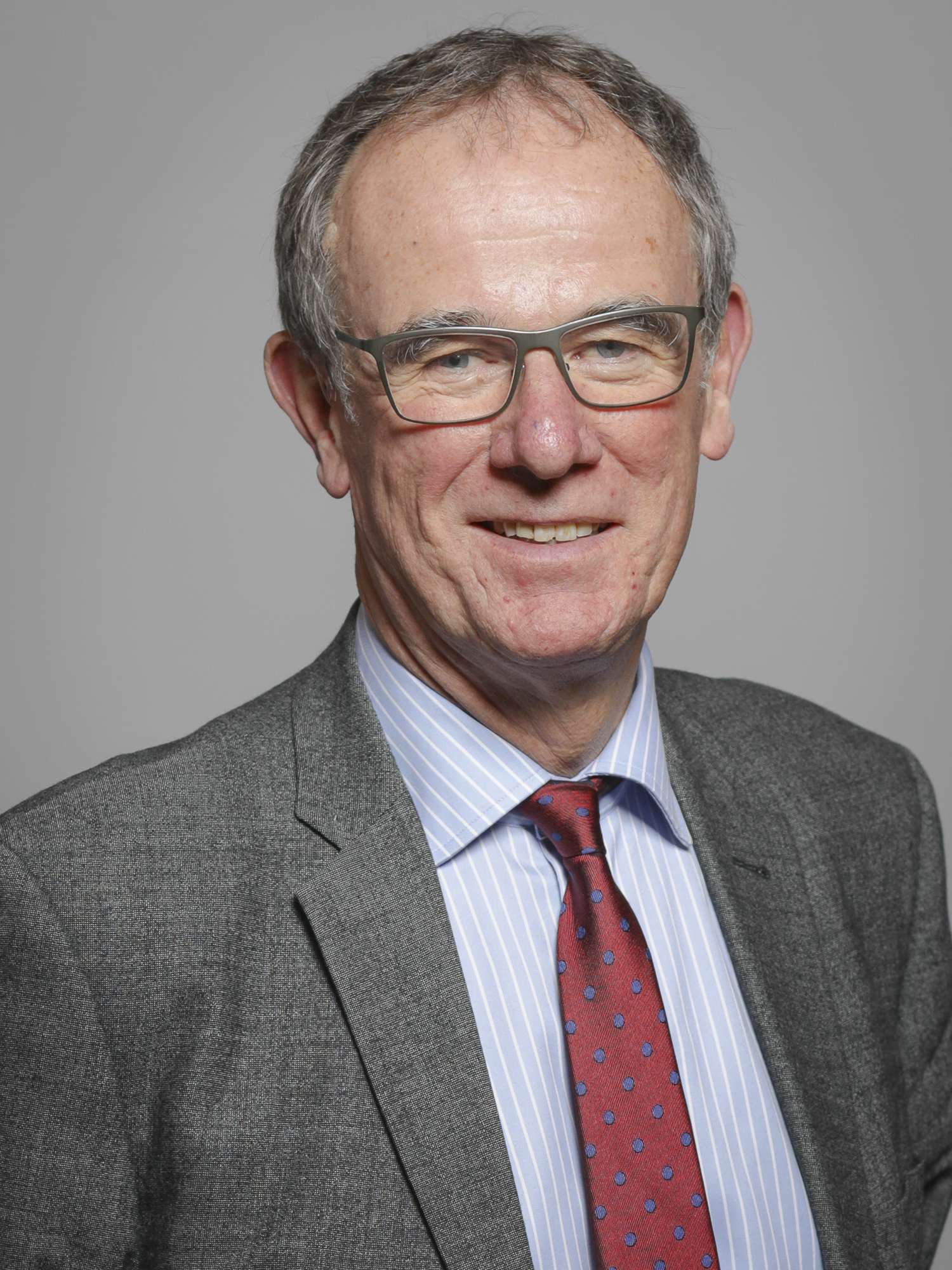

Member of the House of Lords
- Lord Temporal
- Life peerage 1 June 2006

Member of the European Parliament for Cornwall and West Plymouth
- In office 9 June 1994 – 10 June 1999
- Preceded by: Christopher Beazley (Cornwall and Plymouth)
- Succeeded by: Seat merged into South West England

Personal details
- Born: 31 March 1952 (age 74)
- Party: Liberal Democrats
- Spouse: Terrye Jones
- Education: Exeter University
- Website: www.libdems.org.uk

Robin Teverson, Baron Teverson (born 31 March 1952) is a Liberal Democrat politician, and former Member of the European Parliament (MEP).

== Career ==
Teverson was educated at the University of Exeter. He joined the Liberal Democrats, for which he stood unsuccessfully in South East Cornwall at the 1992 United Kingdom general election.

At the 1994 European Parliament election, Teverson was elected Member of the European Parliament (MEP) for Cornwall and West Plymouth, becoming one of the first two Liberal Democrats ever elected to the European Parliament along with Graham Watson in Somerset and North Devon. He was Chief Whip of the European Liberal Democrats from 1997 and 1999. In 1999, he was Chairman of Finance South West Ltd.

At the 1999 European Parliament election, the UK switched from electing MEPs in first past the post constituencies to a form of region-based proportional representation. Each party put forward a list of candidates, and the higher its vote share, the more seats it would be awarded. Watson and Teverson were both MEPs in the South West region, and the Liberal Democrats placed Watson in first position on its list and Teverson in second position. At the election, the Liberal Democrats polled 16.5% of the vote in the South West, entitling them to just one of the region's seven seats. Thus Watson was elected, but Teverson lost his seat.

On 1 June 2006, he was created a life peer as Baron Teverson, of Tregony in the County of Cornwall.

During his time in the Lords he has chaired both the House of Lords EU select sub-committee on External Affairs, and its ad-hoc select committee on the Arctic. He oversaw the publication of the committee's report 'responding to a changing Arctic' which explored 'recent and expected changes in the Arctic and their implications for the UK and its international relations'.

Teverson has sat on the Liberal Democrat Federal Executive and has also previously chaired the Party's national finance committee.

Teverson was elected to Cornwall Council for the new St Mewan ward in the 2009 election. during which time he sat as the deputy leader of the Liberal Democrat group on Cornwall Council. He did not stand in the subsequent 2013 Cornwall Council election.

== Personal life ==
Teverson is the son of Crofton Teverson. He was educated at Exeter University. Teverson was married to Rosemary Anne Young from 1975 to 2005 and they had two daughters. Teverson married Terrye Lynn Jones in 2006. Terrye Jones has stood in parliamentary elections for the Liberal Democrats both before and after marrying Teverson.

Orders of precedence in the United Kingdom
Preceded by The Lord Burnet	Gentlemen; Baron Teverson	Followed by The Lord Morrow
