= Julie Girling =

British independent politician

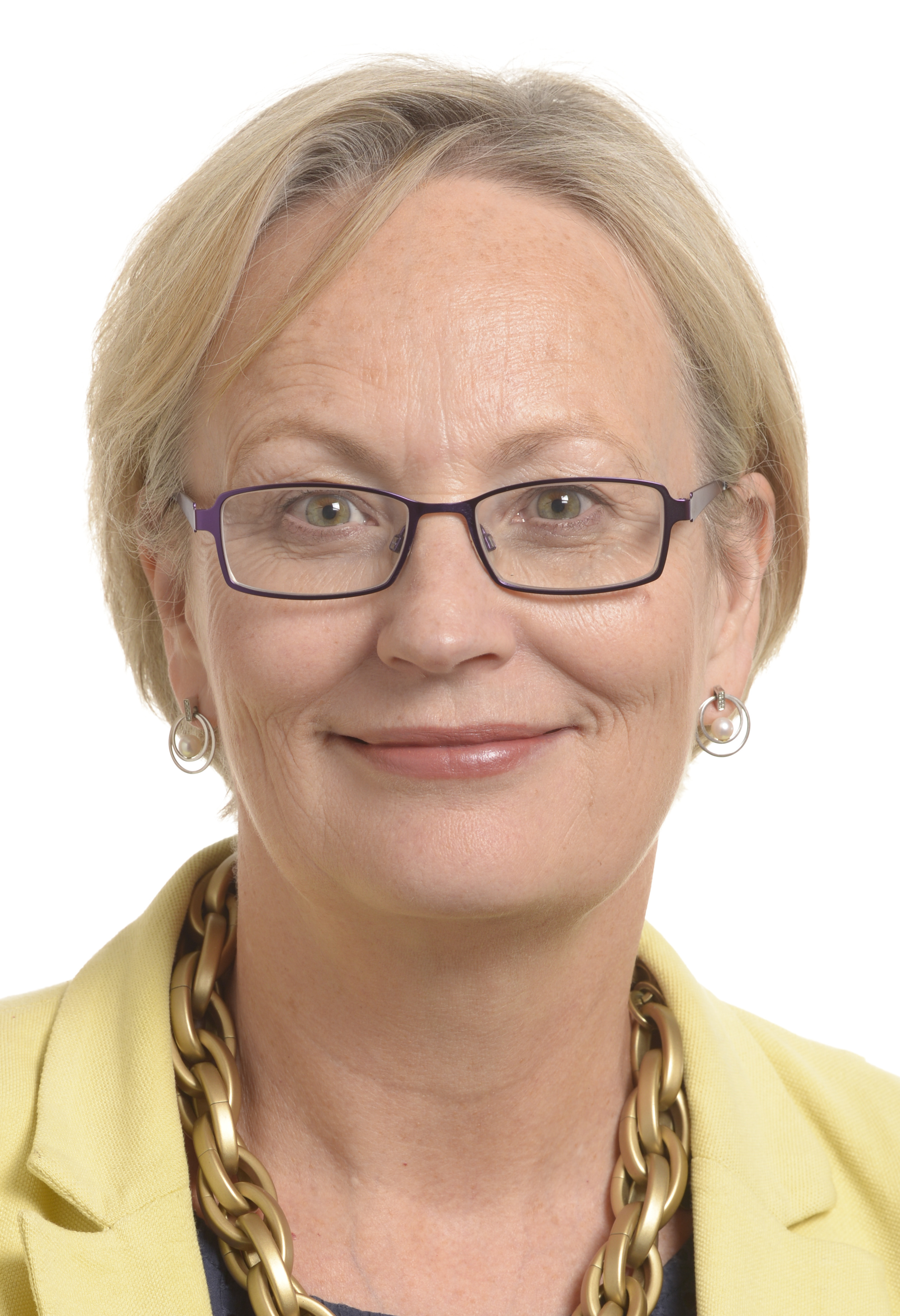

Leader of the Renew Party
- In office 7 June 2019 – 7 July 2020
- Preceded by: Annabel Mullin
- Succeeded by: James Clarke

Member of the European Parliament
- In office 14 July 2009 – 1 July 2019
- Preceded by: Neil Parish
- Succeeded by: Christina Jordan
- Constituency: South West England

Personal details
- Party: Renew Party (2019–2022)
- Other political affiliations: Conservative (1992–2017); Independent (2017–2019)
- Education: University of Liverpool

Julie McCulloch Girling (born 21 December 1956) is a British politician who served as a Member of the European Parliament (MEP) for South West England between 2009 and 2019, and leader of the Renew Party from 2019 to 2020.

Formerly a Conservative, she was suspended from the party in 2017 and in February 2018 joined the European People's Party group, while sitting as an independent. She supported Change UK in April 2019. In May 2019, she called on voters to support the Liberal Democrats, and in June was appointed as interim leader of the Renew Party.

== Life ==
Girling was educated at Twickenham County Grammar School, followed by the University of Liverpool from which she graduated BA in History and Politics in 1979. Her first job was as a graduate trainee with Ford Motors from 1979 to 1982. She then spent six years as a buyer with Argos, leaving in 1988 to become a marketing manager at Dixons. She then held similar positions with Boots and Halfords, which she left in 1993. She was a freelance trainer from 1995 to 2009.

In 1981, she married Warren Glyn Girling; they have one son.

== Political career ==
Girling was a Conservative member of Cotswold District Council from 1999 to 2009, serving as Leader of the Council from 2003 to 2006. She also served on Gloucestershire County Council from 2000 to 2009, rising to become its Cabinet Member for the Environment. She stepped down from both local government leadership positions in the run-up to the European Parliament elections of 2009, at which she was elected as a Member of the European Parliament for South West England.

She and fellow MEP Richard Ashworth were suspended from the Conservative Party and had the whip withdrawn on 7 October 2017, after both supported a vote in Strasbourg stating that not enough progress had been made in the first-stage Brexit negotiations to allow discussion to move onto the trade-deal phase of the talks; however, they remained in the European Conservatives and Reformists (ECR) parliamentary group. On 28 February 2018, both MEPs left the ECR group to join the European People's Party group.

On 16 April 2019, it was announced that both Girling and Ashworth had joined Change UK. Girling said she was "looking forward to being able to use my extensive experience as part of the Change UK team". However, on 10 May, Girling encouraged Remain supporters in the South West to vote for the Liberal Democrats in the 2019 European Parliament election, saying they are "clearly the lead Remain party in the South West". Girling and Change UK later stated that she had never been a member or one of their MEPs. She did not stand for re-election in 2019.

On 7 June 2019 she became interim leader of the Renew Party.

On 18 November 2019, and in her role as leader of Renew, she was one of four minor party representatives who took part in an election debate for LBC Radio ahead of the 2019 general election; the debate was chaired by Iain Dale.

Girling announced her intention to step down from her leadership role in July 2020. James Clarke was elected to succeed her on 7 July 2020.
