= Dorset and East Devon (European Parliament constituency) =

Former European Parliament constituency

- European Parliament constituency
- Boundary within South West England (1994-1999)
- Member state: United Kingdom
- Created: 1994
- Dissolved: 1999
- MEPs: 1

Dorset and East Devon was a European Parliament constituency covering all of Dorset in England, with the exception of Christchurch, plus parts of eastern Devon.

Prior to its uniform adoption of proportional representation in 1999, the United Kingdom used first-past-the-post for the European elections in England, Scotland and Wales. The European Parliament constituencies used under that system were smaller than the later regional constituencies and only had one Member of the European Parliament each.

It consisted of the Westminster Parliament constituencies (on their 1983 boundaries) of Bournemouth East, Bournemouth West, Honiton, North Dorset, Poole, South Dorset, and West Dorset.

The constituency replaced parts of Devon, Somerset and West Dorset and Dorset East and Hampshire West. It became part of the much larger South West England constituency in 1999.

== Members of the European Parliament ==
Elected	Name	Party
1994	Bryan Cassidy	Conservative

== Results ==
European Parliament election, 1994: Dorset and East Devon
Party	Candidate	Votes	%	±%
Conservative	Bryan Cassidy	81,551	36.4	
Liberal Democrats	Philip Goldenberg	79,287	35.4	
Labour	Antony Gardner	39,856	17.8	
UKIP	Malcolm R. Floyd	10,548	4.7	
Green	Krystyna Bradbury	8,642	3.8	
Ind. Conservative	Ian Mortimer	3,229	1.4	
Natural Law	Mark Griffiths	1,048	0.5	
Majority		2,264	1.0	
Turnout		224,161	42.1	
New creation: Conservative win.		Swing	N/A	
