= Mary Clark-Glass =

Politician and academic from Northern Ireland

Mary Clark-Glass CBE

Head of the Northern Ireland Equal Opportunities Commission
- In office 1984–1992

Personal details
- Born: April 1944 (age 81)
- Political party: Alliance Party of Northern Ireland

Mary Burnell Clark-Glass (born April 1944) CBE is an academic, medical administrator and former politician in Northern Ireland.

Clark-Glass became a lecturer in law at the Queens University of Belfast in 1974, and became a known as a commentator on legal and human rights issues and as a prominent feminist. In 1984, she became head of the Northern Ireland Equal Opportunities Commission, and also served as a Human Rights Commissioner on the Northern Ireland Commission for Racial Equality and as Chair of Victim Support. In 1990, she was appointed a CBE.

The Alliance Party of Northern Ireland stood Clark-Glass as their candidate for the Northern Ireland constituency in the European Parliament election in 1994, hoping that she would emulate the success of Mary Robinson in the Irish presidential election in 1990. She took fourth place in the election, making her the best placed candidate not to win a seat, but took only 4.1% of the first preference votes. Following the election, Clark-Glass acted as part of the Alliance's team for the talks which led to the Good Friday Agreement. At the Northern Ireland Forum election of 1996, she was third on the party list in Lagan Valley and eighth on the "top-up" list, but did not come close to being elected.

In 1997, Clark-Glass was appointed to the Commission for Racial Equality. She subsequently ceased political activity, and in 1999 was appointed to the General Medical Council. She also became a member of the Health Professions Council and the General Dental Council.
