= Cornwall and West Plymouth (European Parliament constituency) =

Former European Parliament constituency

- European Parliament constituency
- Boundary within South West England (1994-1999)
- Member state: United Kingdom
- Created: 1994
- Dissolved: 1999
- MEPs: 1

Cornwall and West Plymouth was a European Parliament constituency covering Cornwall and Plymouth in England. With Somerset and North Devon, it was one of the first two seats to elect a Liberal Democrat Member of the European Parliament.

Prior to its uniform adoption of proportional representation in 1999, the United Kingdom used first-past-the-post for the European elections in England, Scotland and Wales. The European Parliament constituencies used under that system were smaller than the later regional constituencies and only had one Member of the European Parliament each.

The seat consisted of the Westminster Parliament constituencies (on their 1983 boundaries) of Falmouth and Camborne, North Cornwall, Plymouth Devonport, Plymouth Drake, St Ives, South East Cornwall and Truro.

Cornwall and West Plymouth was created in 1994 to replace most of Cornwall and Plymouth. It became part of the much larger South West England constituency in 1999.

== Members of the European Parliament ==
Elected	Name	Party
1994	Robin Teverson	Liberal Democrats

== Results ==
European Parliament election, 1994: Cornwall and West Plymouth
Party	Candidate	Votes	%	±%
Liberal Democrats	Robin Teverson	91,113	41.9	
Conservative	Christopher Beazley	61,615	28.3	
Labour	Dorothy Kirk	42,907	19.7	
UKIP	Patricia E. Garnier	6,466	3.0	
Liberal	Paul Holmes	6,414	2.9	
Green	Karen L. Westbrook	4,372	2.0	
Mebyon Kernow	Loveday Jenkin	3,315	1.5	
Natural Law	Francis Lyons	921	0.4	
Subsidiarity	Michael G. Fitzgerald	606	0.3	
Majority		29,498	13.6	
Turnout		217,729	44.9	
Liberal Democrats win (new seat)				
