= Thomas-Everard family =

The Thomas-Everard family are a family of British farmers who became known to the public during the 2001 foot and mouth crisis. The son Guy Thomas-Everard made an impassioned plea against his healthy farm animals being killed as part of a pre-emptive cull designed by the Ministry for Agriculture, Fisheries and Food (MAFF) to save Exmoor animals from foot and mouth disease. The plea and threatened legal challenge was ultimately successful.

The case saw the Thomas-Everard family enter politics, campaigning on rural affairs. The father, Chris Thomas-Everard, is a leading member of the Countryside Party. He stood as the first candidate for the party in the South West England region at the 2004 European election. Thomas-Everard failed to get a seat in the European Parliament, though the party did retain its deposit in the region.

On May 7, 2001, MAFF decided to kill the animals at two farms between Bridgetown and Dulverton because a farm worker on one of the farms had come into contact with the disease at other farms near Taunton. If the two farms became infected they were expected by MAFF officials to act as a "gateway" for the disease to spread from there to the rest of Exmoor. However, vets examined the animals on Thomas-Everard's farm and were happy that they were uninfected. Initially MAFF decided to go ahead with the cull regardless. Thomas-Everard was furious. In an interview with the BBC he said

"All we can do is to try and make MAFF see sense. And stop trying to blackmail us, and stop this bloody nonsense of saying all our neighbours want us culled. It's a bloody lie!"

He blocked the entrance to the farm with a truck and said that he had instructed lawyers to prevent MAFF carrying out the cull. On May 10, following intensive media coverage, MAFF announced that the risk of contraction of disease at the farm had been re-assessed and downgraded. Thus the cull was not carried out.

Guy Thomas-Everard joined a group of farmers, businessmen and media organisations who brought an unsuccessful legal challenge to the government's decision not to hold a public inquiry into the foot and mouth crisis. The Government held three inquiries all of which published its findings publicly, but gathered their information in private.
