= Christina Jordan =

Malaysian-born British politician (born 1962)

Councillor Christina Jordan
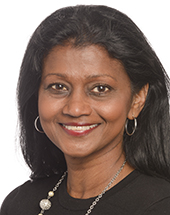

Member of the European Parliament for South West England
- In office 2 July 2019 – 31 January 2020
- Preceded by: Ashley Fox
- Succeeded by: Constituency abolished

Councillor of Basingstoke and Deane Borough Council for Winklebury & Manydown
- Incumbent
- Assumed office 7 May 2026

Personal details
- Born: 19 June 1962 (age 64) Johor Bahru, Federation of Malaya
- Party: Reform UK
- Children: 2
- Occupation: Politician

Christina Sheila Jordan is a Malaysian-born British politician. She served as a Brexit Party Member of the European Parliament (MEP) for South West England from 2019 to 2020. She now serves on Basingstoke and Deane borough council.

== Early life ==
Christina Sheila Jordan was born in Malaysia. She worked as a secretary in the Turkish Embassy in Kuala Lumpur before moving to the United Kingdom (UK) in 1985. She voted for Brexit in the 2016 United Kingdom European Union membership referendum. Prior to her election as an MEP, Jordan worked as a cabin crew member for British Airways for ten years, and trained as a nurse at Royal Hampshire County Hospital, Winchester. For her work with charities in the community, she was given a High Sheriff Award by the High Sheriff of Hampshire, for Services to the Community, and attended the Queen's Garden Party at Buckingham Palace in 2015.

== European Parliament ==
She stood as a candidate in the 2019 European parliamentary election for the Brexit Party. Jordan was third on her party's list, and was elected as one of its three MEPs in the South West England constituency along with Ann Widdecombe and James Glancy. In the European Parliament, Jordan was a member of the Committee on the Environment, Public Health, and Food Safety, and was part of the delegation for relations with India.

== Basingstoke and Deane borough council ==
In the 2026 local elections, Jordan was the Reform candidate Winklebury & Mandydown ward in the 2026 Basingstoke and Deane borough council election, she won and now serves on the council.

== Personal life ==
Jordan is married and has two daughters.
