= Somerset and Dorset West (European Parliament constituency) =

Former European Parliament constituency

- European Parliament constituency
- Boundary within South West England (1984-1994)
- Member state: United Kingdom
- Created: 1984
- Dissolved: 1994
- MEPs: 1

Somerset and Dorset West was a European Parliament constituency covering all of Somerset in England, plus parts of Avon and western Dorset.

Prior to its uniform adoption of proportional representation in 1999, the United Kingdom used first-past-the-post for the European elections in England, Scotland and Wales. The European Parliament constituencies used under that system were smaller than the later regional constituencies and only had one Member of the European Parliament each.

It consisted of the Westminster Parliament constituencies (on their 1983 boundaries) of Bridgwater, Somerton and Frome, Taunton, Wells, West Dorset, Weston-super-Mare, Woodspring, and Yeovil.

The constituency replaced Somerset and parts of Wessex. It was itself replaced by much of Somerset and North Devon and parts of Bristol and Dorset and East Devon in 1994. These seats became part of the much larger South West England constituency in 1999.

== Members of the European Parliament ==
Elected	Name	Party
1984	Margaret Daly	Conservative
1994	Constituency abolished	

== Results ==
European Parliament election, 1984: Somerset and Dorset West
Party	Candidate	Votes	%	±%
Conservative	Margaret Daly	98,928	50.9	
Liberal	Richard Moore	58,677	30.2	
Labour	Jane Linden	38,863	18.9	
Majority		40,251	20.7	
Turnout		196,468	36.0	
Conservative win (new seat)				

European Parliament election, 1989: Somerset and Dorset West
Party	Candidate	Votes	%	±%
Conservative	Margaret Daly	106,716	45.0	−5.9
Green	Richard Lawson	54,496	23.0	New
Labour	Diana Organ	46,210	19.5	+0.6
SLD	Murdoch MacTaggart	28,662	12.1	−18.1
Wessex Regionalist	Anthony Mockler	930	0.4	New
Majority		52,220	22.0	+1.3
Turnout		237,014	40.7	+4.7
Conservative hold		Swing		
