= Opinion polling for the 2019 European Parliament election in the United Kingdom =

Various opinion polls were conducted in advance of the 2019 European Parliament election. Before the April delay, a number of polls asked respondents to imagine how they would vote in a then-hypothetical scenario in which European elections would be held.

== Great Britain ==
=== Graphical summary ===
The chart below depicts opinion polls conducted for the 2019 European Parliament elections in the UK; trendlines are local regressions (LOESS).

==== National opinion polling ====
Pollster/client(s)	Date(s) conducted	Area	Sample size	UKIP	Lab	Con	Green	Lib Dem	SNP	Plaid Cymru	Change UK	Brexit Party	Other	Lead
2019 European Parliament election	23 May 2019	GB	–	3.3%	14.1%	9.1%	12.1% (Note: Including the Scottish Green Party)	20.3%	3.6%	1.0%	3.4%	31.6%	1.6%	11.3%
2019 European Parliament election	23 May 2019	UK	–	3.2%	13.6%	8.8%	11.8% (Note: Including the Scottish Green Party and the Green Party in Northern Ireland)	19.6%	3.5%	1.0%	3.3%	30.5%	4.7%	11.0%
Survation/Daily Mail	22 May 2019	UK	2,029	3%	23%	14%	7%	12%	3%	–	4%	31%	4%	8%
BMG/The Independent	20–22 May 2019	GB	1,601	2%	18%	12%	8%	17%	3%	1%	4%	35%	1%	17%
Ipsos MORI/The Evening Standard	20–22 May 2019	GB	1,527	3%	15%	9%	10%	20%	3%	0%	3%	35%	3%	15%
YouGov/The Times	19–21 May 2019	GB	3,864	3%	13%	7%	12%	19%	3%	1%	4%	37%	2%	18%
Number Cruncher Politics	18–21 May 2019	GB	1,005	2%	19%	15%	7%	16%	4%	1%	4%	33%	1%	14%
Kantar	14–21 May 2019	GB	2,316	4%	24%	13%	8%	15%	3%	0%	5%	27%	1%	3%
Panelbase/The Sunday Times	14–21 May 2019	GB	2,033	3%	25%	12%	7%	15%	4%	–	3%	30%	1%	5%
Opinium	17–20 May 2019	UK	2,005	2%	17%	12%	7%	15%	3%	1%	3%	38%	2%	21%
Survation/Daily Mail	17 May 2019	UK	1,000	3%	24%	14%	4%	12%	4%	1%	3%	30%	4% (Note: Including the DUP with 2% and English Democrats with 1%)	6%
ComRes/Electoral Calculus/Centrum Campaign	13–17 May 2019	GB	4,161	3%	22%	12%	7%	14%	3%	1%	5%	32%	1%	10%
YouGov/Best for Britain/Hope Not Hate	8–17 May 2019	GB	9,260	3%	15%	9%	11%	17%	3%	1%	4%	34%	3%	17%
ComRes/Sunday Mirror/Sunday Express	15–16 May 2019	GB	2,041	2%	23%	9%	9%	16%	4%	1%	4%	31%	1%	8%
Opinium/The Observer	14–16 May 2019	UK	2,009	2%	20%	12%	6%	15%	4%	1%	3%	34%	3%	14%
YouGov/The Times	12–16 May 2019	GB	7,192	3%	15%	9%	10%	16%	3%	1%	5%	35%	3%	19%
Hanbury Strategy/Politico	9–13 May 2019	GB	2,000	3%	25%	13%	6%	14%	4%	–	6%	30%	0%	5%
ComRes/The Daily Telegraph	10–12 May 2019	GB	2,028	3%	25%	15%	7%	13%	3%	0%	6%	27%	1%	2%
Opinium/The Observer	8–10 May 2019	UK	2,004	4%	21%	11%	8%	12%	4%	1%	3%	34%	2%	13%
BMG/The Independent	7–10 May 2019	GB	1,541	3%	22%	12%	10%	19%	2%	0%	4%	26%	1%	4%
ComRes/Brexit Express	9 May 2019	GB	2,034	3%	25%	13%	8%	14%	3%	0%	6%	27%	1%	2%
Survation/Good Morning Britain	8–9 May 2019	UK	1,303	4%	24%	12%	7% (Note: Including the Scottish Green Party with 1%)	11%	4%	1%	4%	30%	3% (Note: Including the DUP with 2%)	6%
YouGov/The Times	8–9 May 2019	GB	2,212	3%	16%	10%	11%	15%	3%	1%	5%	34%	3%	18%
Opinium/People's Vote	3–7 May 2019	UK	2,000	4%	26%	14%	6%	12%	5%	2%	2%	29%	1%	3%
ComRes/Electoral Calculus/Centrum Campaign	1–6 May 2019	GB	4,060	2%	26%	14%	6%	11%	3%	1%	8%	28%	1%	2%
	2 May 2019	Local elections in England and Northern Ireland												
YouGov/The Times	29–30 Apr 2019	GB	1,630	4%	21%	13%	9%	10%	4%		9%	30%	1%	9%
YouGov/Hope Not Hate	23–26 Apr 2019	GB	5,412	5%	22%	13%	10%	7%	5%		10%	28%	1%	6%
Survation	17–25 Apr 2019	UK	1,999	7%	27%	16%	4%	8%	3%	1%	4%	27%	3%	Tie
Panelbase/The Sunday Times	18–24 Apr 2019	GB	2,030	5%	33%	20%	4%	7%	4%	–	5%	20%	1%	13%
Opinium/The Observer	21–23 Apr 2019	UK	2,004	3%	28%	14%	6%	7%	5%	1%	7%	28%	1%	Tie
YouGov/The Times	16–17 Apr 2019	GB	1,755	6%	22%	17%	10%	9%	5%		8%	23%	1%	1%
ComRes/Brexit Express Archived	16 Apr 2019	GB	1,061	5%	33%	18%	5%	9%	4%	0%	9%	17%	1%	15%
YouGov/People's Vote	15–16 Apr 2019	GB	1,855	7%	22%	15%	10%	9%	4%		6%	27%	1%	5%
Opinium/The Observer	9–12 Apr 2019	UK	2,007	13%	29%	17%	6%	10%	6%	1%	4%	12%	2%	12%
YouGov/The Times	10–11 Apr 2019	GB	1,843	14%	24%	16%	8%	8%	6%		7%	15%	1%	8%
Hanbury Strategy/Open Europe Archived	5–8 Apr 2019	GB	2,000	8%	38%	23%	4%	8%	4%	0%	4%	10%	1%	15%
Opinium/The Observer	28–29 Mar 2019	UK	2,008	18%	30%	24%	8%	10%	4%	1%	–	–	5%	6%
	22 Mar 2019	Nigel Farage becomes leader of the Brexit Party												
Opinium/The Observer	12–15 Mar 2019	UK	2,008	17%	29%	28%	6%	11%	4%	1%	–	–	5%	1%
Number Cruncher Politics/Politico	10–17 Jan 2019	UK	1,003	10%	37%	36%	5%	8%	3%	1%	–	–	1%	1%
2014 European Parliament election	22 May 2014	GB	–	27.5%	25.4%	23.9%	7.9%	6.9%	2.5%	0.7%	–	–	5.3%	2.1%
2014 European Parliament election	22 May 2014	UK	–	26.6%	24.4%	23.0%	7.6%	6.6%	2.4%	0.7%	–	–	8.6%	2.2%

==== MRP and RPP estimates ====
ComRes, like YouGov in the 2017 general election, employed multilevel regression with poststratification (MRP) as well as regularised prediction and poststratification (RPP) to model voting behavior in every region in Great Britain using large numbers of survey interviews on voting intentions (an approach described as identifying "patterns in responses across [regions] that have similar characteristics, and then work[ing] out the implications of those patterns for each").

Pollster/client(s)	Date(s) conducted	Area	Sample size	UKIP	Lab	Con	Green	Lib Dem	SNP	Plaid Cymru	Change UK	Brexit Party	Other	Lead
2019 European Parliament election	23 May 2019	GB	–	3.3%	14.1%	9.1%	12.1%	20.3%	3.6%	1.0%	3.4%	31.6%	1.6%	11.3%
2019 European Parliament election	23 May 2019	UK	–	3.2%	13.6%	8.8%	11.8%	19.6%	3.5%	1.0%	3.3%	30.5%	4.7%	11.0%
ComRes/Electoral Calculus/Centrum Campaign (RPP)	13–17 May 2019	GB	3,572	2%	24%	11%	6%	15%	4%		4%	32%	0%	8%
ComRes/Electoral Calculus/Centrum Campaign (MRP)	1–6 May 2019	GB	3,583	3%	27%	14%	6%	11%	4%		8%	26%	0%	1%
2014 European Parliament election	22 May 2014	GB	–	27.5%	25.4%	23.9%	7.9%	6.9%	2.5%	0.7%	–	–	5.3%	2.1%
2014 European Parliament election	22 May 2014	UK	–	26.6%	24.4%	23.0%	7.6%	6.6%	2.4%	0.7%	–	–	8.6%	2.2%

==== London only ====
Pollster/client(s)	Date(s) conducted	Sample size	Lab	Con	UKIP	Green	Lib Dem	Change UK	Brexit Party	Other	Lead
2019 European Parliament election	23 May 2019	–	23.9%	7.9%	2.1%	12.4%	27.2%	5.2%	17.9%	3.3%	3.2%
YouGov/Queen Mary University of London	7–10 May 2019	1,015	24%	10%	1%	14%	17%	7%	20%	5%	4%
2014 European Parliament election	22 May 2014	–	36.7%	22.5%	16.9%	8.9%	6.7%	–	–	8.3%	14.1%

==== Scotland only ====
Pollster/client(s)	Date(s) conducted	Sample size	SNP	Lab	Con	UKIP	Green	Lib Dem	Change UK	Brexit Party	Other	Lead
2019 European Parliament election	23 May 2019	–	37.8%	9.3%	11.6%	1.8%	8.2%	13.9%	1.9%	14.8%	0.5%	23.0%
Panelbase/The Sunday Times	14–17 May 2019	1,021	38%	16%	11%	2%	4%	10%	2%	16%	<1%	22%
YouGov/The Times	24–26 Apr 2019	1,029	40%	14%	10%	3%	7%	6%	6%	13%	0%	26%
Panelbase/The Sunday Times	18–24 Apr 2019	1,018	39%	20%	16%	2%	3%	6%	4%	10%	<1%	19%
2014 European Parliament election	22 May 2014	–	29.0%	25.9%	17.2%	10.5%	8.1%	7.1%	–	–	2.3%	3.1%

==== Wales only ====
Pollster/client(s)	Date(s) conducted	Sample size	Lab	UKIP	Con	Plaid Cymru	Green	Lib Dem	Change UK	Brexit Party	Other	Lead
2019 European Parliament election	23 May 2019	–	15.3%	3.3%	6.5%	19.6%	6.3%	13.6%	2.9%	32.5%	–	12.9%
YouGov/ITV Cymru Wales/Cardiff University	16–20 May 2019	1,009	15%	2%	7%	19%	8%	10%	2%	36%	1%	17%
YouGov/Plaid Cymru	10–15 May 2019	1,113	18%	3%	7%	16%	8%	10%	4%	33%	0%	15%
YouGov/ITV Cymru Wales/Cardiff University	2–5 Apr 2019	1,025	30%	11%	16%	15%	5%	6%	8%	10%	1%	14%
2014 European Parliament election	22 May 2014	–	28.1%	27.6%	17.4%	15.3%	4.5%	3.9%	–	–	3.1%	0.6%

== Northern Ireland ==
The following polls reflect first preferences only.

Pollster/client(s)	Date(s) conducted	Sample size	Sinn Féin	DUP	UUP	SDLP	TUV	Alliance	UKIP	Green	Other	Lead
2019 European Parliament election	23 May 2019	–	22.2%	21.8%	9.3%	13.7%	10.8%	18.5%	0.9%	2.2%	0.6%	0.3%
LucidTalk/The Times/U105	18–19 May 2019	1,482	26.3%	21.8%	11.8%	13.3%	9.3%	11.6%	1.7%	3.3%	0.9% (Note: Includes independent Jane Morrice with 0.7%)	4.5%
LucidTalk/The Times/U105	4–7 May 2019	1,405	27.2%	20.2%	11.8%	13.1%	8.5%	11.3%	1.7%	4.6%	1.6% (Note: Includes independent Jane Morrice with 1.4%)	7.0%
2014 European Parliament election	22 May 2014	–	25.5%	20.9%	13.3%	13.0%	12.1%	7.1%	3.9%	1.7%	2.3%	4.6%
