= Dorset East and Hampshire West (European Parliament constituency) =

Former European Parliament constituency

- European Parliament constituency
- Boundary within South West England (1984–1994)
- Member state: United Kingdom
- Created: 1984
- Dissolved: 1994
- MEPs: 1

Dorset East and Hampshire West was a European Parliament constituency covering most of Dorset and parts of western Hampshire in England.

Prior to its uniform adoption of proportional representation for European elections in 1999, the United Kingdom used first-past-the-post for the elections in England, Scotland and Wales. The European Parliament constituencies used under that system were smaller than the later regional constituencies and only had one Member of the European Parliament each.

The constituency consisted of the Westminster Parliament constituencies of Bournemouth East, Bournemouth West, Christchurch, New Forest, North Dorset, Poole, Romsey and Waterside and South Dorset.

The constituency replaced most of Wessex and parts of Hampshire West. It was itself replaced by much of Dorset and East Devon and parts of Itchen, Test and Avon in 1994. These seats became part of the much larger South West England and South East England constituencies in 1999.

== Members of the European Parliament ==
| Elected | Name | Party |
|---|---|---|
| 1984 | Bryan Cassidy | Conservative |

== Results ==
European Parliament election, 1984: Dorset East and Hampshire West
| Party | Candidate | Votes | % | ±% |
|---|---|---|---|---|
| Conservative | Bryan Cassidy | 109,072 | 57.6 | |
| Liberal | John Goss | 49,181 | 25.9 | |
| Labour | David T. James | 31,223 | 16.5 | |
| Majority | | 59,891 | 31.7 | |
| Turnout | | 189,476 | 33.5 | |
| New creation: Conservative gain. | | Swing | N/A | |

European Parliament election, 1989: Dorset East and Hampshire West
| Party | Candidate | Votes | % | ±% |
|---|---|---|---|---|
| Conservative | Bryan Cassidy | 111,469 | 50.4 | −7.2 |
| Green | Krystyna Bradbury | 49,695 | 22.5 | New |
| Labour | Haydn White | 38,011 | 17.2 | +0.7 |
| SLD | Howard Legg | 21,809 | 9.9 | −16.0 |
| Majority | | 61,774 | 27.9 | −3.8 |
| Turnout | | 229,984 | 36.3 | +2.8 |
| Conservative hold | | Swing | | |
