= Bryan Cassidy =

British politician (1934–2023)

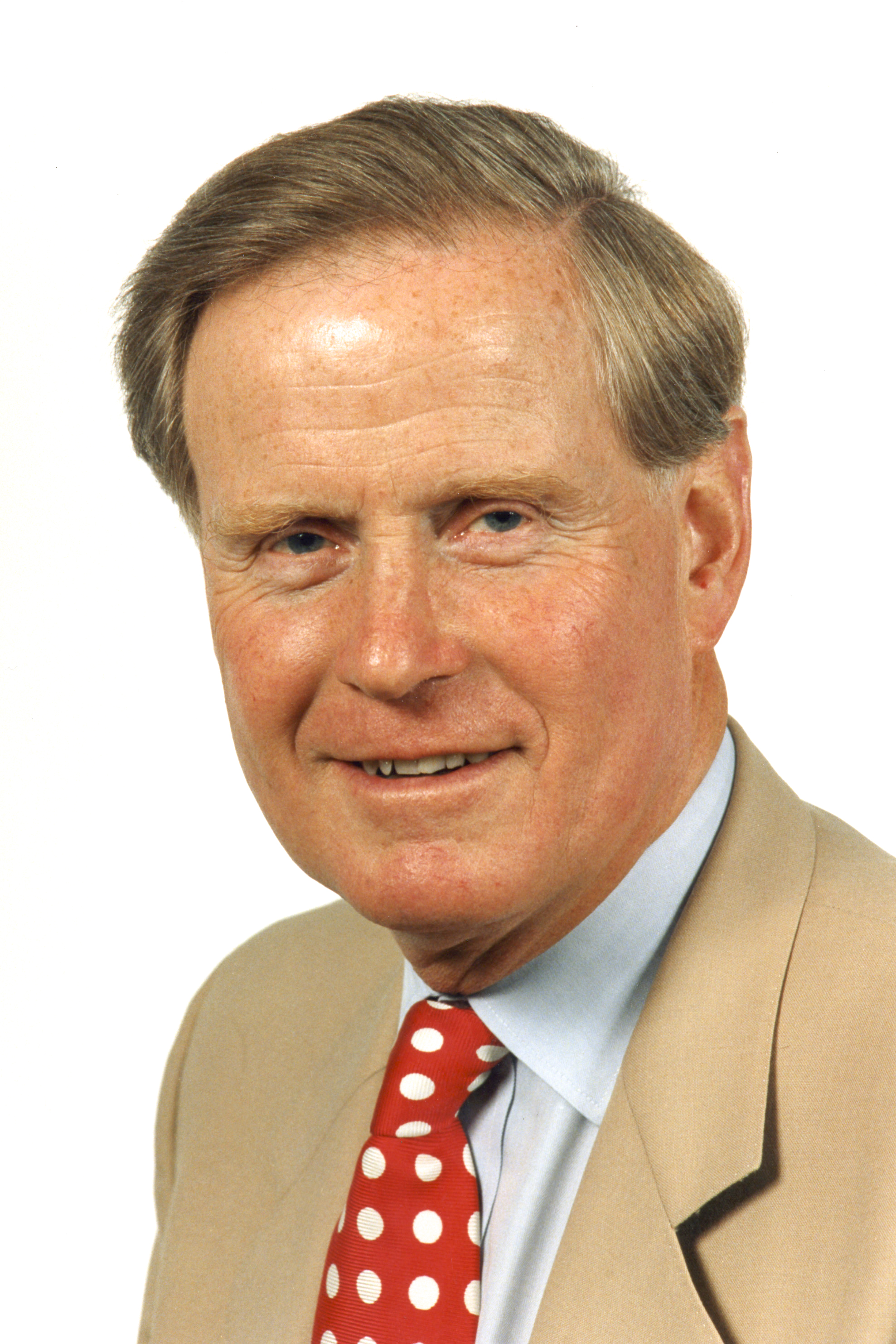
- Cassidy in 1994

Member of the European Parliament
- In office 1984 – 20 July 1999
- Preceded by: Constituency established
- Succeeded by: Constituency abolished
- Constituency: Dorset East and Hampshire West (1984–1994); Dorset and East Devon (1994–1999)

Personal details
- Born: 17 February 1934
- Died: 8 August 2023 (aged 89)
- Party: Conservative
- Education: Ratcliffe College; Sidney Sussex College, Cambridge

Bryan Michael Deece Cassidy (17 February 1934 – 8 August 2023) was a British politician who served in the European Parliament from 1984 to 1999.

== Life and career ==
Bryan Michael Deece Cassidy was born on 17 February 1934. He was educated at Ratcliffe College and then Sidney Sussex College, Cambridge. Cassidy served as director of a trade association, and became active in the Conservative Party, unsuccessfully contesting Wandsworth Central at the 1966 general election. From 1977 until 1986, he served on the Greater London Council, representing Hendon North.

At the 1984 European Parliament election, Cassidy was elected to represent Dorset East and Hampshire West, serving until 1994, when he was elected for Dorset and East Devon. He stood for the enlarged seat of South West England at the 1999 European Parliament election, but was not elected.

Cassidy died on 8 August 2023, at the age of 89.
