= Countryside Party (UK) =

Minor political party in the United Kingdom

- Founder: Jim Crawford
- Registered: 20 May 2000
- Dissolved: July 2008
- Ideology: Opposition to hunting ban
- Political position: Right-wing

Website
- Archived website as of 14 January 2008

The Countryside Party was a minor political party operating in the United Kingdom. It was formed on 22 May 2000 by Jim Crawford, a chiropodist and sport shooter who was the Northern Director of the Countryside Alliance. Much of the party's agenda was the same as that of the Alliance, such as opposition to any restrictions on fox hunting. The party stood unsuccessfully in elections for the UK, Scottish and European parliaments in the early 2000s.

== Platform and membership ==
It was formed out of what it perceived as a lack of understanding or care about rural issues by the mainstream political parties. It was by and large a conservative-minded organisation, and unsuccessfully opposed measures such as the Scottish Land Reform Act which had been designed to give greater rights to tenant farmers and crofters.

According to its 2004 accounts, the party's membership was formally "limited to the two founders, Jim Crawford and Richard Malbon plus a very small number of supporters who are not actually members of the Party".

== Electoral history ==
Crawford contested Ross, Skye and Inverness West, then held by the Liberal Democrat leader Charles Kennedy, for the Countryside Party in the 2001 UK general election. He did not win the seat and achieved less than 1% of the vote.

The Countryside Party stood in the Scottish Parliament 2003 election for the Highlands and Islands electoral region. It polled 1,768 votes (1.05% of the vote in the area).

It contested the 2004 European elections in the South West England and North West England constituencies. In the Southwest, it received 2.1% of the vote which was sufficient to retain its deposit. In the Northwest, it polled only 0.5%. Its relatively good standing in the Southwest may owe something to the notability of its candidates for reasons other than politics. The party's six candidates in the region included Chris Thomas-Everard, whose family became famous during the 2001 foot and mouth crisis for refusing to allow his cows to be culled, Diana Scott, joint master of the Devon and Somerset hunt and a prominent pro-hunting campaigner and the explorer Ranulph Fiennes.

The party was deregistered in July 2008. Crawford, who was later elected as a member of The Highland Council for Inverness South, suggested in 2012 that the party could be reformed to oppose wind farm development. He died in 2020.
