= Margaret Daly =

British politician (born 1938)

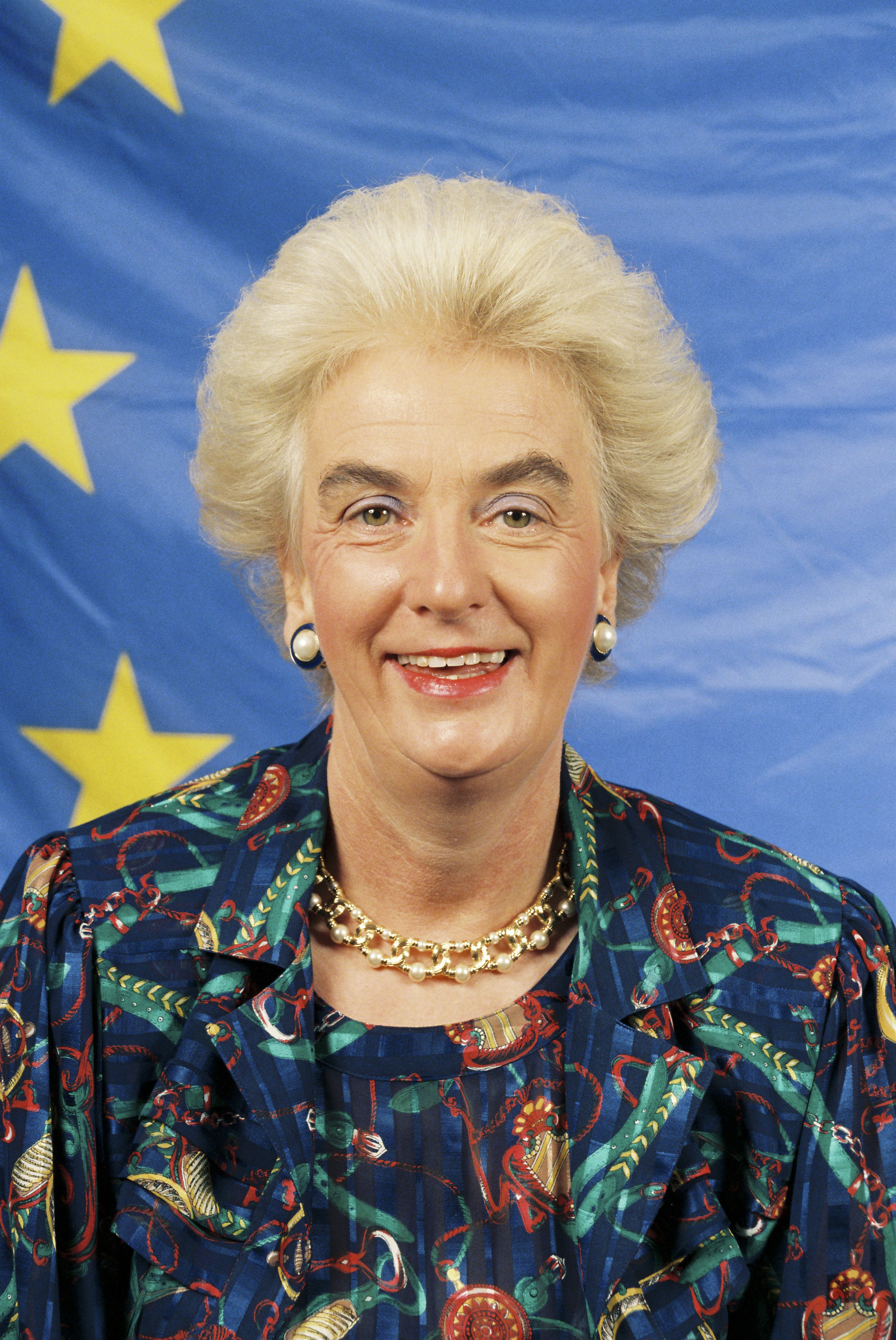

Member of the European Parliament for Somerset and Dorset West
- In office 1984–1994
- Preceded by: Constituency created
- Succeeded by: Constituency abolished
- Majority: 52,000 (1989)

Personal details
- Born: 26 January 1938 (age 88) Belfast, Northern Ireland
- Party: Conservative
- Spouse: Ken Daly

Margaret Daly (born 26 January 1938) is a British Conservative Party politician who represented Somerset and West Dorset in the European Parliament from 1984 to 1994.

== Early life and family ==
Daly was born on 26 January 1938 in Belfast, and had a younger twin brother named Robert. She attended Methodist College Belfast. Her husband, Ken Daly, is a former deputy director of Arms of Industry.

== Political career ==
In the early 1980s, Daly was the director of the Conservative Trade Unionists (CTU), a section of the Conservative Party. She also represented the CTU on the all-party Trade Union committee for Europe, and from 1979 represented the Conservative Party on the European Christian Democratic workers' group (with responsibilities for social policy). After nearly half of Britain's trade unionists voted for the Conservatives in the 1983 general election, Daly observed that trade unionists could no longer "be dismissed as a tool of the Labour party".

Daly entered the European Parliament as the representative for newly created constituency Somerset and Dorset West in 1984, and served two five-year terms. In the 1989 election she received a 52,000 vote majority.

From entering the European Parliament in 1984, Daly served on the Committee on Development and Cooperation. She was elected as vice-chair of this committee in 1987. Daly also served as a member of other committees including Women's Rights (1989–1994), Social Affairs and Employment (1984–1989), Economic and Monetary Affairs and Industrial Policy (1989–1992) and Agriculture, Fisheries and Rural Development (1992–1994).

In 1986, Daly led the European Conservative Group's delegation to the European Community's half-yearly assembly with the African, Caribbean and Pacific states organisation (ACP). At that assembly she tabled resolutions to support a proposal by Henry Plumb to establish a worldwide conference to address the food crisis in Africa and to support Ethiopian refugees in Somalia and Sudan.

In 1988, Daly was vice president of the European Community's Lomé Assembly, which worked to link Community members with former colonies in the ACP countries. In this role she worked to help free Princess Tenagnework, her daughters and daughter-in-law from their 14-year imprisonment without trial after the 1974 Ethiopian Revolution. She was one of the first Westerners to visit them in Addis Ababa after their release, and conveyed a message of thanks from the women to Margaret Thatcher and the British public for their support during the campaign for their freedom.

During her time in office, Daly advocated for increasing the quotas for sugar, rum and bananas being exported by the West Indies to the EU. Her success in doing so and her advocacy for third world countries earned her the public endorsement of West Indies cricketers, Garfield Sobers, Brian Lara and Joel Garner, in the lead up to the 1994 election.

In 1994, the Somerset and Dorset West constituency was abolished and replaced with Somerset and North Devon; she was unsuccessful in seeking election against Liberal Democrat candidate Graham Watson. She attempted to be selected for the 1999 European Parliament election in the United Kingdom but was unsuccessful.
