= Somerset and North Devon (European Parliament constituency) =

Former European Parliament constituency

- European Parliament constituency
- Boundary within South West England (1994-1999)
- Member state: United Kingdom
- Created: 1994
- Dissolved: 1999
- MEPs: 1

Somerset and North Devon was a European Parliament constituency covering all of Somerset in England, plus northern Devon and south-western Avon. With Cornwall and West Plymouth, it was one of the first two seats to elect a Liberal Democrat Member of the European Parliament.

Prior to its uniform adoption of proportional representation in 1999, the United Kingdom used first-past-the-post for the European elections in England, Scotland and Wales. The European Parliament constituencies used under that system were smaller than the later regional constituencies and only had one Member of the European Parliament each.

It consisted of the Westminster Parliament constituencies (on their 1983 boundaries) of Bridgwater, North Devon, Somerton and Frome, Taunton, Wells, Weston-super-Mare, and Yeovil.

The constituency replaced most of Somerset and West Dorset and parts of Devon. It became part of the much larger South West England constituency in 1999.

== Members of the European Parliament ==
Elected	Name	Party
1994	Graham Watson	Liberal Democrats
1999	Constituency abolished: see South West England	

== Results ==
European Parliament election, 1994: Somerset and North Devon
Party	Candidate	Votes	%	±%
Liberal Democrats	Graham Watson	106,187	43.6	
Conservative	Margaret Daly	83,678	34.3	
Labour	John Pilgrim	34,540	14.2	
Green	David Taylor	10,870	4.5	
New Britain	Graham Livings	7,165	2.9	
Natural Law	Mark Lucas	1,200	0.5	
Majority		22,509	9.3	
Turnout		243,640	47.1	
Liberal Democrats win (new seat)				
