= 2019 European Parliament election in the United Kingdom =

- 23 May 2019

All 73 United Kingdom seats in the European Parliament
- Opinion polls
- Registered: 46,550,683 (Note: The number of registered voters included EU nationals who were not eligible to vote in UK general elections)
- Turnout: 17,214,839; 37.2% (▲1.4 pp)
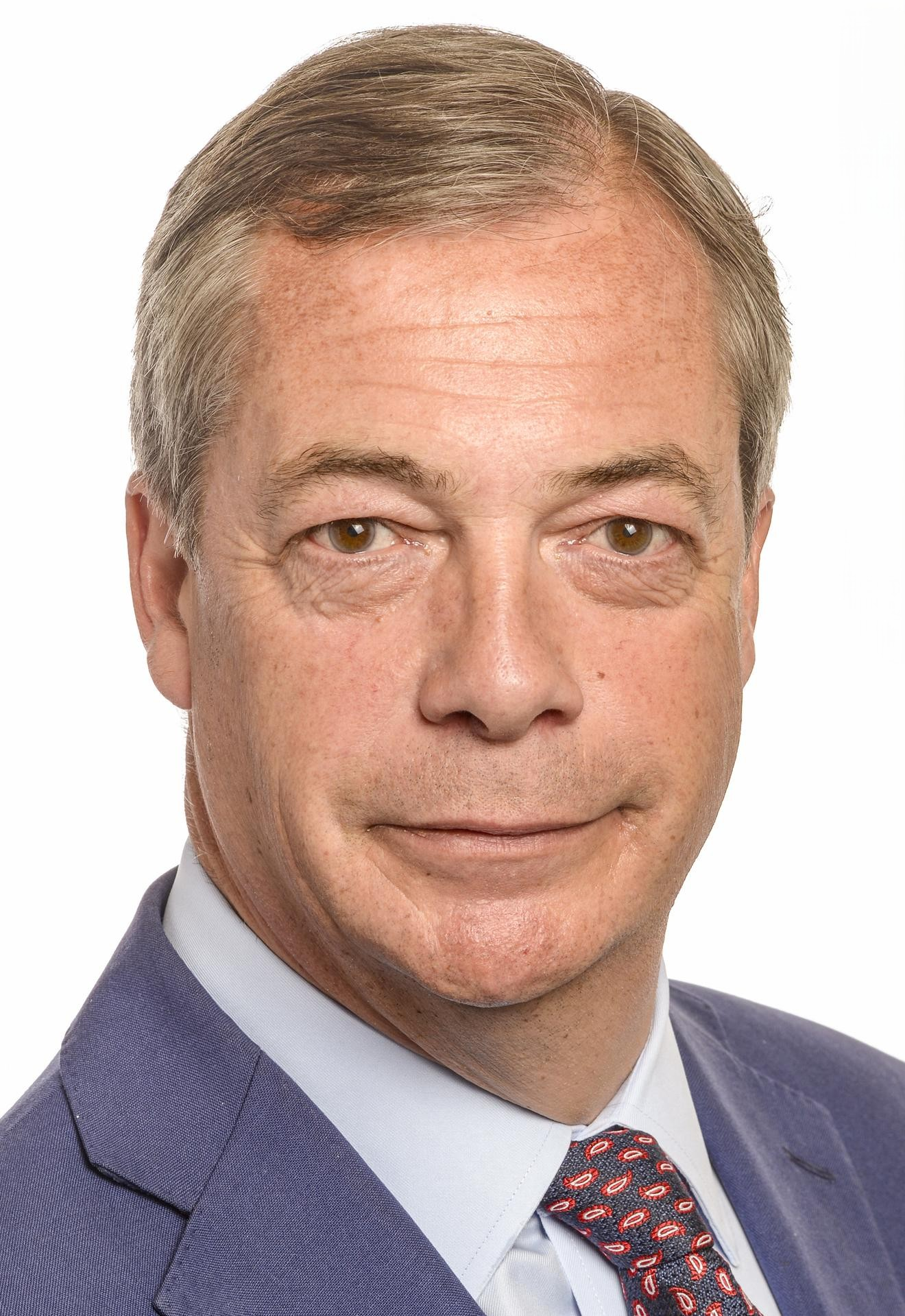

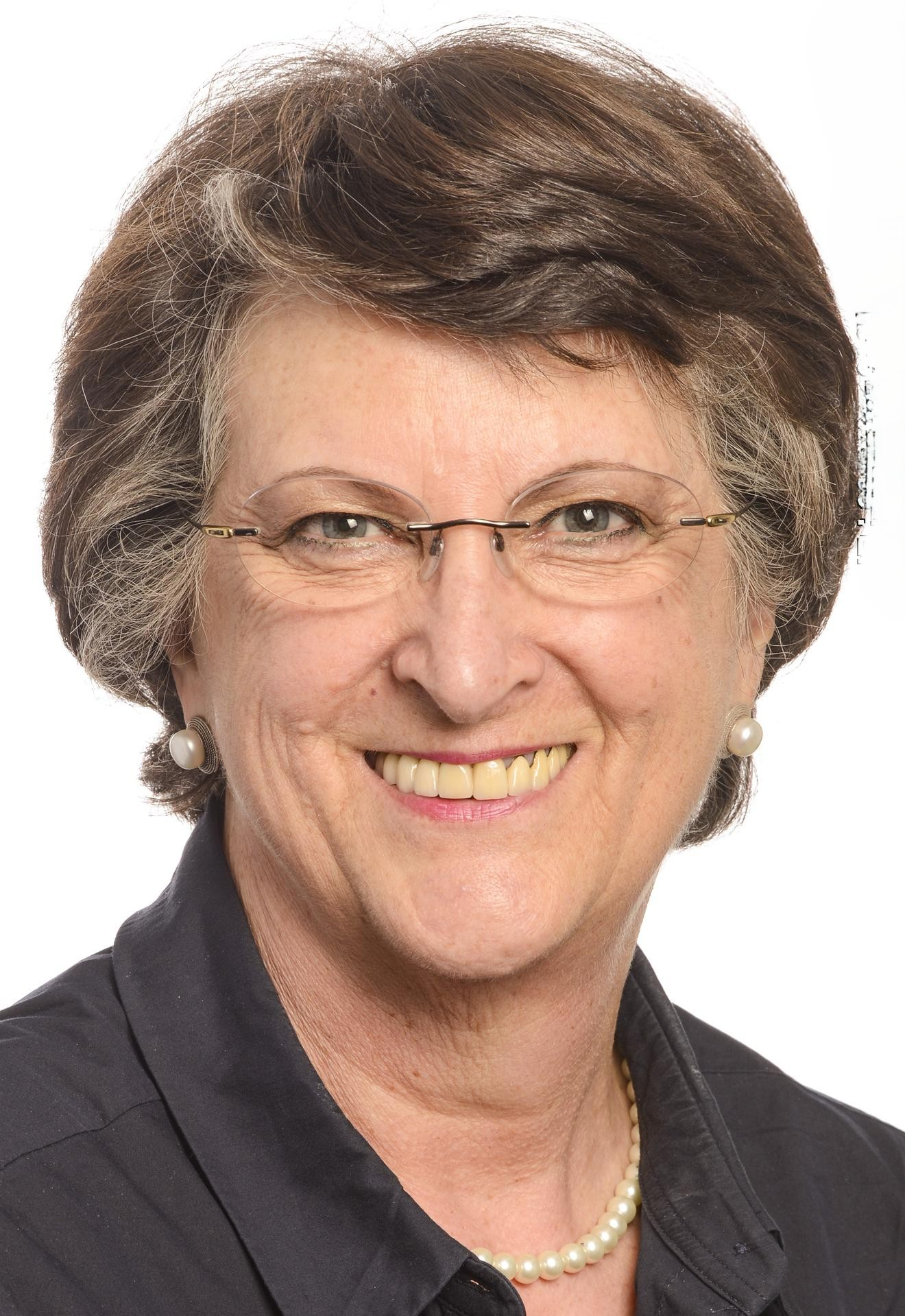

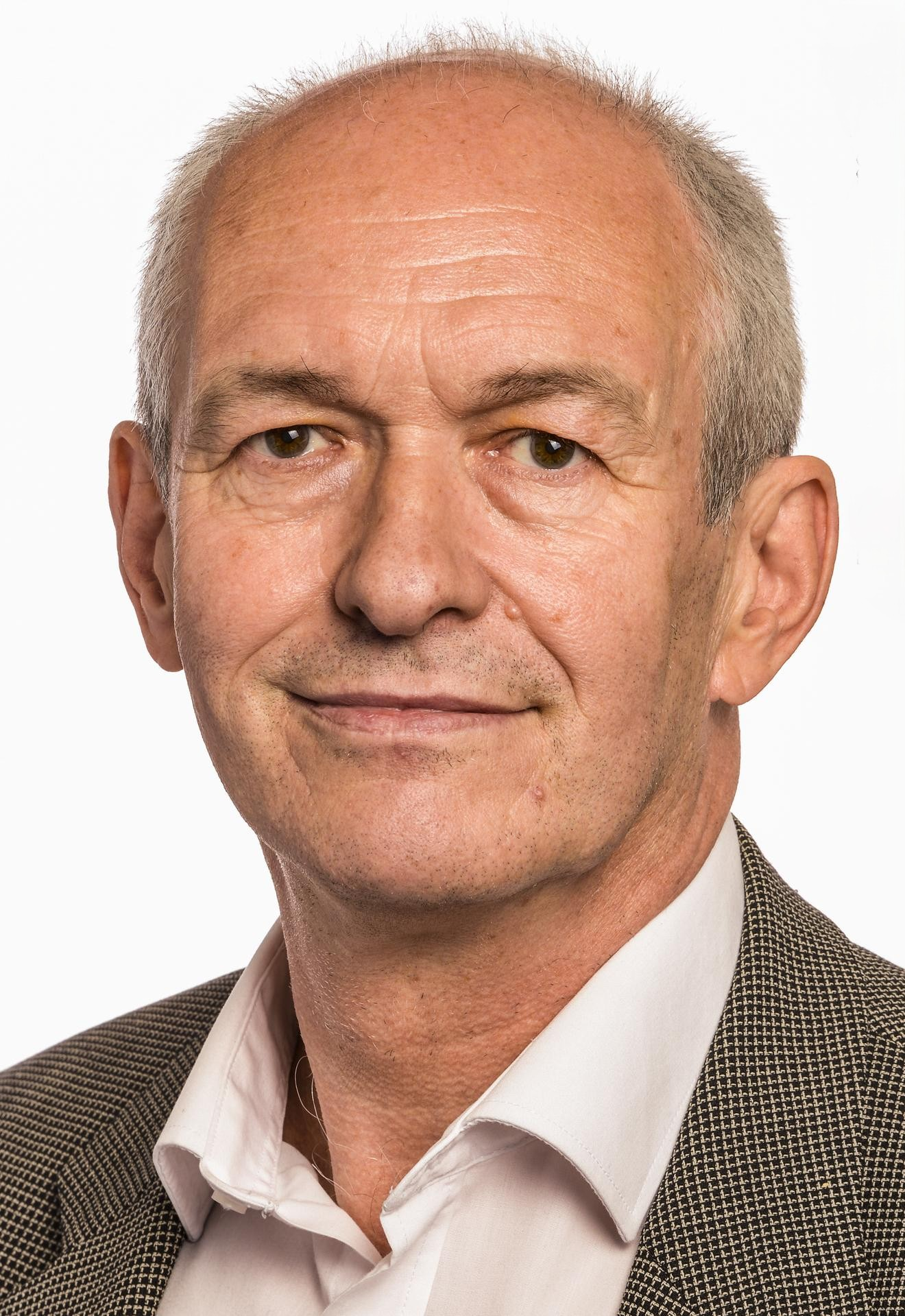

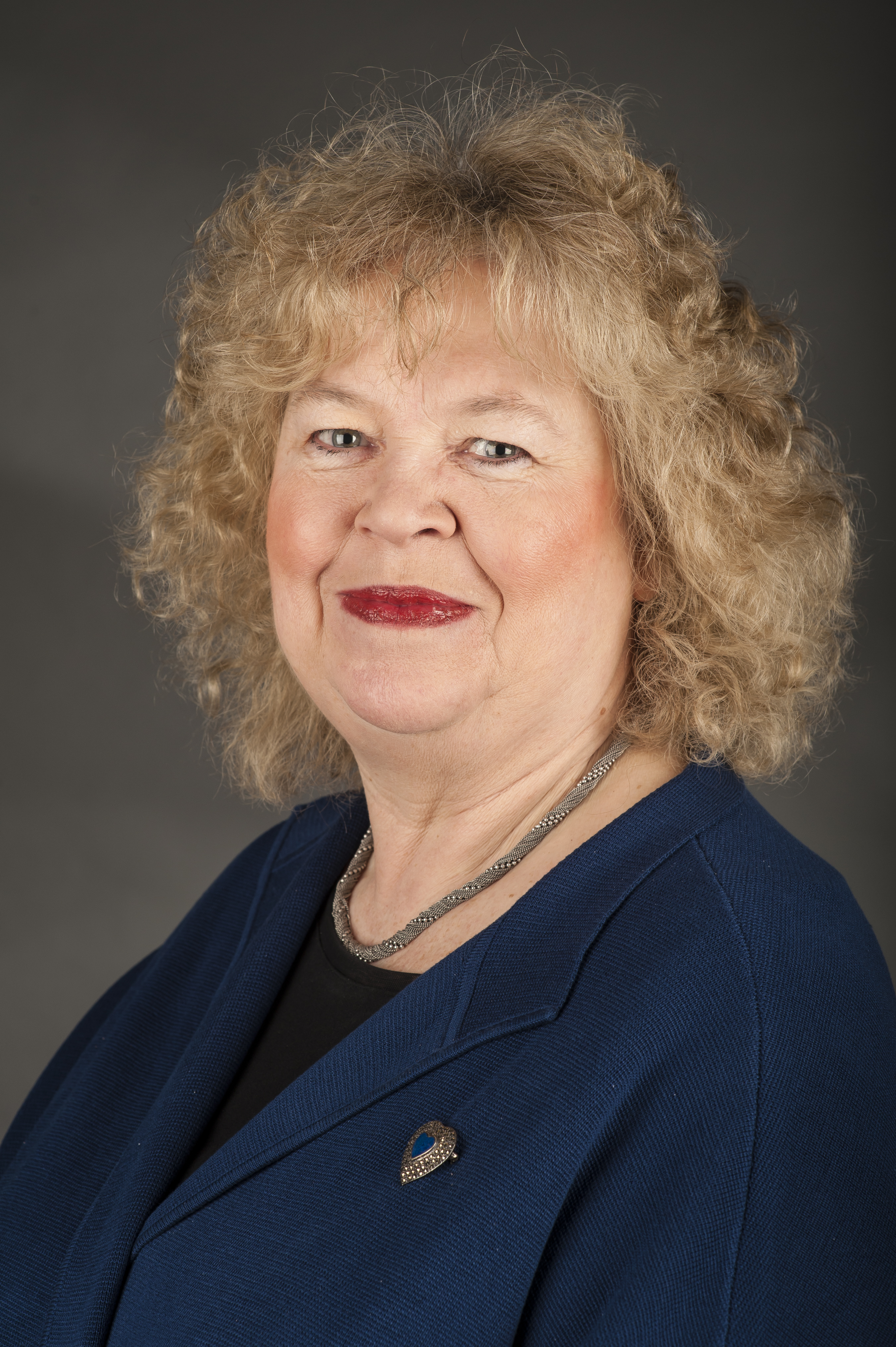

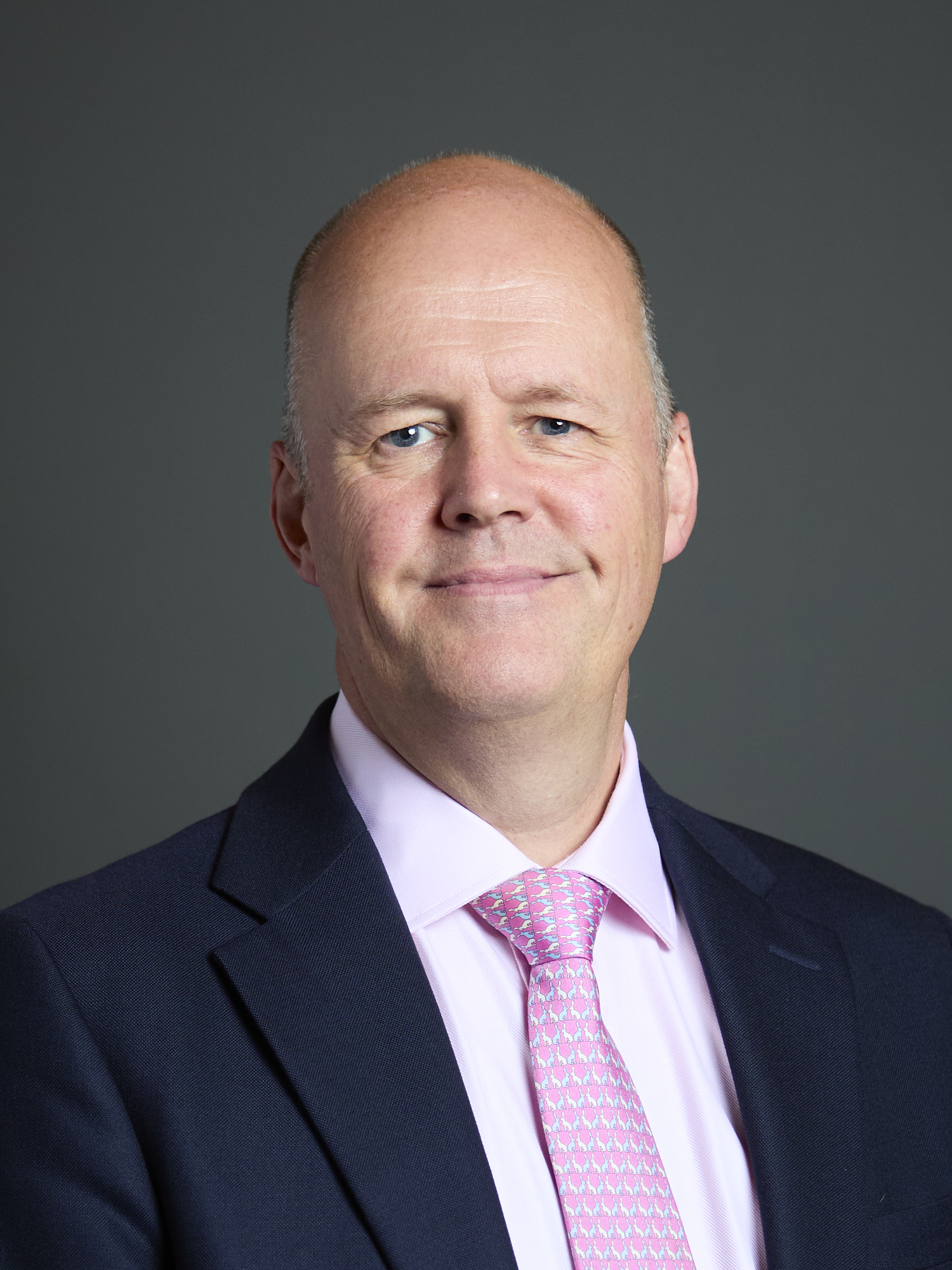

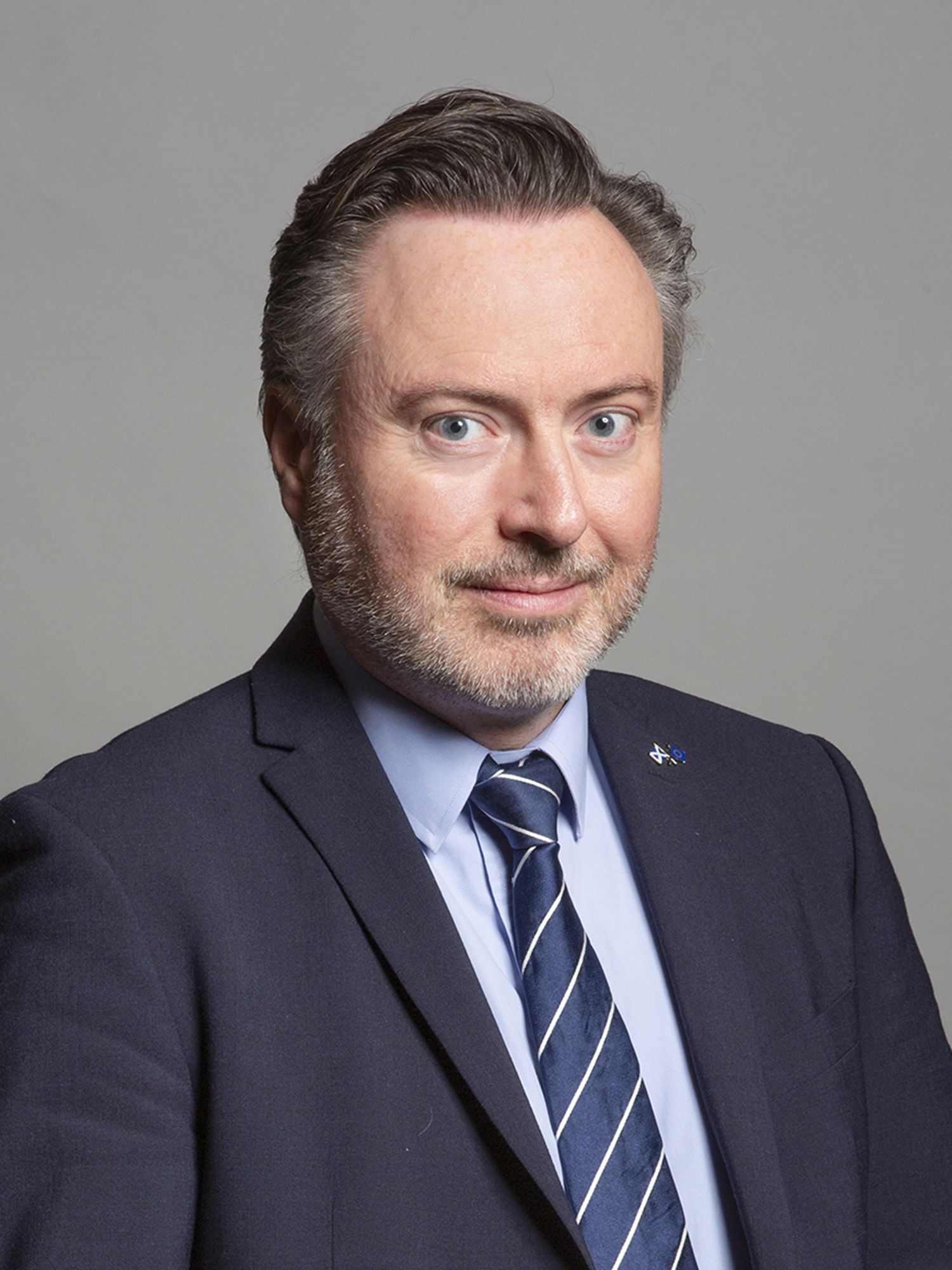
	First party	Second party	Third party
Leader	Nigel Farage	Catherine Bearder	Richard Corbett
Party	Brexit	Liberal Democrats	Labour
Alliance	Non-Inscrits	ALDE	S&D
Leader since	22 March 2019	2 July 2014	25 October 2017
Leader's seat	South East; England	South East England	Yorkshire and the Humber
Last election	Did not contest	1 seat, 6.6%	20 seats, 24.4%
Seats before	14	1	18
Seats won	29	16	10
Seat change	▲29	▲15	▼10
Popular vote	5,248,533	3,367,284	2,347,255
Percentage	30.5%	19.6%	13.6%
Swing	New party	▲13.0 pp	▼10.8 pp
	Fourth party	Fifth party	Sixth party
Leader	Jean Lambert (Note: Lambert was the longest-serving Green MEP.)	Ashley Fox	Alyn Smith (Note: Smith was the SNP's lead candidate.)
Party	Green	Conservative	SNP
Alliance	Greens/EFA	ECR	Greens/EFA
Leader since	6 May 2010	25 November 2014	April 2019
Leader's seat	London (stood down)	South West England (lost seat)	Scotland
Last election	3 seats, 6.9%	19 seats, 23.9%	2 seats, 2.5%
Seats before	3	18	2
Seats won	7	4	3
Seat change	▲4	▼15	▲1
Popular vote	1,881,306	1,512,809	594,553
Percentage	11.8%	8.8%	3.6%
Swing	▲4.9 pp	▼15.1 pp	▲1.1 pp
- Results of the 2019 EU Election in the UK by local authorities.

Leader of Largest Party before election
Gerard Batten
UKIP
Subsequent Leader of Largest Party
Nigel Farage
Brexit Party

The 2019 European Parliament election in the United Kingdom was the United Kingdom's component of the 2019 European Parliament election. It was held on Thursday 23 May 2019 and the results announced on Sunday 26 and Monday 27 May 2019, after all the other EU countries had voted. This was the United Kingdom's final participation in a European Parliament election before leaving the European Union on 31 January 2020; it was also the last election to be held under the provisions of the European Parliamentary Elections Act 2002 before its repeal under the European Union (Withdrawal) Act 2018, and was the first European election in the United Kingdom since 1999 to be held on a day that did not coincide with any local elections. This was the first of two national elections held in the United Kingdom in 2019; the 2019 general election occurred six-and-a-half months later in December 2019.

At first no European Parliament election was planned in the United Kingdom, for Brexit (following the 2016 referendum) was set to take place on 29 March 2019. However, at the European summit on 11 April 2019, the British government and the European Council agreed to delay British withdrawal until 31 October 2019. From that time onward it was the default position in UK and EU law for the election to take place; however, the UK Government continued making attempts to avoid participation by seeking agreement on a withdrawal to take place before 23 May. On 7 May 2019, the UK government conceded, despite its opposition, that the election would have to go ahead.

The election was the ninth time the United Kingdom had elected MEPs to the European Parliament (and the fourth for Gibraltar). Candidate nominations were submitted by 16:00 on 25 April 2019, and voter registration was completed on 7 May 2019. The British MEPs sat until 31 January 2020.

Brexit was the central issue of the election campaign; arguments were made that it was a proxy for a second Brexit referendum. The election was won by the Brexit Party, which won the most votes and became the largest single national party in the European Parliament, being the dominant choice of those who had voted to leave the European Union. The votes of those who had voted to remain were more fragmented: the Liberal Democrats made substantial gains, finishing second nationally, while the Scottish National Party (SNP) and the Green Party of England and Wales also improved on their results from the 2014 election; however, Change UK failed to win any seats. The Conservative Party lost all but four of its MEPs, while the Labour Party too suffered heavy losses. The previously dominant UK Independence Party failed to elect any MEPs.

In Northern Ireland, the Republican pro-Remain Sinn Féin and the Unionist pro-Leave Democratic Unionist Party both held their seats, while the Ulster Unionist Party lost its seat to the pro-Remain non-sectarian Alliance Party. In Scotland, the SNP elected three MEPs, while Labour lost both its MEPs and failed to win a seat in Scotland at a European election for the first time in its history. In Wales, the Brexit Party became the largest party, while the nationalist, pro-Remain Plaid Cymru came second. The Liberal Democrats became the largest party in London.

The election was the first national poll in the United Kingdom since December 1910 in which a successor party to the Liberal Party reached higher than third place in the number of votes or seats, and the first ever national election in which the Conservative Party received less than 10% of the votes cast.

== Voting eligibility ==
To vote in the election, individuals had to be:

- on the Electoral Register;
- aged 18 or over on election day;
- a British, Irish, Commonwealth or European Union citizen;
- resident at an address in the UK, or a British citizen living abroad who has been registered to vote in the UK in the 15 years before the election; (Note: In the case of a British citizen who moved abroad before the age of 18, if a parent or guardian had been on the on Electoral Register in the UK in the 15 years before the election.) and
- not legally excluded from voting (for example, a convicted person detained in prison or a mental hospital, or unlawfully at large if they would otherwise have been detained, or a person found guilty of certain corrupt or illegal practices)

Individuals had to be registered to vote by midnight on 7 May 2019. A person with two homes, such as a university student with a term-time address but living at home during holidays, could be registered to vote at both addresses as long as they are not in the same electoral area, but could vote in only one constituency at the election.

European Union citizens (except for British, Irish, Cypriot and Maltese citizens) also had to submit a European Parliament voter registration form (also known as Form UC1 or Form EC6) by midnight on 7 May 2019 to confirm that they would vote in the European Parliament election only in the UK, and not in their home country. However, in the top 10 local authorities with EU citizens, only 21% of EU citizens who were on the Electoral Register returned this form by the deadline. EU citizens who did not submit this form were unable to vote in the election.

== Constituencies ==
The United Kingdom was divided into 12 multi-member constituencies: the nine regions of England, plus Scotland, Wales and Northern Ireland. Gibraltar was assigned to the South West England constituency. As had been the case since 1999, the English electoral constituencies were based on the government's nine English regions. The seat allocation was the same as in 2014.

The breakdown of seats just prior to the election was:

Party			Faction in European Parliament	
Labour Party	18		Socialists and Democrats	185
Conservative Party	18		European Conservatives and Reformists	74
Brexit Party	14		Europe of Freedom and Direct Democracy	43
Independent	6	3	Europe of Freedom and Direct Democracy	43
Independent	6	1	Europe of Nations and Freedom	36
Independent	6	1	European People's Party	218
Independent	6	1	Non-Inscrits	21
UK Independence Party	3	2	Europe of Nations and Freedom	36
UK Independence Party	3	1	Non-Inscrits	21
Green Party of England and Wales	3		Greens–European Free Alliance	52
Scottish National Party	2		Greens–European Free Alliance	52
Plaid Cymru	1		Greens–European Free Alliance	52
Liberal Democrats	1		Alliance of Liberals and Democrats for Europe	68
Social Democratic Party	1		Europe of Freedom and Direct Democracy	43
Ulster Unionist Party	1		European Conservatives and Reformists	74
Sinn Féin	1		European United Left–Nordic Green Left	52
Democratic Unionist Party	1		Non-Inscrits	21
Change UK	1		European People's Party	218
Vacant	2		Vacant	2
Total	73		Total	750

== Electoral method ==
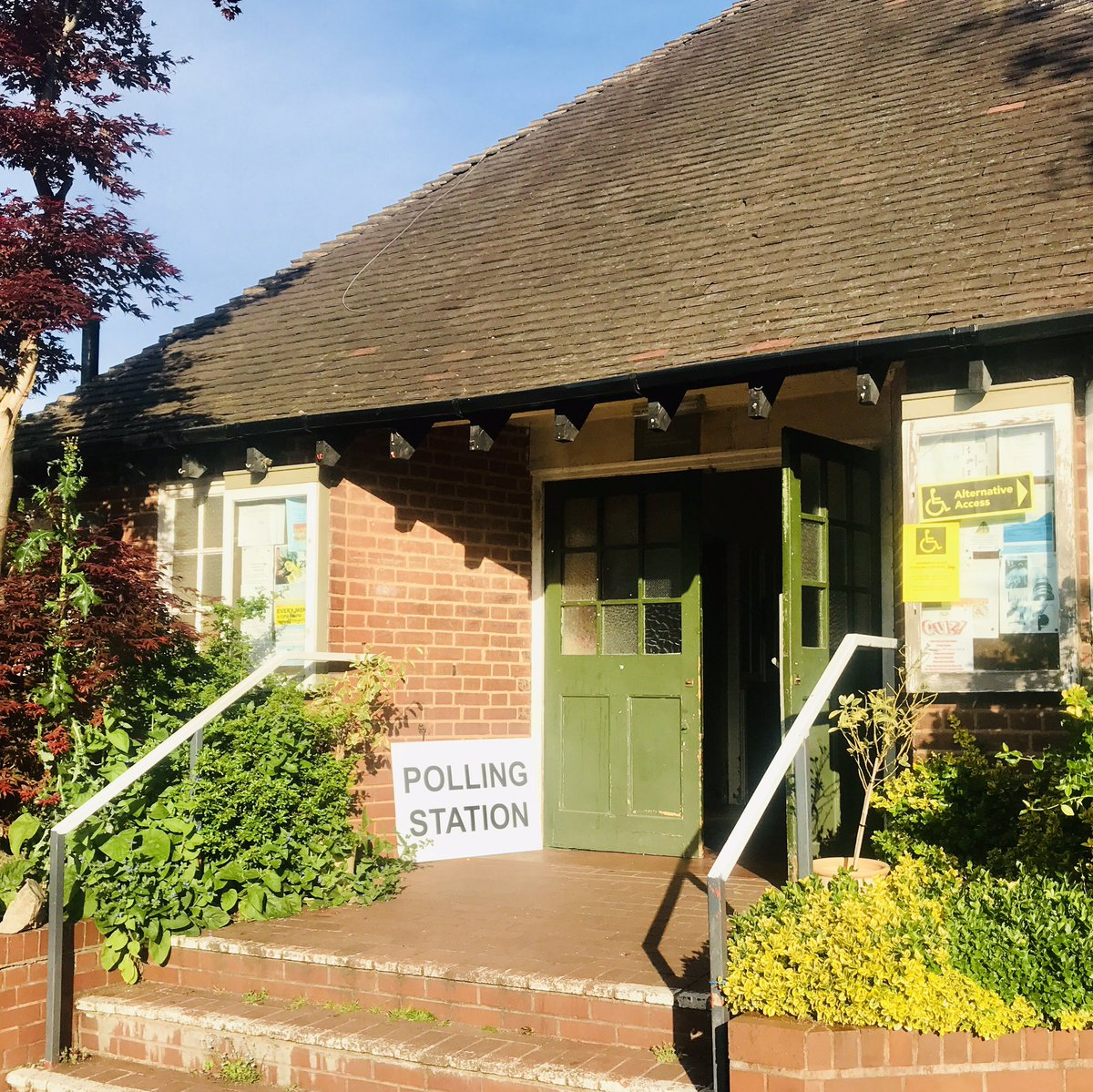
A polling station in Moorpool, Harborne, Birmingham, within the West Midlands constituency on 23 May 2019

In Great Britain, candidates stood on either a party list, known as a closed list, in a set order of priority decided by that party, or as an independent. Voters chose a party (not an individual party candidate) or an independent candidate. Seats would then be allocated proportionally to the share of votes cast for each party or individual candidate in the electoral region using the D'Hondt method of calculation. The first seat was allocated to the party or individual with the highest number of votes. After each seat was allocated to a party, for the purpose of allocating further seats that party's total votes would then be divided by one plus the number of seats already allocated to that party, to give the party's quotient. The second and subsequent seats were allocated in turn to the party or independent candidate with the greatest quotient.

The Northern Ireland constituency used the single transferable vote (STV) system to allocate its three MEPs. Voters ranked the candidates sequentially, in the order of their choice.

== Background ==
=== Expected cancellation and contingency planning ===
The United Kingdom invoked Article 50 of the Treaty on the European Union on 29 March 2017 following a referendum on 23 June 2016 to leave the European Union. As a result, the country was due to leave the EU on 29 March 2019, before the European Parliament elections took place. Nonetheless, on 27 May 2018, it was reported that the UK's Electoral Commission had set aside £829,000 for its "activities relating to a European Parliamentary election in 2019". The Commission described the money as a "precautionary measure, so that we have the necessary funds to deliver our functions at a European Parliamentary election, in the unlikely event that they do go ahead".

The European Parliament resolution of 7 February 2018 on the composition of the European Parliament (2017/2054(INL) – 2017/0900(NLE)) included these clauses:

- H7 refers to the re-allocation of some UK seats following the UK withdrawal from the EU, stating: "Underlines that the seats to be vacated by the United Kingdom upon its withdrawal from the European Union will facilitate the adoption of a new allocation of seats in Parliament, which will implement the principle of degressive proportionality; further underlines that the new allocation proposed would allow for a reduction in the size of Parliament; notes that the use of only a fraction of the seats vacated by the United Kingdom is sufficient to ensure no loss of seats for any Member State".
- H6 has a contingency for the situation that the UK does not leave the EU before the 2019 election, stating that "in case the above mentioned legal situation concerning the United Kingdom’s withdrawal from the European Union changes, the allocation of seats applied during the 2014–2019 parliamentary term should apply until the withdrawal of the United Kingdom from the European Union becomes legally effective".

The European Council also drew up contingency plans allowing the UK to retain its MEPs were Brexit to be postponed:

However, in the event that the United Kingdom is still a Member State of the Union at the beginning of the 2019–2024 parliamentary term, the number of representatives in the European Parliament per Member State taking up office shall be the one provided for in Article 3 of the European Council Decision 2013/312/EU until the withdrawal of the United Kingdom from the Union becomes legally effective.

=== Official preparations ===
After Brexit was delayed beyond its initial planned date of 29 March 2019, the possibility of a sufficiently long delay so as to require the election to take place became more apparent. The period for withdrawal under Article 50 was first extended, with the unanimous approval of the European Council, until 12 April 2019 – the deadline for informing the EU of the intention to hold an election. By early April, the House of Commons had voted again to extend the withdrawal period, and a deadline of 31 October 2019 was agreed between the UK and the Council. The UK Government therefore ordered preparations for the election, with the deadline for candidate nominations on 24 April for the South West England region and 25 April for all other regions.

Nevertheless, ratification of a withdrawal agreement by the UK and European parliaments would still have permitted the UK to leave before October. Had this occurred before 23 May, the United Kingdom and Gibraltar would not have taken part in the 2019 European Parliament elections scheduled for that day. On 7 May, the UK Government announced that it would not be able to obtain ratification in time to prevent the elections, although it still aimed to ratify the withdrawal agreement before October. Later in May, it also acknowledged that the MEPs elected would take up their seats, with Brexit not due to happen until after 2 July.

=== Campaign background ===
The two major UK political parties, the Conservatives and Labour, saw the prospect of elections for the European Parliament (while the UK was due to leave the European Union) as problematic, with both having been keen to avoid this scenario. The backdrop of ongoing debate around Brexit was expected to be a very significant factor in how people voted, with the election seen by many as a "proxy referendum" on whether the country should leave the EU or not. Commentators suggested that the vote share for the Conservatives and Labour could fall, with voters moving towards a number of pro-Leave or pro-Remain parties, and this did indeed happen.

The Conservative government had made several attempts to get the Withdrawal Agreement that it had negotiated with the EU approved by the House of Commons, which would have allowed for Brexit before the election. All these having failed, the Conservatives entered into cross-party talks with the Labour Party to see whether they could agree a withdrawal plan. These talks were still ongoing as of 10 May 2019, but eventually failed.

The election was seen as being significant for two new single-issue parties: the Brexit Party (supporting Brexit), and Change UK (supporting the UK remaining in the EU).

Between the 2014 and 2019 elections, there were many changes to the breakdown of UK members due to defections and changes in affiliation. This table shows the number of MEPs in each party at both ends of the term:

Affiliation	Members		
Affiliation	At 2014 election	At dissolution	Change
Conservative	19	18	▼1
Labour	20	18	▼2
Brexit Party	—N/a	14	▲14
Independent	0	6	▲6
Green	3	3	Steady
UKIP	24	3	▼21
SNP	2	2	Steady
Liberal Democrats	1	1	Steady
Sinn Féin	1	1	Steady
DUP	1	1	Steady
Plaid Cymru	1	1	Steady
UUP	1	1	Steady
SDP	0	1	▲1
Change UK	—N/a	1	▲1
Vacant seats	0	2	▲2
Total	73	73	Steady

== Candidates ==
Nomination papers had to be submitted by 16:00 on the 19th working day before election day (25 April 2019). To stand as a candidate, individuals had to be aged 18 or over on the date of nomination and a British or European Union citizen, or a Commonwealth citizen possessing indefinite leave to remain or not requiring leave to enter or remain in the UK.

In April 2019, the Labour Party said it had begun its process for choosing candidates. 16 of the 20 MEPs elected in 2014 applied to stand again. The party's candidates were announced on 18 April, and included former Cabinet minister Andrew Adonis, former MP Katy Clark and the national co-ordinator of campaigning group Momentum Laura Parker.

Following the prospect of a delay to Brexit, Conservative Party MEPs were asked by their delegation leader if they would consider standing again if there were a delay that would mean the UK staying in the EU beyond the date of the next European Parliament election. Fifteen of the party's 18 MEPs stood again as lead candidates for their respective regions.

The Brexit Party ran candidates for all 70 seats in Great Britain, with leader Nigel Farage, himself a former UKIP leader, standing in the South East England region, and former Conservative candidate Annunziata Rees-Mogg standing in the East Midlands region. Writer Claire Fox, formerly of the Revolutionary Communist Party, and former Conservative MP Ann Widdecombe both also stood.

The UK Independence Party selected its three remaining MEPs as candidates, along with social media activist Carl Benjamin and YouTuber Mark Meechan.

The Green Party of England and Wales and the corresponding party in Scotland, the Scottish Greens, began their candidate selection processes in March. The Green Party of England and Wales announced a full slate of candidates for England and Wales on 24 April 2019, including one of its three outgoing MEPs, Molly Scott Cato. Other candidates included Catherine Rowett, Rupert Read and former Lord Mayor of Sheffield, Magid Magid.

The Liberal Democrats announced their selected candidates for England and Wales on 17 April 2019 following a membership vote. The party's sole incumbent MEP, Catherine Bearder, was re-selected as its lead candidate for South East England, while former MEPs Chris Davies, Fiona Hall, Bill Newton Dunn and Phil Bennion were selected as lead candidates for their respective regions. Other candidates included in London the entrepreneur Dinesh Dhamija and the former leader of the People's Alliance of Tower Hamlets, Rabina Khan, and former MPs Martin Horwood and Stephen Williams in the South West. The party also stood a full slate in Scotland.

Change UK said it had had 3,700 applicants to be candidates, including former MPs from both the Labour Party and the Conservative Party. Its candidates included writer Rachel Johnson (sister of Conservative MP Boris Johnson and formerly of the Liberal Democrats), former BBC journalist Gavin Esler, former Conservative MPs Stephen Dorrell and Neil Carmichael, former Labour MEP Carole Tongue, former Labour MPs Roger Casale and Jon Owen Jones, former Liberal Democrat MEP Diana Wallis, and former deputy Prime Minister of Poland Jacek Rostowski. It stood 70 candidates (all of Great Britain, but not Northern Ireland). Two of its candidates subsequently withdrew from the ballot due to reports that they had made misogynistic and racist remarks.

Jill Evans, Plaid Cymru's sole MEP, stood as the party's lead candidate as part of a full slate for the Wales constituency.

The Women's Equality Party stood in the London constituency, with the party's co-founder Catherine Mayer as the lead candidate.

Far-right activist Tommy Robinson stood as an independent for the North West England constituency.

Further parties and independent candidates also stood, including the English Democrats and the Yorkshire Party.

Nine candidates, seven in London and two in South West England, were part of the new Climate Emergency Independents group. They took part in and were inspired by the Extinction Rebellion protests. However, as they were not a registered political party, they were all listed as separate independents on the ballot paper.

Patrick O'Flynn, the Social Democratic Party's sole MEP, who defected to the SDP after originally being elected for UKIP, stated in April 2019 that the party would not be standing candidates at the election.

=== Northern Ireland ===
Parties with a sitting MEP	European affiliation
Democratic Unionist Party	NI
Sinn Féin	GUE/NGL
Ulster Unionist Party	ECR

Northern Ireland has a different party system to Great Britain, dominated by regional parties, and using single transferable vote rather than the party list system.

Two of the three sitting MEPs contested the election: Martina Anderson for Sinn Féin and Diane Dodds for the Democratic Unionist Party. Jim Nicholson, who had represented the Ulster Unionist Party since 1989, retired, with Danny Kennedy instead running for the party.

Three parties selected their leaders as candidates: Colum Eastwood for the SDLP, Naomi Long for the Alliance Party, and Clare Bailey for the Green Party.

UKIP nominated Robert Hill as their candidate. The Conservative Party also nominated a candidate, making the Conservatives and UKIP the only two parties to stand candidates in all regions across the UK.

In April 2019, Jane Morrice, co-founder of the Northern Ireland Women's Coalition and a former deputy speaker of the Northern Ireland Assembly, announced she was standing as an independent on a pro-Remain platform.

=== Parties in the election ===
Political party	Standing in
Alliance Party	Northern Ireland only
Animal Welfare Party	London only
Brexit Party	All constituencies except Northern Ireland
Change UK	All constituencies except Northern Ireland
Conservative Party	All constituencies
Democratic Unionist Party	Northern Ireland only
English Democrats	East of England, North West England, South West England, Yorkshire and the Humber
Green Party in Northern Ireland	Northern Ireland only
Green Party of England and Wales	England and Wales only
Labour Party	All constituencies except Northern Ireland
Liberal Democrats	All constituencies except Northern Ireland
Plaid Cymru	Wales only
Scottish Green Party	Scotland only
Scottish National Party	Scotland only
Sinn Féin	Northern Ireland only
Social Democratic and Labour Party	Northern Ireland only
Socialist Party of Great Britain	South East England only
Traditional Unionist Voice	Northern Ireland only
UK European Union Party	London, North West England, South East England
UK Independence Party	All constituencies
Ulster Unionist Party	Northern Ireland only
Women's Equality Party	London only
Yorkshire Party	Yorkshire and the Humber only

== Campaign ==
=== Labour ===
In early 2019 there was an ongoing debate within Labour as to what its policy should be with respect to Brexit. On 20 April, the party's deputy leader Tom Watson argued the party needed to back a second referendum on Brexit in order to present a clear alternative to and beat the Brexit Party, but that was not Labour's preferred option. A draft of a Labour leaflet that made no reference to a second referendum provoked a public row, including more than 90 Labour MPs and MEPs writing to the party's National Executive Committee (NEC) in protest. On 27 April, Labour announced that the original leaflet draft was to be redrafted to include details of the party's preparations for a general election, with a referendum if necessary to avoid what it called a "bad Tory deal".

Labour's manifesto for the elections was agreed at an NEC meeting on 30 April, re-affirming its 2018 policy that it will first seek a Brexit deal on its terms (including a Customs union), but if that is not possible, it will seek a general election, and, if that is not possible, a second referendum. Only one vote was held at the meeting, on an amendment from the TSSA union that sought to commit Labour to a referendum on any Brexit deal, but this was rejected by a what NEC sources called a "clear" margin. Retiring Labour MEP Mary Honeyball criticised this as "Not good enough" and some Labour Party members destroyed their membership cards in protest. However, some Remain-supporting Labour MPs, and Labour MPs sceptical of a second referendum, welcomed the decision. Watson had walked out of the Shadow cabinet meeting earlier on 30 April in protest at Shadow Cabinet members not being shown the draft manifesto.

Labour's 9 May campaign launch stressed bringing the country together. Jeremy Corbyn talked of a "healing process" between those who supported Leave and Remain. By mid-May, Watson and Labour's Shadow Brexit Secretary Keir Starmer were arguing for a second referendum, yet their shadow international trade secretary Barry Gardiner stated "Labour is not a Remain party now". In most voting areas, e.g. Scotland and South West England, all Labour candidates stated their support for a second referendum, with the UK's longest-serving MEP, David Martin (Labour) and the Labour Leader in the European Parliament Richard Corbett MEP among those calling for the country to stay in the EU. Polling in mid-May suggested both Labour supporters and the electorate in general were split as to whether Labour supported remaining or leaving the EU.

=== Conservative ===
The Conservative government was hopeful of agreeing a withdrawal deal with the EU soon enough that UK MEPs would not take up their seats. The party did not spend any central money on candidate campaigning, did not publish a manifesto and did not hold a campaign launch. One Conservative MEP said that the deficit of campaigning would be used as an excuse if the party does poorly in the elections. Many party activists were demotivated given the failure of the government to deliver Brexit. Conservative councillors in Derbyshire boycotted the European elections and refused to campaign in protest. A survey of 781 Conservative councillors found that 40% planned to vote for the Brexit Party. Conservative MPs, including Lucy Allan, tweeted positive comments about the Brexit Party. In response, the Conservative Party issued a warning that individuals campaigning for or endorsing other parties will be expelled from the party.

The Prime Minister and leader of the Conservative Party, Theresa May, had announced her intention to resign before the next general election, but further pressure mounted on her to be clear about her timetable for departure, with May meeting the party's 1922 Committee on the matter on 16 May 2019. This resulted in May agreeing to stand down by 30 June 2019. Campaigning by possible successors accelerated after the local elections.

=== UKIP ===
UKIP argued it was "the authentic party of Brexit, the true party of Leave", to quote party leader Gerard Batten. Alongside the Conservatives, UKIP was one of two Brexit-supporting parties fielding a candidate in every region of the United Kingdom, including Northern Ireland. Batten criticised the rival Brexit Party as having no policies. UKIP launched its campaign on 18 April. There was renewed criticism surrounding its candidate Carl Benjamin for telling Labour MP Jess Phillips "I wouldn't even rape you" on Twitter in 2016, and producing a satirical video. Further controversy came when one of UKIP's sitting MEPs, Stuart Agnew, addressed a pro-apartheid club of expatriate South Africans in London that reportedly had links to the far-right.

=== Brexit Party ===
Nigel Farage, the Brexit Party and former UKIP leader, said that there was "no difference between the Brexit party and UKIP in terms of policy, [but] in terms of personnel, there's a vast difference", criticising UKIP's connections to the far right. On 15 April 2019, three more sitting female UKIP MEPs defected to the Brexit Party, criticising UKIP's nomination of Benjamin as a candidate. In particular, Collins noted UKIP leader Gerard Batten's defence of Benjamin's "use of a non-rape threat as 'satire'" to be an especially compelling factor. Two further UKIP MEPs moved to the Brexit Party on 17 April. On 23 April, Farage said that the Brexit Party was not "here just to get a protest vote on 23 May – far from it, 23 May for us is just the beginning". He also argued that the better the performance of the Brexit Party, the lower the chance of a second referendum on Brexit. Farage argued that should the Brexit Party get most votes in the elections, his party should get a seat at the UK/EU negotiations.

=== Liberal Democrats, Green Party and Change UK ===
The three main nationwide pro-European Union parties standing in the election, Liberal Democrats, Greens and Change UK, wished to treat the election as a "soft referendum" on Europe. Commentators such as Marina Hyde raised the concern of a split vote among pro-Remain parties reducing the number of pro-Remain MEPs being elected. Vince Cable, the leader of the Liberal Democrats, proposed standing joint candidates with the Greens and Change UK on a common policy of seeking a second referendum on Brexit, but the other parties rejected the idea. Change UK's co-founder Chuka Umunna confirmed the Lib Dem approach, but he and Change UK interim leader Heidi Allen dismissed concerns of a split Remain vote. Independent MEP Julie Girling, then supporting Change UK, said she had decided not to stand for re-election as a Change UK candidate because of the concern about maximising the Remain vote. On 10 May, she endorsed the Liberal Democrats. Change UK and Girling clarified that she had not been and was not a Change UK MEP, with Girling saying she sat as an independent MEP. On 15 May, David Macdonald, the lead candidate for Change UK in Scotland, switched to endorsing the Liberal Democrats in order not to split the pro-Remain vote. On 22 May, Allen said that she and another Change UK MP, Sarah Wollaston, wanted to advise Remain supporters to vote Liberal Democrat outside of London and South East England, but they were overruled by other party members.

The Greens said that joint lists were not "desirable" and that there were "fundamental ideological differences" on other issues between the parties that wanted a second referendum. The Green Party campaigned on a platform calling for action on climate change as well as an anti-Brexit platform.

The Liberal Democrats ran on a "stop Brexit" message, seeking the support of those who wanted the UK to remain in the EU. At his party's campaign launch on 26 April, Cable lamented that it was not standing on a common platform with other parties opposed to Brexit. It launched its manifesto on 9 May, unveiling its campaign slogan "Bollocks to Brexit," which attracted considerable media debate. Polling in the final fortnight put the Liberal Democrats ahead of the other pro-Remain parties and overtaking Labour in some polls.

Change UK (which in early April was still known as the Independent Group) saw the election as an important launchpad for its new party, seeking to turn the ballot into a "proxy referendum" on Brexit. On 16 April 2019, two former Conservative MEPs, who had left the party to sit as independents within the European People's Party grouping, announced their support for Change UK. The Renew Party agreed to support Change UK at the elections, and the latter included candidates from Renew's approved list. Molly Scott Cato, a sitting MEP for the Green Party of England and Wales, criticised Change UK as "a single-issue party with no coherent policy platform beyond opposing Brexit".

=== Other parties ===
The SNP campaign launch was marred by tens of thousands of personalised letters being sent to the wrong people. The mistake was reported to be in the data supplied by SNP HQ, run by Peter Murrell, husband of SNP leader Nicola Sturgeon. The party apologised for the error: the party referred itself to the Information Commissioner's Office and might have been fined, but was cleared of breaching data protection regulations.

The DUP campaigned on sending a message to "get on with Brexit".

=== Later events ===
Local elections were held in most of England and all of Northern Ireland on 2 May. The results saw both Conservatives and Labour losing seats in what The Guardian called a "Brexit backlash" while the Liberal Democrats, Greens and independents made gains. The Liberal Democrats made the biggest gains which the Lib Dem leader Vince Cable put down to a rejection of the Conservatives and Labour over their Brexit approaches. Stephen Bush, writing in the New Statesman, argued that the Lib Dem success in the local elections make it the most likely party for Remain voters to rally around at the European elections while James Moore in The Independent described them as having the "momentum" leading into the European elections. Alliance (the Lib Dems' sister party in Northern Ireland), other smaller parties and independents also made significant gains in the local elections in Northern Ireland.

On 18 May, former Conservative Deputy Prime Minister and sitting Conservative peer Michael Heseltine said he would vote for the Liberal Democrats instead of the Conservatives because of his own party's support for Brexit. Heseltine subsequently had the Conservative whip suspended, owing to his comments.

Polling after the local elections saw the Brexit Party in front, followed by Labour, with the Liberal Democrats taking third from the Conservatives. Conservative sources predicted the party could come even lower than fourth. By the weekend before the vote, the Labour Party was concerned at the increased polling for the Liberal Democrats, which came above Labour in London and in some national polls.

On 17 May, Labour left talks that had been held to find a Brexit deal with the Conservative government. May then proposed to bring a new deal to the House of Commons for a vote in early June, which she described as an "improved package of measures", after which she was expected to step down as Prime Minister and leader of the Conservative Party.

The campaign saw multiple cases of milkshakes being thrown at controversial MEP candidates on the right. The protests began against Carl Benjamin, the anti-feminist social media activist who had attracted controversy for jokes about rape, and activist Tommy Robinson. They later extended to Nigel Farage, leader of the Brexit Party. Police asked a Scottish fast food outlet, near where a Farage rally was to take place, not to sell milkshakes on the night of the event.

On 21 May, the Prime Minister and Leader of the Conservative Party, Theresa May made a speech outlining her plan to introduce an EU withdrawal agreement bill in June that would allow the Commons to make amendments, e.g. in favour of a Customs Union or a second referendum, but this was received badly by much of her own party as well as by other parties. There were growing calls for her to resign on 22 May, the day before the election. Andrea Leadsom, the Leader of the House of Commons, resigned on the evening of 22 May. May had planned to publish the bill on Friday 24 May, but on polling day, she abandoned that plan, with publication delayed until early June. On the day after the vote, May announced that she would resign as party leader on 7 June.

There were several reports on the day of problems encountered by non-UK UK-resident EU citizens not being able to vote because their paperwork had not been processed in time, with opposition politicians raising concerns as to whether there had been systemic failures. At least three councils admitted that the compressed timescale of the election meant that they had not been able to send postal ballots out in time for some voters overseas. A report by The Guardian after the election found that in many parts of the country there were low levels of completion of UC1 forms, required by UK-resident EU citizens in order for them to vote in the UK. After the election, the European Commission complained to the UK government about the "obstacles" faced by EU citizens in voting. A month later, the Dutch Interior Ministry stated that almost half the local UK registration officials had failed to send the UC1 data to the Dutch authorities, and that a portion of the data sent was unusable, despite complaints by the Dutch government about similar issues in 2014.

=== Between the vote and the count ===
Because results could not be announced until the last European Union member country's polls had closed, and most countries in the EU voted on Sunday, the counting of UK ballots started on Sunday 26 May 2019.

Within a day of the polls closing, two party leaders and one deputy party leader announced their plans to resign. On 24 May, Theresa May announced her plan to resign as leader of the Conservative Party on 7 June, which would trigger a leadership contest. On the same day, Mike Hookem resigned as deputy leader of UKIP in order to challenge for the leadership. Vince Cable, leader of the Liberal Democrats, had previously stated his intention to stand down after the local elections and European Parliament elections. The party's leadership contest officially started on 24 May.

Two Labour politicians announced their departures from the party after the vote: departing MEP Mary Honeyball and former Welsh AM Leighton Andrews; Andrews said he had voted Green. Both criticised Labour over alleged antisemitism and their failure to oppose Brexit. Alastair Campbell, formerly Director of Communications for the Labour Party, said he had voted for a pro-Remain party, the first time in his life he had not voted Labour. He later revealed that he voted for the Liberal Democrats and was expelled from the Labour Party.

=== Party Brexit positions ===
Party	Brexit position	Withdrawal agreement position	Manifesto Position	Details
Labour	Ambiguous	Opposed	Deal with EU	In favour of a permanent customs union with the EU. If it could not obtain agreement on its Brexit plan or an early general election, the party supported "the option of a public vote".
Conservative	Leave	Supported	Deal with EU	In favour of leaving the EU with the withdrawal agreement negotiated by the current Conservative government.
Brexit Party	Leave	Opposed	No deal Brexit	In favour of "no deal" Brexit; opposed a customs union or membership of the single market.
UKIP	Leave	Opposed	No deal Brexit	In favour of "no deal" Brexit without a formal withdrawal agreement.
Green (E&W)	Remain	Opposed	Second referendum	In favour of a second referendum.
SNP	Remain	Opposed	Second referendum	In favour of Scotland remaining in the single market and customs union. Supported a second referendum and an independent Scotland within the EU.
Liberal Democrats	Remain	Opposed	Revoke Article 50 to Stop Brexit	Sought to stop Brexit. In favour of a second referendum, in which they would campaign for Remain.
Democratic Unionist	Leave	Opposed	Deal with EU	Concerns over a perceived risk to Northern Ireland's position in the United Kingdom due to the Irish border "backstop" issue.
Plaid Cymru	Remain	Opposed	Second referendum	In favour of a second referendum, and potentially of an independence referendum for Wales if Brexit were to occur without continued membership of single market.
Sinn Féin	Remain	Supported		In favour of "designated special status" for Northern Ireland remaining in the EU. Supported a border poll on Northern Ireland uniting with Ireland in the event of "no deal" Brexit.
Ulster Unionist Party	Ambiguous	Opposed	Deal with EU	Concerns based over the Northern Irish "backstop" issue.
Change UK	Remain	Opposed	Second referendum	In favour of a second referendum, in which it would campaign for Remain.

Among other parties, the SDLP opposed Brexit and supported a second referendum, but it supported the withdrawal agreement if Brexit is to take place. The Alliance Party opposed Brexit, while TUV supported it.

== Debates ==
A livestreamed debate was held by The Daily Telegraph between Nigel Farage, leader of the Brexit Party, and Vince Cable, leader of the Liberal Democrats.

A debate was held by the BBC in Northern Ireland, with candidates of the main regional parties represented. The BBC also held a debate between the lead candidates of all parties standing in Wales.

== Endorsements ==
=== Newspapers ===
Newspaper	Endorsement
Daily Mail	Conservative Party, Brexit Party in strategic electorates
Evening Standard	Liberal Democrats
The Guardian	Pro-EU candidates
The News Letter (Belfast)	Unionist candidates
The New Worker	No endorsement; encouraged a boycott
The Observer	Pro-EU candidates
Socialist Worker	Labour Party
Sunday Mail (Scotland)	Scottish Green Party
Sunday Mirror	Labour Party

== Opinion polls ==
The chart below depicts opinion polls conducted in Great Britain for the 2019 European Parliament elections in the UK; trendlines are local regressions (LOESS). There was regular polling from mid-March. The share for the Brexit Party rose rapidly, and it led the polls from late April. The share for the Labour Party declined over the period, but they came second in most polls. Polling for the Liberal Democrats started rising towards the end of April, with most polls predicting they would come third. Polling for the Conservative Party fell over the period, with most polls predicting it would come fourth.

== Results ==
Results were declared for Wales and most of England on Sunday evening, with results for the rest of England and for Scotland coming on Monday. Results for Northern Ireland were clear by the end of Monday.

=== United Kingdom results ===
Party	Alliance	Votes			Seats		
Party	Alliance	Number	%	+/−	Seats	+/−	%
Brexit Party	NI	5,248,533	30.5	new party	29	new party	39.7
Liberal Democrats	ALDE	3,367,284	19.6	▲13.0	16	▲15	21.9
Labour Party	S&D	2,347,255	13.7	▼10.8	10	▼10	13.7
Green Party of England and Wales	G/EFA	1,881,306	11.8	▲4.0	7	▲4	9.6
Conservative Party	ECR	1,512,809	8.8	▼14.3	4	▼15	5.5
Scottish National Party	G/EFA	594,553	3.5	▲1.1	3	▲1	4.1
Plaid Cymru	G/EFA	163,928	1.0	▲0.3	1	Steady	1.4
Sinn Féin	GUE/NGL	126,951	0.7	▼0.2	1	Steady	1.4
Democratic Unionist Party	NI	124,991	0.7	▼0.1	1	Steady	1.4
Alliance Party of Northern Ireland	ALDE	105,928	0.6	▲0.3	1	▲1	1.4
Change UK	EPP (Note: Change UK's sole MEP before the election, Richard Ashworth, was a member of the EPP group.)	571,846	3.3	new party	0	new party	0
UK Independence Party	—N/a	554,463	3.2	▼23.4	0	▼24	0
Scottish Greens	G/EFA	129,603	0.8	▲0.1	0	Steady	0
Social Democratic and Labour Party	S&D	78,589	0.5	▼0.0	0	Steady	0
Traditional Unionist Voice	NI	62,021	0.4	▼0.1	0	Steady	0
Ulster Unionist Party	ECR	53,052	0.3	▼0.2	0	▼1	0
Yorkshire Party	G/EFA	50,842	0.3	▲0.2	0	Steady	0
English Democrats	—N/a	39,938	0.2	▼0.6	0	Steady	0
UK European Union Party	—N/a	33,576	0.2	new party	0	new party	0
Animal Welfare Party	APEU	25,232	0.2	▲0.0	0	Steady	0
Women's Equality Party	—N/a	23,766	0.1	new party	0	new party	0
Green Party Northern Ireland	G/EFA	12,471	0.1	▲0.0	0	Steady	0
Independent Network	—N/a	7,641	<0.1	new party	0	Steady	0
Socialist Party of Great Britain	—N/a	3,505	<0.1	▲0.0	0	Steady	0
Independent	—N/a	80,280	0.5	▲0.5	0	Steady	0
Valid Votes	17,199,701	99.92			73	Steady	0
Rejected Votes	15,138	0.08					
Overall turnout	17,214,839	37.18	▲1.4				
Registered voters	46,550,683						

=== Results by constituency and local areas ===
Constituency	Elected MEPs									
East Midlands	Brx	Brx	Brx	LD	Lab					
East of England	Brx	Brx	Brx	LD	LD	Grn	Con			
London	LD	LD	LD	Lab	Lab	Brx	Brx	Grn		
North East England	Brx	Brx	Lab							
North West England	Brx	Brx	Brx	Lab	Lab	LD	LD	Grn		
South East England	Brx	Brx	Brx	Brx	LD	LD	LD	Grn	Con	Lab
South West England	Brx	Brx	Brx	LD	LD	Grn				
West Midlands	Brx	Brx	Brx	Lab	LD	Grn	Con			
Yorkshire and the Humber	Brx	Brx	Brx	Lab	LD	Grn				
Scotland	SNP	SNP	SNP	Brx	LD	Con				
Wales	Brx	Brx	PC	Lab						
Northern Ireland	SF	APNI	DUP							

=== Vote share by constituency (GB only) ===
Percentage shares of the votes cast
Party	East Midlands	East of England	London	North East England	North West England	South East England	South West England	West Midlands	Yorkshire and the Humber	Scotland	Wales
Brexit	38.2	37.8	17.9	38.7	31.2	36.1	36.7	37.7	36.5	14.8	32.5
Liberal Democrats	17.2	22.6	27.2	16.8	17.2	25.8	23.1	16.3	15.5	13.8	13.6
Labour	13.9	8.7	23.9	19.4	21.9	7.3	6.5	17.0	16.3	9.3	15.3
Green	10.5	12.7	12.5	8.1	12.5	13.5	18.1	10.7	13.0	8.2	6.3
Conservative	10.7	10.3	7.8	6.8	7.6	10.3	8.7	10.0	7.2	11.6	6.5
SNP										37.8	
Plaid Cymru											19.6

=== Analysis ===
Estimated results of the 2019 European Parliament election for House of Commons constituencies in Great Britain. Dr. Chris Hanretty, a Reader in Politics at the University of East Anglia, estimated through a demographic model the most likely result by parliamentary constituency should it be repeated at a general election, concluding that the Brexit Party would have won a majority with 414 seats.

The Brexit Party was the largest party, gaining five more seats than UKIP achieved in 2014. Nigel Farage, as leader of UKIP in 2014 and the Brexit Party in 2019, became the first person to lead two different parties that topped a national election. The Brexit party came first in Wales and in eight of the nine English constituencies. It finished third in London. The Brexit Party polled highest in regions that voted Leave in the Brexit referendum.

The Liberal Democrats came second. This was its best performance in a national election since the 2010 general election and its best ever in a European Parliament election. This was the first time it or its predecessor parties had come second in a national election since before the Second World War. It was the largest party in the London constituency, the largest party in the second-highest number of English reporting areas, and the only party other than the SNP to top any Scottish reporting area.

The Labour Party was third overall. It did not come first in any constituency. This was its worst result in Wales for nearly a century; it did not come first in any reporting area in Wales or Scotland. Labour's vote fell in both Remain and Leave areas.

The Greens came fourth, with their best performance since the 1989 European elections. The Green Party of England and Wales was the largest party in three reporting areas.

The Conservative Party came fifth, and was not the largest party in any reporting area, polling below 10% for the first time in the party's history. It lost votes across the country, but did worst in Remain areas. The combined share for Labour and the Conservatives was 23%, well below their previous (post-Second World War) low of 43.5% in 2009.

The SNP came sixth overall but first in the single Scottish constituency, the only one in which it stood candidates. It was the largest party in 30 of the 32 Scottish council areas.

Plaid Cymru came second in Wales behind the Brexit Party, marking the first time it had beaten Labour in any Wales-wide election. The closest result across the UK was in Wales, where the Liberal Democrats were 13,948 votes (1.7%) behind Labour for the last MEP.

In Northern Ireland, the three MEPs elected were from the Democratic Unionist Party, which advocates the continuation of the union with Great Britain, Sinn Féin, which campaigns for a united Ireland, and the cross-community Alliance Party. The latter two were opposed to Brexit. It was the first time that unionists had won fewer than two of the three seats, and the first time that all three MEPs were women. The Alliance success was noted as an indicator for the rise of the "Others", who identify neither as Unionist nor Nationalist.

Various analyses sought to combine vote shares for different parties together to index a pro-Remain or pro-Leave vote. A Press Association report aggregated support for explicitly anti-Brexit parties, defined as the LibDems, Greens, SNP, Plaid Cymru and Change UK, totalling 40.4%, versus that for those supporting a no-deal Brexit, the Brexit Party and UKIP, on 34.9% (figures are for Great Britain only, excluding Northern Ireland where there was a majority for anti-Brexit parties). That analysis excludes Labour on 14% and the Conservatives on 9%. Guardian journalist Dan Sabbagh noted how there were several possible comparisons one could make, e.g. the Brexit Party (5.2 million votes) against the Liberal Democrats and Greens combined (5.4 million votes); or the Brexit Party, UKIP and the DUP (5.9 million votes) against the Liberal Democrats, Greens, Change UK, SNP, Plaid Cymru, Sinn Féin and Alliance (6.8 million votes). In terms of seats, 34 were won by Leave-supporting parties and 39 by Remain-supporting parties (if Conservatives are counted for 'Leave'). Sabbagh, later followed by fellow Guardian journalist Polly Toynbee, tackled how to account for Labour and Conservative votes by adding them in based on polling as to how their supporters split—assigning 80% of Conservative voters to Leave and 60% of Labour voters to remain—in this way predicting a 50%-Remain-to-47%-Leave split in a second referendum. However, BBC political journalist Laura Kuenssberg critiqued the whole endeavour of adding up different vote shares. In terms of a comparison between Leave- and Remain-supporting parties, psephologist John Curtice simply described the result as a draw.

A large post-vote poll commissioned by Michael Ashcroft estimated that 53% of those who voted Conservative in the 2017 general election voted for the Brexit Party, while 21% voted Conservative and 12% voted Liberal Democrat. 38% of those who voted Labour in 2017 supported the party at this election, while 22% voted Liberal Democrat, 17% Green and 13% Brexit Party. 69% of the LibDem voters of 2017 stayed with the party, while 13% voted Green and 7% Brexit Party. 24% of the UKIP voters of 2017 stayed with their party, but 68% switched to the Brexit Party. Among all voters, 50% said they had voted to remain in the referendum and 45% to leave; and 50% stated they now wanted to leave, and 46% stated they now wanted to remain.

YouGov released polling suggesting 41% of Labour Party members voted for other parties at the European election (including 19% Green and 15% Liberal Democrat). Likewise, 67% of Conservative Party members voted for other parties (59% Brexit Party).

=== Electoral Commission report ===
The Electoral Commission released its report on the election on 8 October 2019. The report highlighted the difficulties for EU27 citizens and British citizens abroad to vote, despite concerns raised after the 2014 European election.

== Reaction to results ==
The results were expected to push the Conservative Party towards a more hardline position with respect to Brexit and to lean towards electing a Brexiteer in its leadership contest shortly afterward.

Reacting to the results, the Shadow Foreign Secretary Emily Thornberry and Deputy Leader Tom Watson called for the Labour Party to change its policy to supporting a second referendum and remaining in the EU. There was renewed debate within the Labour Party over its policy, with a shift towards clearer support for a second referendum, including Jeremy Corbyn stating that although a general election would be Labour's preference, any Brexit deal "had to be put to a public vote", but there was continuing criticism over the party's clarity on and Corbyn's commitment to another referendum. A modified policy was announced in July. Meanwhile, Leave supporters in the party were critical of any support for a second referendum.

Alastair Campbell, having revealed he voted for the Liberal Democrats, was expelled from the Labour Party, but this decision was criticised by some in the party. In response, former Labour Home Secretary Charles Clarke and former Labour MP (until 2017) Fiona Mactaggart announced that they had also voted Liberal Democrat, while former Labour Cabinet member Bob Ainsworth announced he had voted Green. A hashtag on Twitter in support, #expelmetoo, proved popular on social media. Watson and Harriet Harman criticised the expulsion. Labour MP Owen Smith, among others, noted the juxtaposition of Campbell's expulsion on the same day that the EHRC opened an enquiry into anti-Semitism in Labour and the slow response to complaints of anti-Semitism. It then emerged that Cherie Blair, wife of the former Labour Prime Minister Tony Blair, had also voted Liberal Democrat. YouGov polling suggested 41% of Labour Party members voted for other parties (including 19% Green and 15% Liberal Democrat) at the election.

General election polling shortly after the European elections showed continued support for the Brexit Party and the Liberal Democrats. A YouGov poll conducted on 28–29 May put the Liberal Democrats first and the Brexit Party second, with Labour and the Conservatives third. This was the first time a national poll had found that neither of the most popular two parties were Labour or the Conservatives since 2010.

On 4 June 2019, in response to their poor performance in the elections, six of the eleven MPs in Change UK left the group to return to sitting as independents. The party's former spokesperson, Chuka Umunna, announced on 13 June that he would be seeking to join the Liberal Democrats.

== MEPs not returning ==
=== MEPs not standing for re-election ===
Twenty-eight MEPs sitting at the end of the European Parliament's term did not seek re-election.

==== Brexit Party ====
All originally elected as UKIP:

- Tim Aker – East of England
- Jonathan Arnott – North East England
- David Coburn – Scotland
- Jane Collins – Yorkshire and the Humber
- Bill Etheridge – West Midlands
- Ray Finch – South East England
- Diane James – South East England
- Paul Nuttall – North West England
- Margot Parker – East Midlands
- Julia Reid – South West England
- Jill Seymour – West Midlands

==== Conservative ====
- David Campbell Bannerman – East of England
- Jacqueline Foster – North West England
- Kay Swinburne – Wales

==== Greens ====
- Jean Lambert – London
- Keith Taylor – South East England

==== Labour ====
- Lucy Anderson – London
- Mary Honeyball – London
- Derek Vaughan – Wales

Two additional Labour MEPs had already resigned ahead of the election, with their seats remaining vacant for the rest of the Parliament:

- Linda McAvan – Yorkshire and the Humber (resigned 18 April 2019)
- Catherine Stihler – Scotland (resigned 31 January 2019)

==== Independents elected as UKIP ====
- Janice Atkinson – South East England
- Louise Bours – North West England
- James Carver – West Midlands
- William Legge, Earl of Dartmouth – South West England
- Steven Woolfe – North West England

==== Other ====
- Julie Girling, independent MEP for South West England; originally elected as Conservative
- Patrick O'Flynn, SDP MEP for East of England; originally elected as UKIP
- Ian Hudghton, SNP MEP for Scotland
- Jim Nicholson, Ulster Unionist MEP for Northern Ireland

=== Incumbent MEPs defeated ===
21 MEPs were unseated.

Change UK

- Richard Ashworth – South East England (originally elected as Conservative)

Conservative

- Amjad Bashir – Yorkshire and the Humber (originally elected as UK Independence Party)
- Daniel Dalton – West Midlands
- Nirj Deva – South East England
- John Flack – East of England
- Ashley Fox (Conservative Group leader in the European Parliament) – South West England
- Syed Kamall (co-chair of the ECR group) – London
- Sajjad Karim – North West England
- Rupert Matthews – East Midlands
- Emma McClarkin – East Midlands
- John Procter – Yorkshire and the Humber
- Charles Tannock – London

Labour

- Paul Brannen – North East England
- Wajid Khan – North West England
- David Martin – Scotland
- Alex Mayer – East of England
- Clare Moody – South West England
- Siôn Simon – West Midlands

UK Independence Party

- Stuart Agnew – East of England
- Gerard Batten (UKIP leader) – London
- Mike Hookem – Yorkshire and the Humber

== See also ==
- Opinion polling on the United Kingdom's membership of the European Union (2016–2020)
- 2019 European Parliament election in Gibraltar
- 2019 United Kingdom general election
