= Graham Watson =

British politician (born 1956)

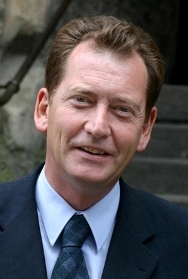
- Graham Watson in 2010

President of the Alliance of Liberals and Democrats for Europe Party
- In office 25 November 2011 – 21 November 2015
- Preceded by: Annemie Neyts-Uyttebroeck
- Succeeded by: Hans van Baalen

Leader of the Alliance of Liberals and Democrats for Europe Group
- In office 25 May 2004 – 1 July 2009
- Preceded by: Office established
- Succeeded by: Guy Verhofstadt

Member of the European Parliament for South West England
- In office 19 July 1994 – 30 June 2014
- Preceded by: Constituency established

Personal details
- Born: 23 March 1956 (age 70) Rothesay, Scotland
- Citizenship: United Kingdom • Italy
- Party: Liberal Democrats (1988–present); LDE (2024–present)
- Other political affiliations: Liberal (1972–1988); NLYL (1972–1988)
- Spouse: Rita Giannini
- Children: 2
- Education: Heriot-Watt University

Sir Graham Robert Watson (born 23 March 1956) is a British Liberal Democrat politician who served as a Member of the European Parliament (MEP) for South West England from 1994 to 2014. Watson was the chairman of the Parliament's committee on citizens rights, justice and home affairs (1999–2002). He then served for seven and a half years as leader of the Liberal Group in the European Parliament, first as leader of the European Liberal Democrat and Reform Party Group (2002–2004) and then as leader of the new Alliance of Liberals and Democrats for Europe Group (2004–2009). From 2011 until 2015, he was the president of the Alliance of Liberals and Democrats for Europe Party. From 2015 to 2020, he was a UK member on the European Economic and Social Committee. He is currently an adjunct Professor at the University of Toronto's Munk School of Global Affairs and Public Policy.

Sir Graham, who holds Italian citizenship through marriage, was chosen as head of list for the 2024 European Parliament election in North East Italy by the centrist coalition United States of Europe. He was not elected since the coalition failed to reach the threshold of votes required nationwide to elect MEPs.

== Early life ==
Graham Watson was born in Rothesay on the Isle of Bute (Scotland), the eldest of six children. His father was an officer in the Royal Navy and his mother, a teacher. Watson was educated at the City of Bath Boys' School following his father’s posting to the Admiralty in Bath. He returned to Scotland to attend Heriot-Watt University in Edinburgh, where he graduated in 1979 with a Bachelor of Arts in modern languages. While at university he spent one semester studying at the University of Geneva and one at Karl Marx University in Leipzig in the German Democratic Republic. At the latter he was spied on by a fellow British student working for the East German Stasi (State Security Police): the story of this is told in the book The Stasi Files by (Free Press, 2004) and has been the subject of documentary film productions by the BBC and Channel Four. On graduating from university in 1979, Watson worked first as a freelance interpreter and translator and then (1980–83) as an administrator at Paisley College of Technology. He now speaks four European languages.

Watson began his political activity in the Scottish Young Liberals in 1976. As international officer of the Scottish Young Liberals he became involved in the International Federation of Liberal Youth, becoming a vice-president (1977) then General Secretary (1979) of the organization. He was a founder of the European Communities' Youth Forum. He served as a council member of the European Liberal Democrat and Reform Party between 1983 and 1993. Between 1983 and 1987 he also served as head of the private office of then leader of the British Liberal Party, Sir David Steel.

In 1988 he began work for the bank HSBC in London and Hong Kong. His time there encompassed three months with the European Bank for Reconstruction and Development and gave him an interest in the Far East. He has travelled widely in the region and speaks some Mandarin Chinese.

== European Parliament ==
In the 1994 European Parliamentary election he was elected for Somerset and North Devon with a majority of over 22,500. Watson was the first Liberal Democrat returned from a British constituency to serve in the European Parliament. Accompanied by Robin Teverson, elected later the same night, he sat with the Group of the European Liberal Democrat and Reform Party (ELDR). During this term, Watson served on two committees; the Committee on Economic and Monetary Affairs and Industrial Policy and the Committee on Budgets, and acted as whip for the ELDR group until 1996.

=== Second term ===
In 1999 the introduction of the list system (a form of proportional representation) in Great Britain for European elections meant Watson's constituency was abolished in favour of a larger multi-member constituency encompassing South West England. The South West constituency would later also include Gibraltar, from 2004. Watson was re-elected in this constituency as the sole Liberal Democrat member at the 1999 European Parliamentary election. His party had gained 171,398 votes, 15.7% of the total. During this term he led the ten British Liberal Democrats in the parliament and between 1999 and 2002 he held the chair of the Committee on Citizens' Freedoms and Rights, Justice and Home Affairs. In that position he steered through Parliament freedom of information provisions and the legislation providing for a European Arrest Warrant. In 2002 he was elected to lead the EU-wide ELDR Group, succeeding Irishman Pat Cox MEP.

=== Third term ===
Watson was re-elected once more at the 2004 European Parliamentary election with his party winning 265,619 votes (18.3%).

Following the election, Watson was re-elected to lead the ELDR Group and took it into an alliance with Romano Prodi’s newly-formed European Democratic Party to form the Alliance of Liberals and Democrats for Europe. The ALDE group replaced the ELDR group (though ELDR and EDP existed for a while as separate parties outside the Parliament). Watson was elected leader of the new ALDE group, which was the largest group ever established in the Parliament outside of the European People's Party and Party of European Socialists.

=== Fourth term ===
Watson was elected to a fourth term as an MEP for the South West in the European Parliament elections of June 2009, with the Liberal Democrats winning 266,253 votes (17.07%). Following the election, Watson stood down from the leadership of the ALDE Group, having served in that role for longer than any of his predecessors. He sat on the European Parliament's foreign affairs committee and served as Chairman of Parliament's Delegation for relations with India. He also chaired a global network of legislators campaigning for a switch from fossil fuels to renewable energy known as The Climate Parliament, of which he had been a founder member in the late 1990s.

== 2014 European elections ==
Watson lost his seat at the European Parliament in the elections of May 2014, despite having polled 10.7% of the vote, the largest vote share of the UK Liberal Democrat party in the 2014 EP election. He established a global advocacy practice, Bagehot Limited, which he ran until reaching retirement age in 2021.

In 2015 Watson was appointed by the UK Government to sit on the European Economic and Social Committee, an advisory body with a five-year mandate. He sat on the Transport and Energy section and on the Foreign Affairs section and from 2015 to 2017 was chairman of the EESC's China Contact Group.

== Other activities and family ==
Watson lived in Langport, Somerset, from 1994 to 2017. He now lives in Edinburgh and in Brussels. His wife is from Italy and their children, one daughter and one son, were born in 1992 and 1995 respectively.

Watson was knighted in the 2011 Birthday Honours for political and public service. He is also the recipient of honours from the Republic of China (Taiwan), Georgia, and Gibraltar.

From 2018 to 2023 Watson served as Chairman of the Advisory Board of the European Centre for Populism Studies. In 2021 he was elected to the Board of the European Cyclists' Federation and in November 2022 was elected Chairman of the World Cycling Alliance; he served in both roles until 2026.

Watson is a supporter of the Campaign for the Establishment of a United Nations Parliamentary Assembly, now known as 'Democracy Without Borders', an organisation which advocates democratic reform of the United Nations.

== Bibliography ==
- Watson, Graham, Andrew Burgess (2014). Continental Drift. Bagehot Publishing. ISBN 978-0-9931125-0-8
- Watson, Graham, Andrew Burgess (2012). Letters from Europe. Bagehot Publishing.| ISBN 978-0-9545745-8-1
- Watson, Graham (2010). Building a Liberal Europe: The ALDE Project. John Harper Publishing. ISBN 978-0-9564508-1-4.
- Watson, Graham; Christine Gilmore (2006). The Power of Speech. Bagehot Publishing. ISBN 978-0-9545745-4-3.
- Watson, Graham; Simon Titley (2006). Liberalism – Something to Shout About. Bagehot Publishing. ISBN 978-0-9545745-3-6.
- Watson, Graham; Katharine Durrant (2005). Liberal Democracy & Globalisation. Bagehot Publishing. ISBN 978-0-9545745-2-9.
- Watson, Graham; Sarah Kent (2004). EU've Got Mail!: Liberal Letters from the European Parliament. Bagehot Publishing. ISBN 978-0-9545745-1-2.
- Watson, Graham; Sarah Kent (1989–2003). Liberal Language: Speeches and Essays. Bagehot Publishing. ISBN 978-0-9545745-0-5.
- Watson, Graham; Howard Mollet (2001). 2020 Vision.
- Watson, Graham; Joanna Hazelwood (2000). To the Power of Ten: UK Liberal Democrats in the European Parliament. Centre for Reform. ISBN 978-1-902622-17-0.
- Watson, Graham (1980). The Liberals in the North-South dialogue.

Party political offices
Preceded by Pat Cox	Leader of the European Liberal Democrat and Reform Party in the European Parliament; 2002–2004	Position abolished
New office	Leader of the Alliance of Liberals and Democrats for Europe in the European Parliament; 2004–2009	Succeeded by Guy Verhofstadt
Preceded by Annemie Neyts-Uyttebroeck	President of the Alliance of Liberals and Democrats for Europe Party; 2011–2015	Succeeded by Hans van Baalen
