= Gibraltar Conservatives =

Political party of Gibraltar

- Headquarters: P.O.Box 419 Suite 16 Watergardens 5
- Ideology: Conservatism; Economic liberalism; British unionism
- Political position: Centre-right to right-wing
- National affiliation: Conservative Party
- International affiliation: International Democrat Union
- Colours: Blue
- Local affiliation: Gibraltar Social Democrats

Website
- gib-conservatives.com

The Conservative Party in Gibraltar is the part of the Conservative Party that operates in the British Overseas Territory of Gibraltar. It is a branch of the South West England Region of the Conservative Party. The party does not field candidates in local elections in the territory, and only ever stood candidates for the former European Parliament constituency of South West England and Gibraltar.

== History ==
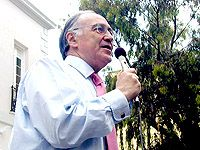
Michael Howard, then Conservative leader, addressing voters outside the Gibraltar House of Assembly (now the Gibraltar Parliament) for the 2004 European Election.

Gibraltar was first represented in European Elections in 2004 as part of the South West England constituency. None of the main Gibraltar political parties ever contested European elections, so voters chose from United Kingdom party lists. The Gibraltar Social Democrats have however endorsed the Conservatives in European and UK Parliamentary elections.

=== 2004 ===
The Conservative Party polled over two-thirds of the Gibraltar vote, with no other party exceeding 10% support. This was to a large part due to the perception that the Labour government in Britain had "betrayed" Gibraltar by attempting to negotiate a constitutional settlement involving joint sovereignty with Spain. This arrangement was rejected overwhelmingly by Gibraltarians in the 2002 sovereignty referendum. The Conservatives were perceived as being unequivocal in their support for Gibraltar's continued British status. In addition both the leader of the Conservative Party, Michael Howard, and his deputy, Michael Ancram, flew in to rally support. Before the election the local Conservatives mounted a vigorous campaign.

=== 2009 ===
The Conservatives won with 51% of the votes.

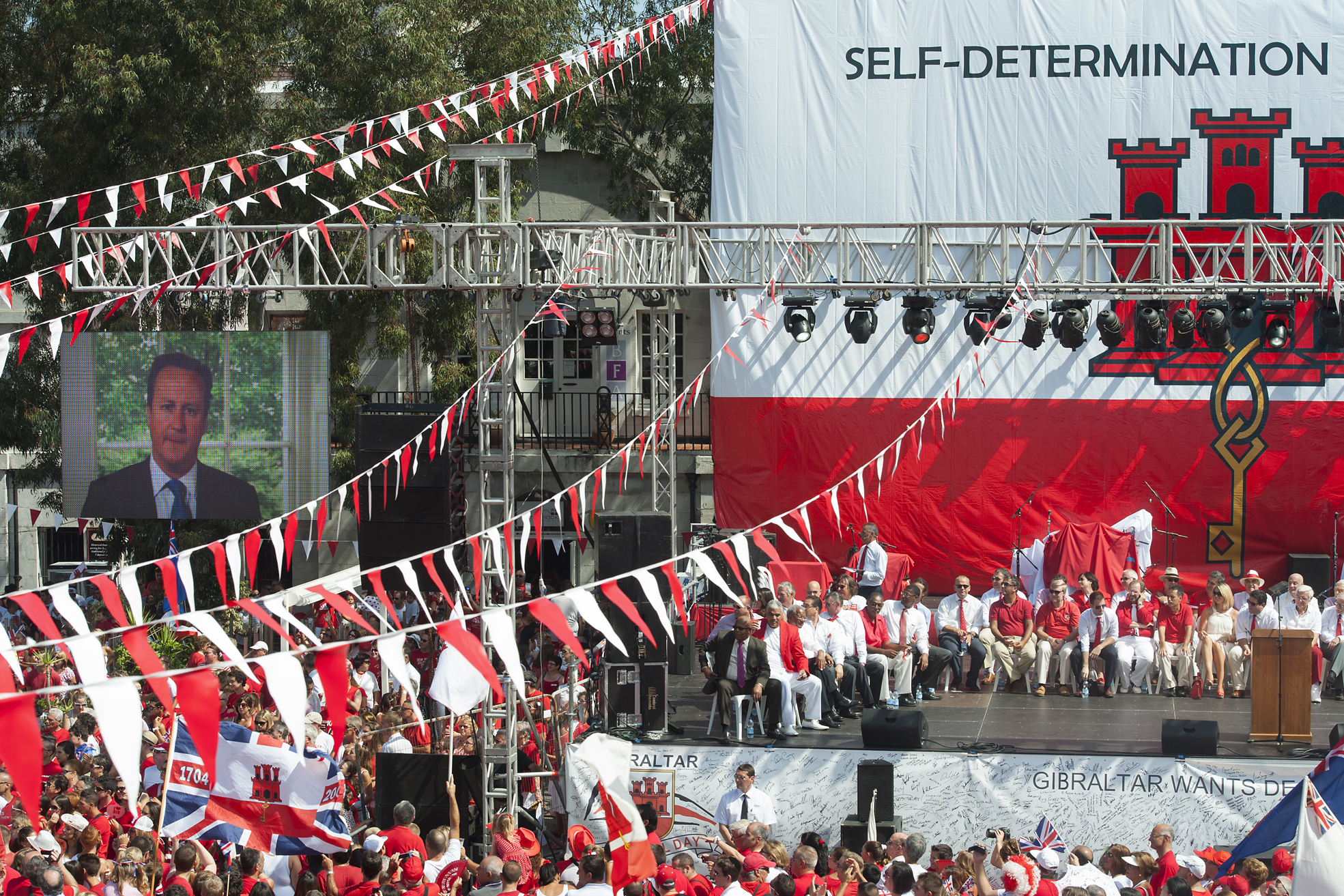
David Cameron speaking at the Gibraltar National Day by video link in 2013.

=== 2014 ===
On the previous two occasions Gibraltar has participated in European elections, the Conservative Party had topped the poll. The Liberal Democrats won the popular vote in the territory for the first time.

=== 2019 ===
Consistent with the poor performance of the Conservatives throughout the UK in the 2019 European Parliament election, and widespread opposition to Brexit in the territory, the party received just 2.7% of the votes in Gibraltar, moving into fifth place with the Liberal Democrats and the Brexit Party taking the first and second places in the election. Incumbent MEP Ashley Fox lost his seat.

== Electoral performance ==
The below table lists performance in European Parliamentary elections.

| Year | Votes (Gib.) | Votes (SW Eng) | % (Gib.) | % (SW Eng) | Change (SW Eng) | Seats | Position |
|---|---|---|---|---|---|---|---|
| 2004 | 8,297 | 457,371 | 69.52 | 31.6 | −10.1 | 3 | 1 |
| 2009 | 3,721 | 468,742 | 53.30 | 30.2 | −1.3 | 3 | 1 |
| 2014 | 1,236 | 433,151 | 17.2 | 28.9 | −1.4 | 2 | 2 |
| 2019 | 256 | 144,674 | 2.7 | 8.71 | −20.19 | 0 | 5 |

== MEPs ==
| Former Conservative MEPs for Gibraltar | Caroline Jackson; Conservative; 2004–2009 (Note: Was an MEP since 1984, prior to Gibraltar's inclusion in the elections) | Neil Parish; Conservative; 2004–2009 (Note: Was an MEP since 1999, prior to Gibraltar's inclusion in the elections) | Giles Chichester; Conservative; 2004–2014 (Note: Was an MEP since 1994, prior to Gibraltar's inclusion in the elections) | Julie Girling; Conservative; 2009–2017 (Note: Was an MEP until 2019, suspended for voting against the party whip) | Ashley Fox; Conservative; 2009–2019 |
