= 2004 European Parliament election =

- 10–13 June 2004

All 732 seats to the European Parliament 367 seats needed for a majority
- Turnout: 45.47% ▼4.04 pp
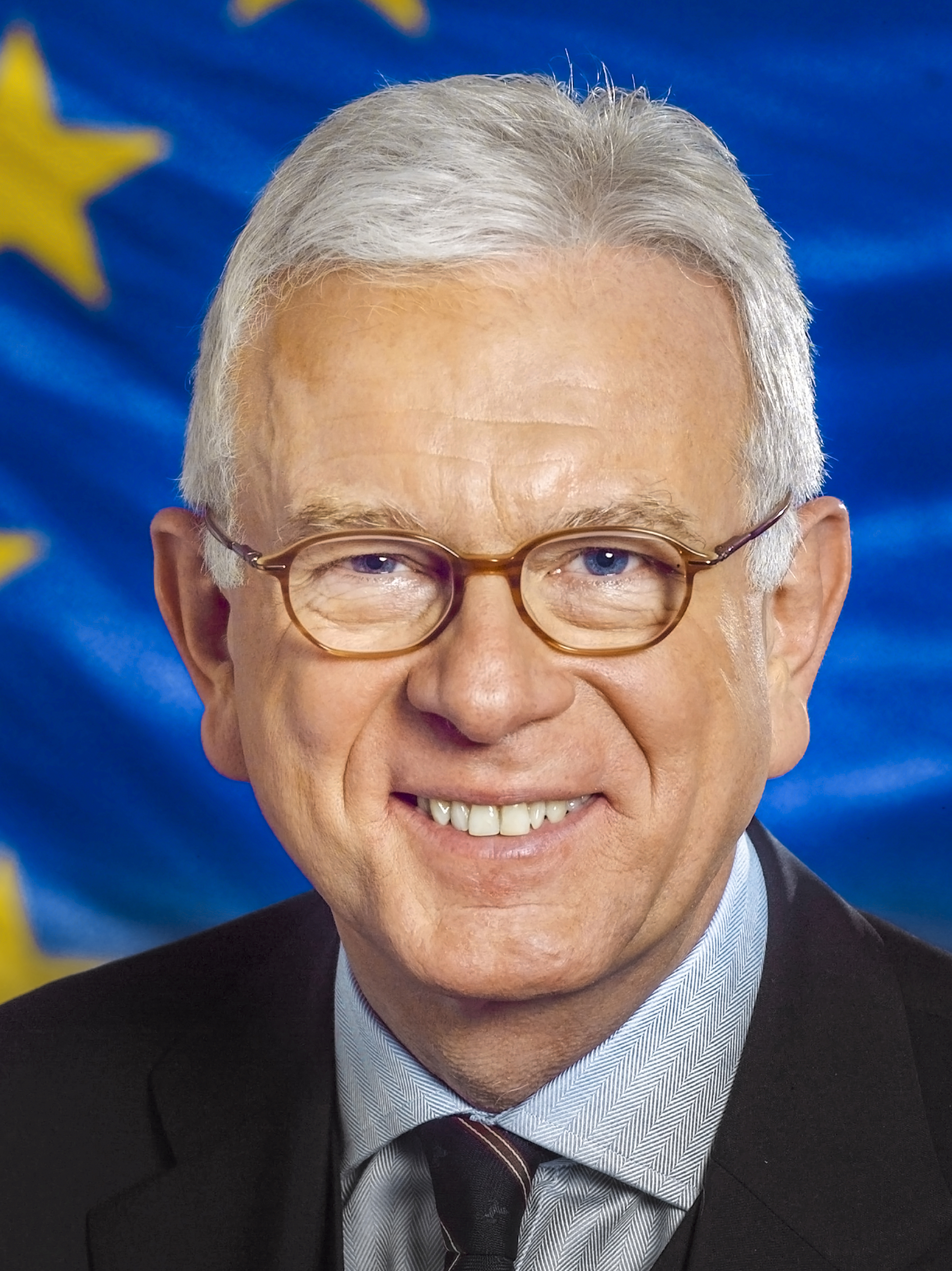

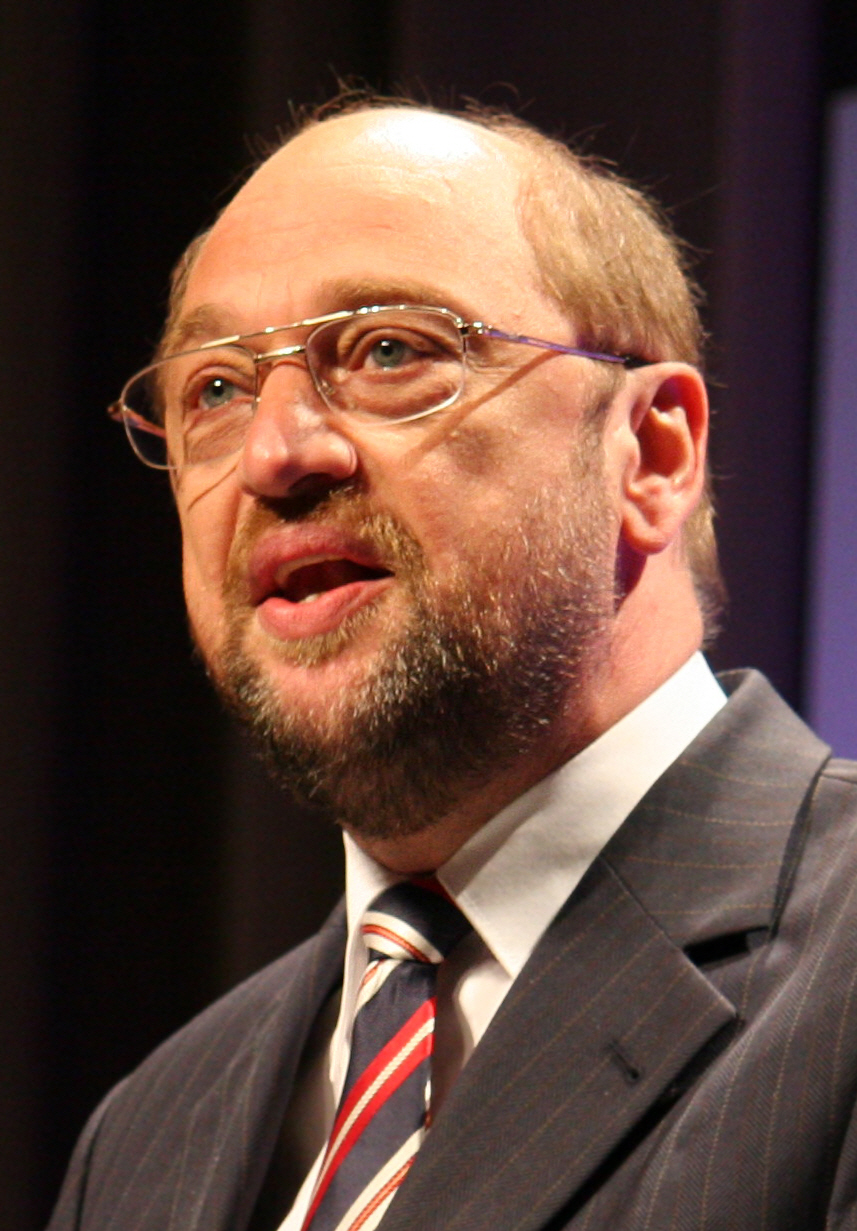

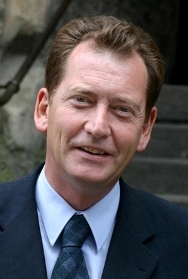

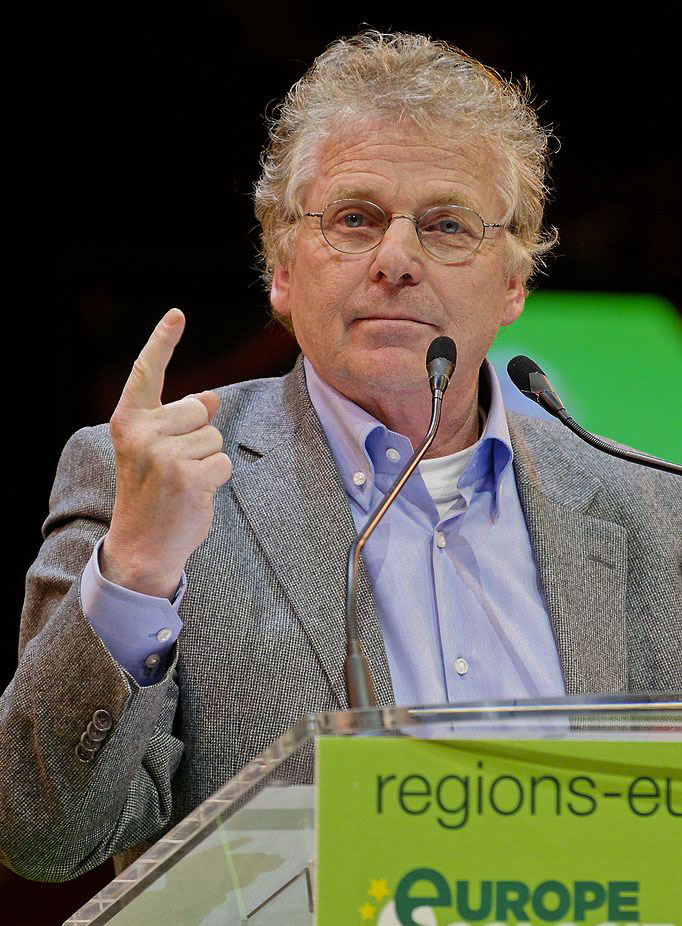

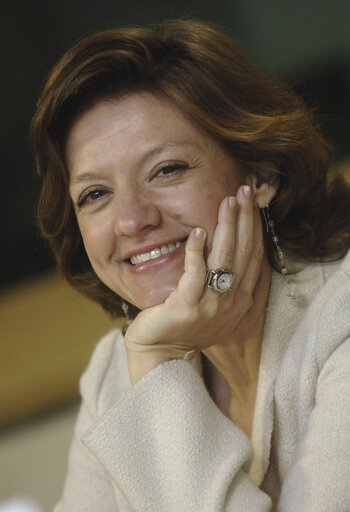

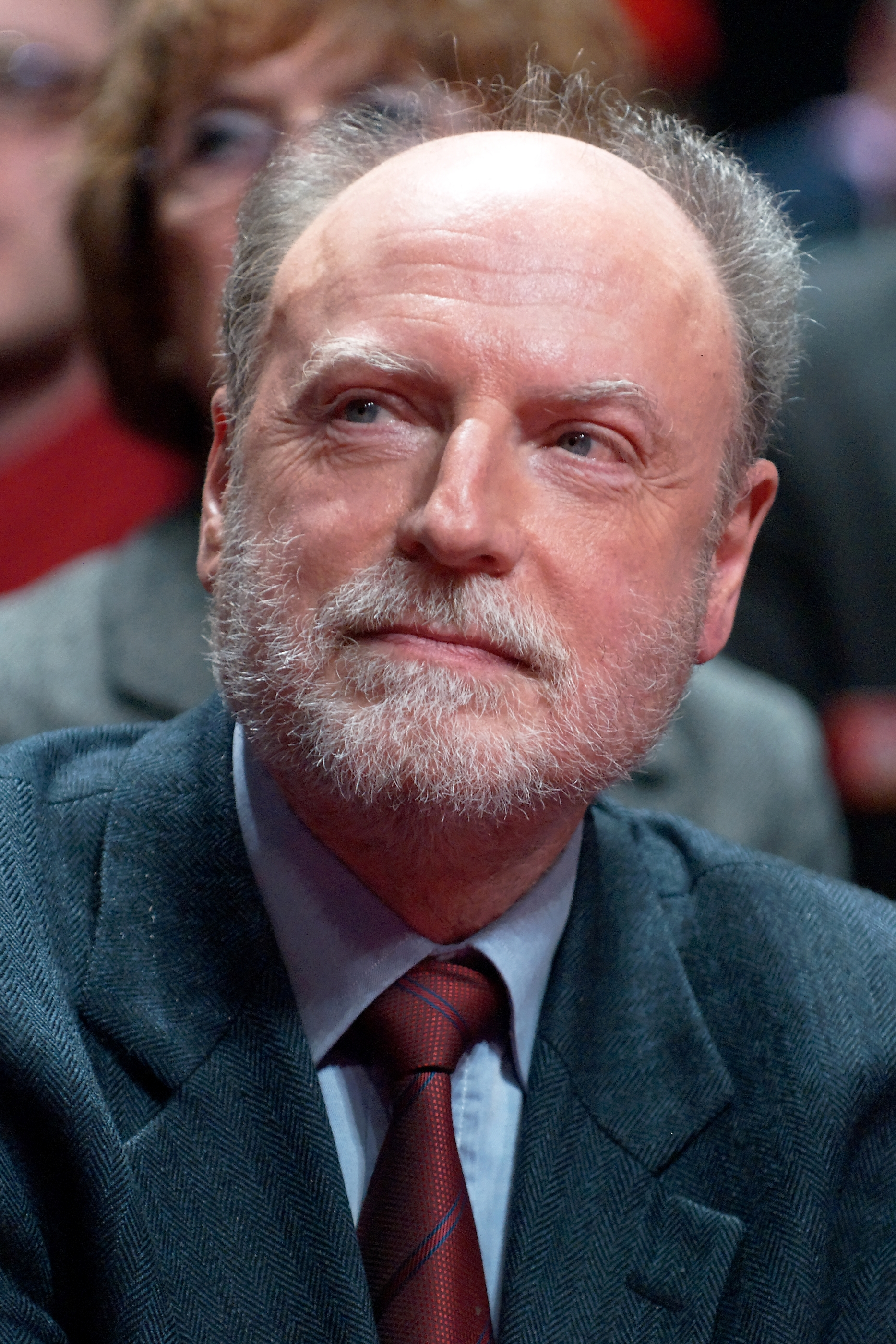

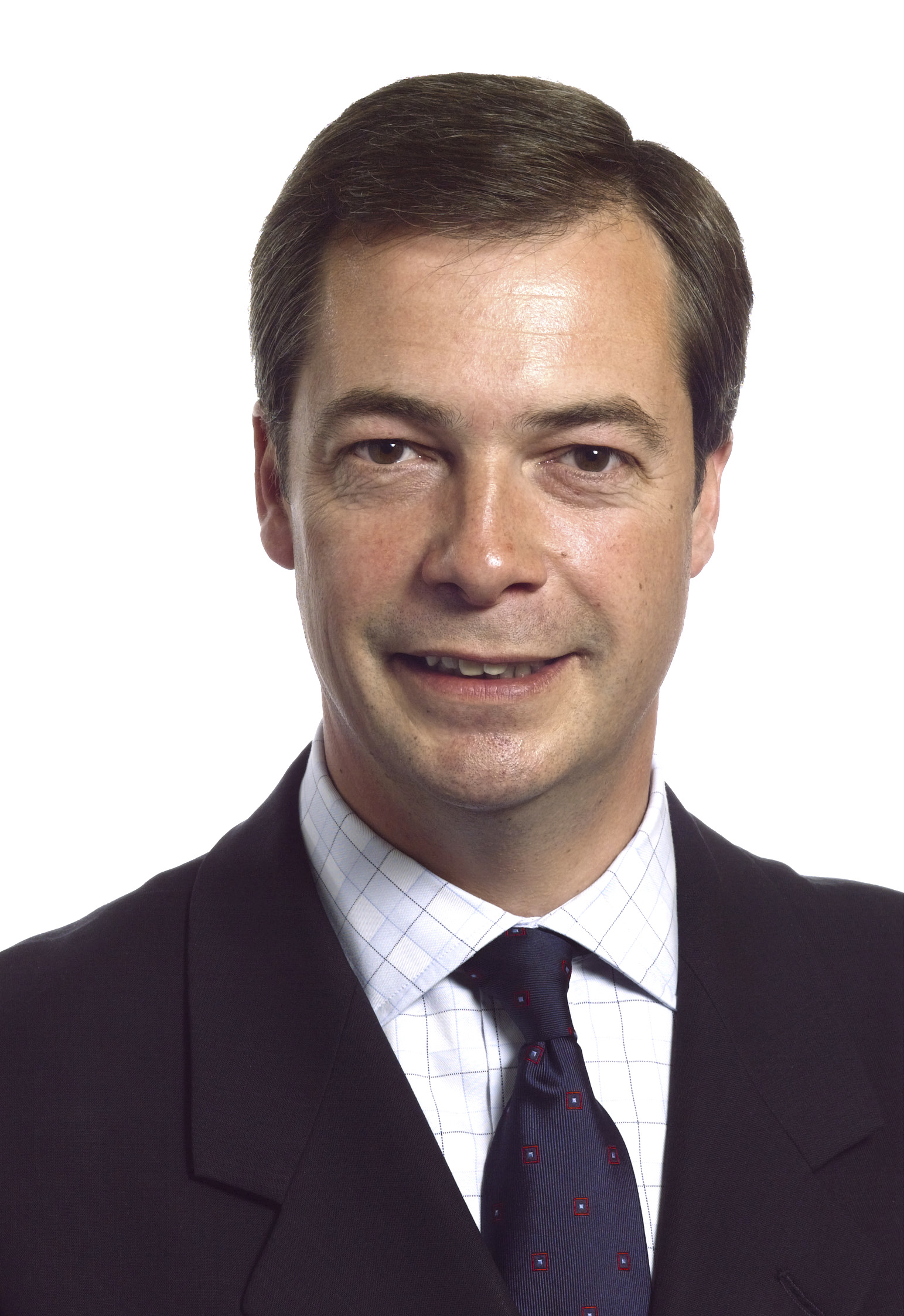

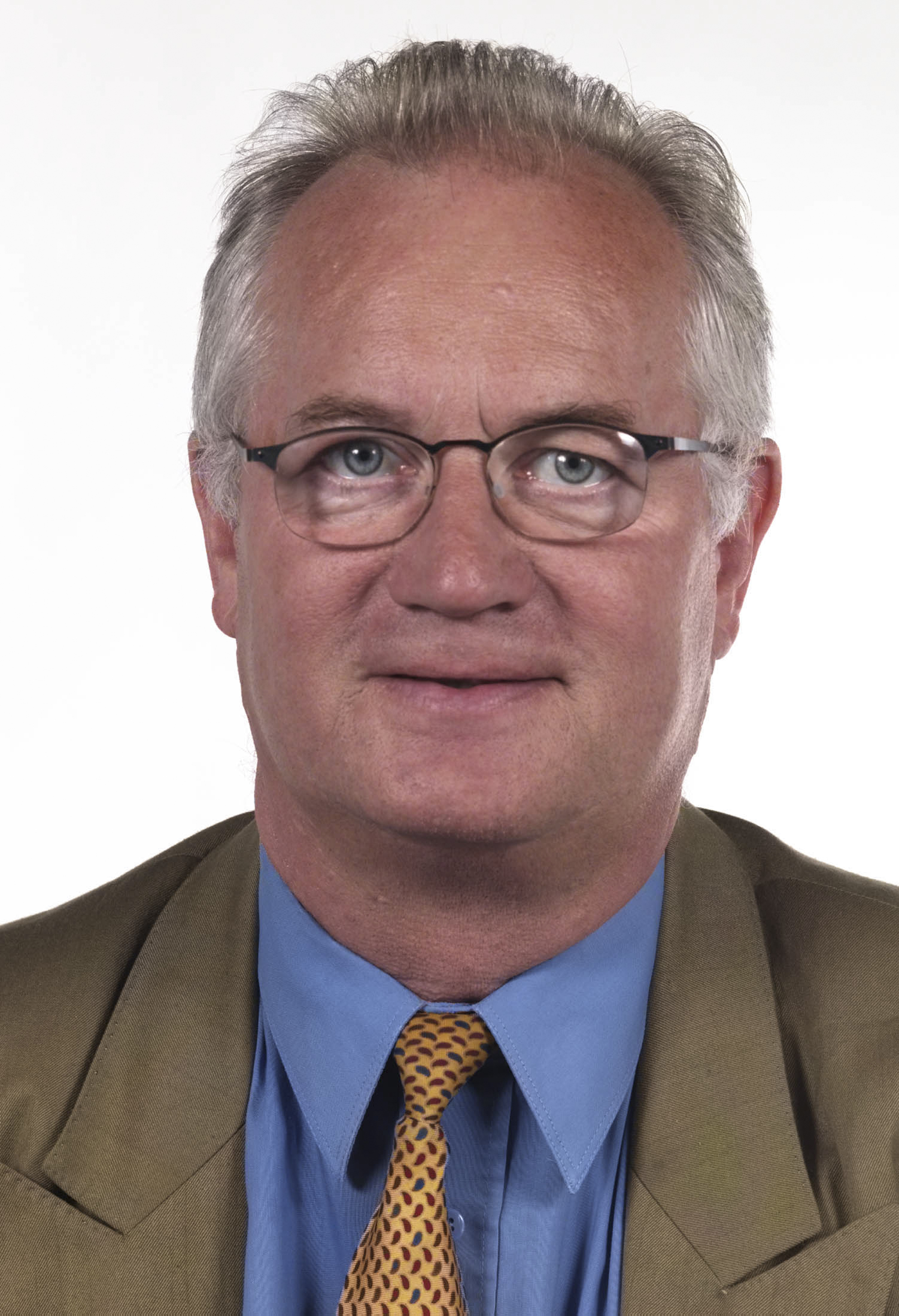
Leader	Hans-Gert Pöttering	Martin Schulz	Graham Watson
Alliance	EPP–ED	PES	ALDE
Leader's seat	Germany	Germany	South West England
Last election	232 seats, 37.1%	180 seats, 28.8%	50 seats, 8.0%
Seats before	295	232	67
Seats won	268	200	88
Seat change	▲36	▲20	▲38
Leader	Daniel Cohn-Bendit; Monica Frassoni	Francis Wurtz	Nigel Farage; Jens-Peter Bonde
Alliance	Greens/EFA	GUE/NGL	IND/DEM
Leader's seat	Germany; North-West Italy	Île-de-France	South East England; Denmark
Last election	48 seats, 7.7%	42 seats, 6.7%	16 seats, 2.6%
Seats before	47	55	18
Seats won	42	41	37
Seat change	▼6	▼1	▲21
- Post-election composition of each member state's delegation
President of the European Parliament before election
Pat Cox
ELDR
President of the
European Parliament after election
Josep Borrell
PES

The 2004 European Parliament election was held between 10 and 13 June 2004 in the 25 member states of the European Union, using varying election days according to local custom. The electorate did not vote directly for European political parties, but they voted for candidates of national parties to the European Parliament.

Votes were counted as the polls closed, but results were not announced until 13 and 14 June so results from one country would not influence voters in another where polls were still open; however, the Netherlands, voting on Thursday 10, announced nearly complete provisional results as soon as they were counted, on the evening of its election day, a move heavily criticized by the European Commission.

342 million people were eligible to vote, the second-largest democratic electorate in the world after India. It was the biggest transnational direct election in history, and the 10 new member states elected MEPs for the first time. The new (6th) Parliament consisted of 732 Members of the European Parliament (MEPs).

Results showed a general defeat of governing parties and an increase in representatives from eurosceptic parties. No majority was achieved. The balance of power in the Parliament remained the same (largest party EPP-ED, second largest PES) despite the 10 new member states.

Following the 2004 enlargement of the European Union which was finalized on 1 May 2004, this was the first European Parliament election to be held in Cyprus, the Czech Republic, Estonia, Hungary, Latvia, Lithuania, Malta, Poland, Slovakia, and Slovenia.

== Results ==
European Parliament election, 2004 - Final results on 20 July 2004
Group	Description	Chaired by	MEPs		
EPP-ED	Conservatives and Christian democrats	Hans-Gert Pöttering	268		
PES	Social democrats	Martin Schulz	200		
ALDE	Liberals and liberal democrats	Graham Watson	88		
G–EFA	Greens and regionalists	Daniel Cohn-Bendit; Monica Frassoni	42		
EUL–NGL	Democratic socialists and communists	Francis Wurtz	41		
ID	Eurosceptics	Jens-Peter Bonde; Nigel Farage	37		
UEN	National conservatives	Brian Crowley; Cristiana Muscardini	27		
NI	Independents and far right	none	29	Total: 732	Sources:

Seats summary
EPP–ED	36.61%
PES	27.32%
ALDE	12.02%
G–EFA	5.74%
GUE/NGL	5.60%
ID	5.05%
UEN	3.69%
NI	3.96%

== Statistics ==
European Parliament election, 2004 - Statistics
Area	European Union (EU-25)	Sources
Dates	Thursday 10 June: Netherlands, United Kingdom, Friday 11 June: Czech Republic, Ireland; Saturday 12 June: Czech Republic, Italy, Latvia, Malta; Sunday 13 June: Austria, Belgium, Cyprus, Denmark, Estonia, Finland, France, Germany, Greece, Hungary, Italy, Lithuania, Luxembourg, Poland, Portugal, Slovakia, Slovenia, Spain, Sweden	
Seats	732	
Candidates	over 14,600	
Electorate	342 million	
Turnout	45.6%	
Previous	1999 European Parliament election	n/a
Next	2009 European Parliament election	n/a
Election methods	All proportional representation.	
Preference voting allowed?	Yes, via open list: Austria, Belgium, Lithuania, Luxembourg (with panachage), Netherlands, Slovenia, Slovakia, Sweden.; Yes, via STV: Ireland, Malta, United Kingdom (NI only); No: the rest	
Cutoff?	5%: Czech Republic, France, Germany, Hungary, Lithuania, Poland, Slovakia; 4%: Austria, Sweden; 3%: Greece; none: the rest	
Seat allocation	Sainte-Laguë method: Latvia, Sweden; STV method: Ireland, Malta, United Kingdom (NI only); Highest averages method: France; Largest remainder method: Italy; Pro-rata: Greece; Droop method: Slovakia; Hare-Niemeyer method: Germany; Hare-Niemeyer method and D'Hondt method: Poland; D'Hondt method: the rest	
Constituency boundaries	Member state subdivided into multiple constituencies: Belgium (3), France (8), Ireland (4), Italy (5), Poland (13), United Kingdom (12); Mixture: Germany (candidate lists at Länder or national level); Member state as single constituency: the rest	
Minimum voting age	18	
Presidential election	First round: Josep Borrell, 388 votes; Bronisław Geremek, 208 votes; Francis Wurtz, 51 votes; Josep Borrell, having achieved a majority of valid votes in the first round, was elected President of the European Parliament	

European Parliament election, 2004 - Timeline
Fifth Parliament			2004 Election		Regrouping		Sixth Parliament	
Groups	Pre-enlargement April 30	Pre-elections May 5	Change	Results June 30	Change	Results July 20	New Groups	First session July 20
EPP-ED	232	295	-16	279	-11	268	EPP-ED	268
PES	175	232	-33	199	+1	200	PES	200
ELDR	52	67	0	67	+21	88	ALDE	88
G/EFA	45	47	-7	40	+2	42	G/EFA	42
EUL-NGL	49	55	-16	39	+2	41	EUL-NGL	41
EDD	18	18	-3	15	+22	37	ID	37
NI	32	44	22	66	-37	29	NI	29
UEN	23	30	-3	27	0	27	UEN	27
Total	626	788	-56	732	0	732	Total	732

European Parliament election, 2004 - Delegation at 20 July 2004
Group	Description	Details	%	MEPs
EPP-ED	Conservatives and Christian democrats	Germany 49, Belgium 6, Denmark 1, France 17, Ireland 5, Italy 24, Luxembourg 3, Netherlands 7, UK 28, Greece 11, Spain 24, Portugal 9, Austria 6, Finland 4, Sweden 5, Cyprus 3, Estonia 1, Hungary 13, Latvia 3, Lithuania 2, Malta 2, Poland 19, Czech Republic 14, Slovakia 8, Slovenia 4	37%	268
PES	Social democrats	Germany 23, Belgium 7, Denmark 5, France 31, Ireland 1, Italy 16, Luxembourg 1, Netherlands 7, UK 19, Greece 8, Spain 24, Portugal 12, Austria 7, Finland 3, Sweden 5, Estonia 3, Hungary 9, Lithuania 2, Malta 3, Poland 8, Czech Republic 2, Slovakia 3, Slovenia 1	27%	200
ALDE	Liberals and liberal democrats	Germany 7, Belgium 6, Denmark 4, France 11, Ireland 1, Italy 12, Luxembourg 1, Netherlands 5, UK 12, Spain 2, Finland 5, Sweden 3, Cyprus 1, Estonia 2, Hungary 2, Latvia 1, Lithuania 7, Poland 4, Slovenia 2	12%	88
G/EFA	Greens and regionalists	Germany 13, Belgium 2, Denmark 1, France 6, Italy 2, Luxembourg 1, Netherlands 4, UK 5, Spain 3, Austria 2, Finland 1, Sweden 1, Latvia 1	6%	42
EUL/NGL	Left-wing group	Germany 7, Denmark 1, France 3, Ireland 1, Italy 7, Netherlands 2, UK 1, Greece 4, Spain 1, Portugal 3, Finland 1, Sweden 2, Cyprus 2, Czech Republic 6	6%	41
IND/DEM	Eurosceptics	Denmark 1, France 3, Ireland 1, Italy 4, Netherlands 2, UK 11, Greece 1, Sweden 3, Poland 10, Czech Republic 1	5%	37
NI	Independents	Belgium 3, France 7, Italy 4, UK 2, Austria 3, Poland 6, Czech Republic 1, Slovakia 3	4%	29
UEN	National conservatives	Denmark 1, Ireland 4, Italy 9, Latvia 4, Lithuania 2, Poland 7	4%	27
Sources:			100%	732

== Results by country ==
The national results as at 21 July 2004 are as follows:

Party group Country	EPP-ED	PES	ELDR	Greens-EFA	EUL-NGL	ID	UEN	others	MEPs	%	Turnout
Austria	6 (ÖVP)	7 (SPÖ)		2 (GRÜNE)				2 (Martin); 1 (FPÖ)	18	2.5%	42.43%
Belgium	4 (CD&V/N-VA); 1 (CDH); 1 (CSP)	4 (PS); 3 (SP.A)	3 (VLD); 3 (MR)	1 (Groen!); 1 (Ecolo)				3 (VB)	24	3.3%	90.81%
Cyprus	2 (DISY); 1 (GTE)		1 (DIKO)		2 (AKEL)				6	0.8%	71.19%
Czech Republic	9 (ODS); 2 (SNK) (Note: Within the SNK-ED coalition); 2 (KDU–ČSL); 1 (ED)	2 (ČSSD)			6 (KSČM)	1 (Ind.)		1 (Ind.)	24	3.3%	28.32%
Denmark	1 (C)	5 (S)	3 (V); 1 (B)	1 (SF)	1 (N)	1 (J)	1 (DF)		14	1.9%	47.9%
Estonia	1 (IL)	3 (SDE)	1 (K); 1 (ER)						6	0.8%	26.83%
Finland	4 (Kok.)	3 (SDP)	4 (Kesk.); 1 (SFP)	1 (Vihr.)	1 (VAS)				14	1.9%	41.1%
France	17 (UMP)	31 (PS)	11 (UDF)	6 (Verts)	3 (PCF)	3 (MPF)		7 (FN)	78	10.7%	42.76%
Germany	40 (CDU); 9 (CSU)	23 (SPD)	7 (FDP)	13 (GRÜNE)	7 (PDS)				99	13.5%	43.0%
Greece	11 (ND)	8 (PASOK)			3 (KKE); 1 (Synaspismós)	1 (LAOS)			24	3.3%	63.4%
Hungary	12 (FIDESZ); 1 (MDF)	9 (MSZP)	2 (SZDSZ)						24	3.3%	38.5%
Ireland	5 (FG)	1 (LAB)	1 (Ind.)		1 (SF)	1 (Ind.)	4 (FF)		13	1.8%	59.7%
Italy	16 (FI); 5 (UDC); 1 (SVP); 1 (UDEUR); 1 (PP)	12 (DS) (Note: Within the Olive Tree coalition); 2 (SDI); 2 (Ind.)	7 (DL); 2 (LB); 2 (IdV); 1 (MRE)	2 (FdV)	5 (PRC); 2 (PdCI)	4 (LN)	9 (AN)	2 (SUE); 1 (AS); 1 (FT)	78	10.7%	73.1%
Latvia	2 (JL); 1 (TP)		1 (LC)	1 (PCTVL)			4 (TB/LNNK)		9	1.2%	41.34%
Lithuania	2 (TS)	2 (LSDP)	5 (DP); 2 (LiCS)				1 (VNDPS); 1 (LDP)		13	1.8%	48.38%
Luxembourg	3 (CSV)	1 (LSAP)	1 (DP)	1 (Gréng)					6	0.8%	90.0%
Malta	2 (PN)	3 (PL)							5	0.7%	82.37%
Netherlands	7 (CDA)	7 (PvdA)	4 (VVD); 1 (D66)	2 (GL); 2 (ET)	2 (SP)	2 (CU-SGP)			27	3.7%	39.3%
Poland	15 (PO); 4 (PSL)	5 (SLD); 3 (SDPL)	4 (UW)			10 (LPR)	7 (PiS)	6 (SRP)	54	7.4%	20.87%
Portugal	7 (PSD); 2 (CDS-PP)	12 (PS)			2 (PCP) (Note: Within the CDU coalition); 1 (BE)				24	3.3%	38.6%
Slovakia	3 (SDKÚ); 3 (KDH); 2 (MKP)	3 (SMER)						3 (ĽS-HZDS)	14	1.9%	16.96%
Slovenia	2 (NSi); 2 (SDS)	1 (ZLSD)	2 (LDS)						7	1.0%	28.3%
Spain	24 (PP)	24 (PSOE)	1 (CDC) (Note: Within the Galeusca coalition); 1 (EAJ)	1 (Verdes) (Note: Included in the PSOE list following an agreement between both parties); 1 (ICV) (Note: Within the IU-ICV-EUiA coalition); 1 (ERC) (Note: Within the EdP coalition)	1 (IU)				54	7.4%	45.1%
Sweden	4 (M); 1 (KD)	5 (SAP)	2 (FP); 1 (C)	1 (MP)	2 (V)	3 (JL)			19	2.6%	37.8%
United Kingdom (Note: Including Gibraltar (details))	27 (CON); 1 (UUP)	19 (LAB)	12 (LD)	2 (GPEW); 2 (SNP); 1 (PC)	1 (SF)	11 (UKIP)		1 (UKIP); 1 (DUP)	78	10.7%	38.9%
Total	268	200	88	42	41	37	27	29	732	100.0%	45.6%

== Results by EU party (2004 estimated result) ==
The estimated votes by EU party are as follows:

European Parliament Election 2004 estimated votes byEU party
Group	Votes	% Votes	Seats	+/-	Party/Subgroup	Votes	% Votes	Seats	+/-
EPP-ED	52,534,612	34.0%	277		EPP	44,670,810	28.9%	227	
EPP-ED	52,534,612	34.0%	277		ED	5,189,196	3.4%	37	
EPP-ED	52,534,612	34.0%	277		Independents	2,674,606	1.7%	13	
PES	37,271,453	24.1%	198		PES	36,716,593	23.8%	193	
PES	37,271,453	24.1%	198		Independents	554,860	0.4%	5	
ELDR	13,732,594	8.9%	66		ELDR	10,835,213	7.0%	59	
ELDR	13,732,594	8.9%	66		Independents	2,897,381	1.9%	7	
EUL/NGL	9,999,413	6.5%	41		PEL	5,512,904	3.6%	17	
EUL/NGL	9,999,413	6.5%	41		NGLA^{1}	623,401	0.4%	4	
EUL/NGL	9,999,413	6.5%	41		EACL²	529,782	0.3%	0	
EUL/NGL	9,999,413	6.5%	41		Independents	3,333,327	2.2%	20	
G/EFA	9,742,287	6.3%	40		EGP	8,290,609	5.4%	33	
G/EFA	9,742,287	6.3%	40		EFA	946,834	0.6%	4	
G/EFA	9,742,287	6.3%	40		Independents	504,844	0.3%	3	
NI	13,745,847	8.9%	68		Independents	13,745,847	8.9%	68	
UEN	6,141,614	4.0%	27		UEN	6,141,614	4.0%	27	
EDD	3,611,803	2.3%	15		ECPM^{3}	341,895	0.2%	1	
EDD	3,611,803	2.3%	15		Independents	3,269,908	2.1%	14	
Not elected	7,094,142	4.6%	0		Not elected	7,094,142	4.6%	0	
Total	154,317,718	100%	732		Total	154,317,718	100%	732	

Registered voters: 353,460,958 (est.)
Votes cast: 154,317,718 (43.66%) (est.)
Total seats: 732

Notes

1. The figures for the Nordic Green Left Alliance and the European Anticapitalist Left include only those members that are not full members of the Party of the European Left.
2. See above.

3. The figures for the European Christian Political Movement exclude a number of members who hold concurrent membership of the European Peoples Party.
Notes on accuracy:
- These estimated voting figures, using the believed configurations of EU groupings at the time of the 2004 elections, have been compiled by totalling national party figures, using official results where they are available.
- Where national lists are alliances between more than one political party, attempts have been made to divide that list proportionally, using preferential voting totals where available and, in other circumstances, dividing vote totals equally between candidates (if party membership available) or the MEPs elected (if not).

== Results by EU party (2007 notional result) ==
The notional results by EU party as at 8 January 2007 are as follows:

European Parliament Election 2004: Estimated notional results, January 2007
Group	Votes	% Votes	Seats	+/-	Party/Subgroup	Votes	% Votes	Seats	+/-
EPP-ED	52,567,771	34.1%	277	0	EPP	46,183,932	27.5%	232	+5
EPP-ED	52,567,771	34.1%	277	0	ED^{1}	5,628,052	3.3%	39	+2
EPP-ED	52,567,771	34.1%	277	0	Independents	755,786	1.6%	6	−7
PES	43,327,099	25.8%	218	+20	PES	41,598,383	24.7%	211	+18
PES	43,327,099	25.8%	218	+20	Independents	1,728,716	1.0%	7	+2
ALDE	21,375,247	12.7%	106	+40	ELDR	14,106,116	8.4%	76	+17
ALDE	21,375,247	12.7%	106	+40	EDP	6,037,453	3.6%	25	+25
ALDE	21,375,247	12.7%	106	+40	Independents	1,231,678	0.7%	5	−2
EUL/NGL	9,873,587	5.9%	41	0	PEL	6,842,489	4.1%	28	+10
EUL/NGL	9,873,587	5.9%	41	0	NGLA²	623,401	0.4%	4	0
EUL/NGL	9,873,587	5.9%	41	0	EACL^{3}	345,962	0.2%	0	0
EUL/NGL	9,873,587	5.9%	41	0	Independents	2,061,735	1.2%	9	−10
G/EFA	10,182,153	6.1%	42	+2	EGP	8,457,969	5.0%	33	0
G/EFA	10,182,153	6.1%	42	+2	EFA	1,277,042	0.8%	6	+2
G/EFA	10,182,153	6.1%	42	+2	Paul van Buitenen	174,578	0.1%	1	
G/EFA	10,182,153	6.1%	42	+2	Independents	272,564	0.2%	2	−1
NI	10,218,366	6.1%	14	-54	Hans-Peter Martin	262,272	0.2%	1	1
NI	10,218,366	6.1%	14	-54	Roger Helmer	185,681	0.1%	1	1
NI	10,218,366	6.1%	14	-54	Jim Allister	175,761	0.1%	1	1
NI	10,218,366	6.1%	14	-54	Independents	1,658,374	1.0%	11	−57
UEN	8,934,925	5.3%	44	+17	AEN	5,457,115	3.2%	26	+26
UEN	8,934,925	5.3%	44	+17	EUD^{4}	547,318	0.3%	5	+5
UEN	8,934,925	5.3%	44	+17	Independents	2,980,491	1.8%	13	−14
IND/DEM	5,265,991	3.1%	23	+8	ADIE^{5}	1,687,718	1.0%	7	7
IND/DEM	5,265,991	3.1%	23	+8	ECPM^{6}	341,895	0.2%	1	0
IND/DEM	5,265,991	3.1%	23	+8	EUD^{7}	294,887	0.2%	2	2
IND/DEM	5,265,991	3.1%	23	+8	Independents	2,941,491	1.7%	13	−1
ITS	6,135,671	3.6%	20	0	Euronat^{8}	5,465,545	3.2%	17	0
ITS	6,135,671	3.6%	20	0	Ashley Mote	215,556	0.1%	1	0
ITS	6,135,671	3.6%	20	0	Independents	454,570	0.3%	2	0
Not elected	8,107,746	4.8%	0		Not elected	8,107,746	4.8%	0	
Total	168,222,513	100%	785	+53	Total	168,222,513	100%	785	+53

Registered voters: 378,106,633 (est.)
Votes cast: 168,317,718 (44.49%) (est.)
Total seats: 785 (+53)

Notes

1. Roger Helmer was expelled from the EPP-ED group in 2005, but retains the whip of the British Conservative Party.
2. The figures for the Nordic Green Left Alliance and the European Anticapitalist Left include only those members that are not full members of the Party of the European Left.
3. See 2 above.
4. The EUDemocrats, while having a preference for the IND/DEM group, is currently split between UEN and IND/DEM.
5. In addition to the majority of AIDE MEPs which sit in the IND/DEM group, AIDE also includes Non-Inscrit MEP, Jim Allister, as an individual member.
6. The figures for the European Christian Political Movement exclude a number of members who hold concurrent membership of the European Peoples Party.
7. See 4 above.

8. These figures include parties listed on the Euronat page which appear to have links with Euronat short of full membership.
Other notes
- These figures estimate 'notional' voting figures based on changes in the configuration of EU political groupings since the 2004 elections and the accession of Bulgaria and Romania. Their purpose is to better estimate the position which the groups will have to defend for the next European Parliament election.
- These figures incorporate the results of the 2004 Romanian Chamber of Deputies election and the 2005 Bulgarian National Assembly election, on which the distribution of Bulgarian and Romanian MEPs is temporarily based. These figures will consequentially change after the 2007 European Parliament elections in those countries.
- These figures include the ITS group.

== New parties in the 2004 election ==
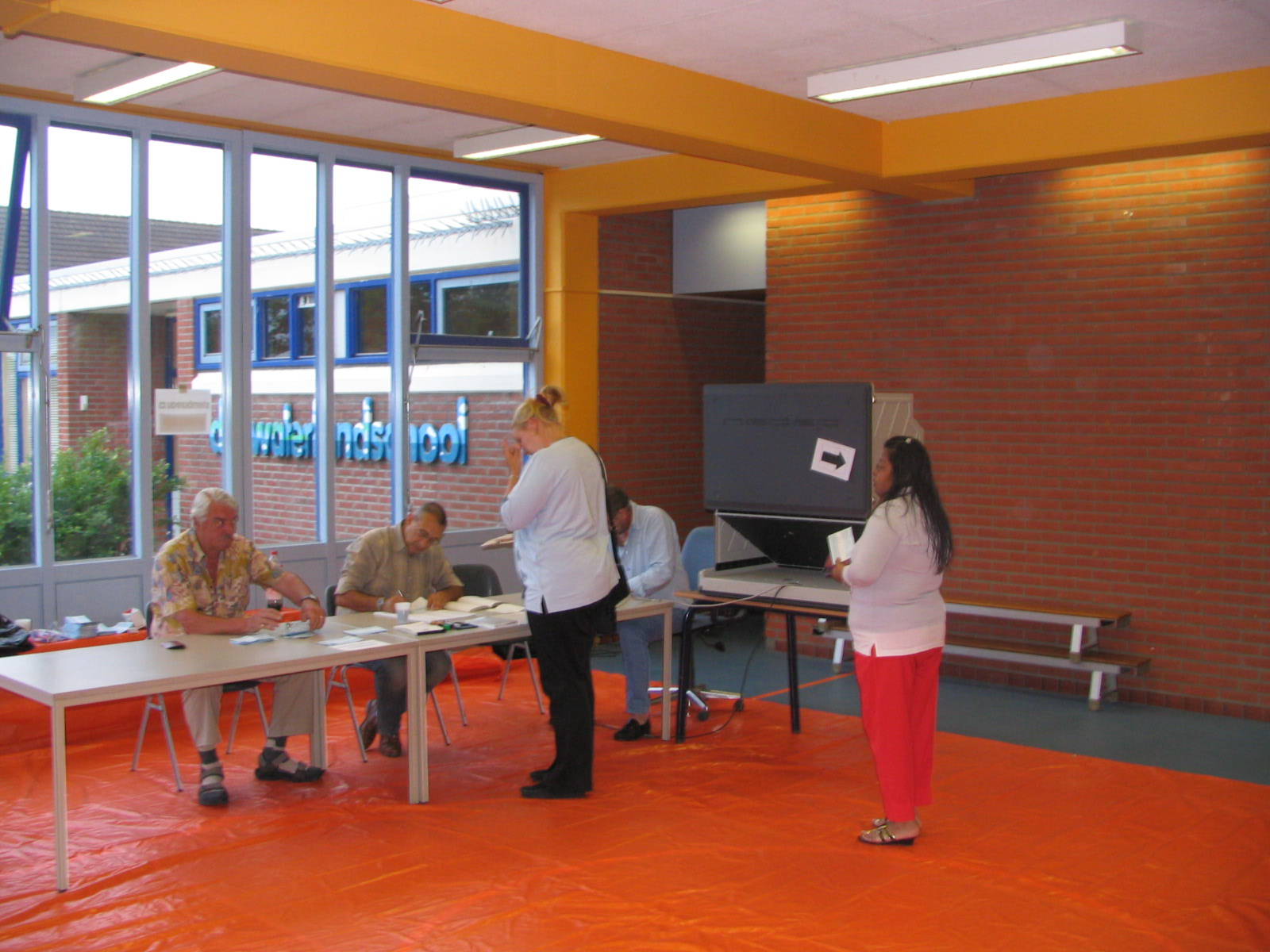
Voting in the election, in the Netherlands

- In the United Kingdom, RESPECT The Unity Coalition was established to fight this election with the intention to use it as a springboard for a campaign against Tony Blair's government. The English Democrats party appeared in England for the first time in 5 of the 9 English Constituencies, campaigning for an English Parliament and against English 'European' regions.
- A European Union-wide political party, the European Greens, was established in Rome on 21 February 2004 to contest this election.
- Swedish Junilistan (the June list) formed early in the year, meant to provide social democratic and right wing voters an EU sceptic alternative.
- In the Netherlands Europa Transparant of Paul van Buitenen got two seats.
- In Austria the Liste Hans-Peter Martin obtained two seats. A temporary leftist coalition known as the Left List campaigned, but did not win any seats.

== New inclusion ==
Gibraltar participated as a result of the judgement in Matthews v. United Kingdom

== Political group reshuffle after the 2004 election ==
- Liberals: The European Liberal Democrat and Reform Party created a new grouping by allying with MEPs from the French party Union for French Democracy (previously part of the EPP-ED), the Margherita Party (Italy) (previously part of the EPP-ED), other Italian members, the Lithuanian Labour Party and the Belgian MR-MCC (previously EPP-ED). The new allies formed the EDP and a new combined group, between the ELDR and the EDP, was formed with the name ALDE: the Alliance of Liberals and Democrats for Europe.
- Eurosceptics: Sweden's Junilistan, the anti-abortion League of Polish Families, and the French Combats Souverainistes joined the existing Europe of Democracies and Diversities group, which already included the UK Independence Party (UKIP). The group renamed itself Independence and Democracy (ID).

== See also ==
- List of members of the European Parliament (2004–2009)

=== Concurrent elections ===
- Belgium: regional elections
- Germany: 2004 Thuringian state election
- (Republic of Ireland) Ireland: local elections
- Italy: 2004 Sardinian regional election
- Lithuania: presidential election
- Luxembourg: general elections
- United Kingdom: local elections
