= 2003 Gibraltar general election =

- 28 November 2003

15 of the 17 seats in the House of Assembly 8 seats needed for a majority
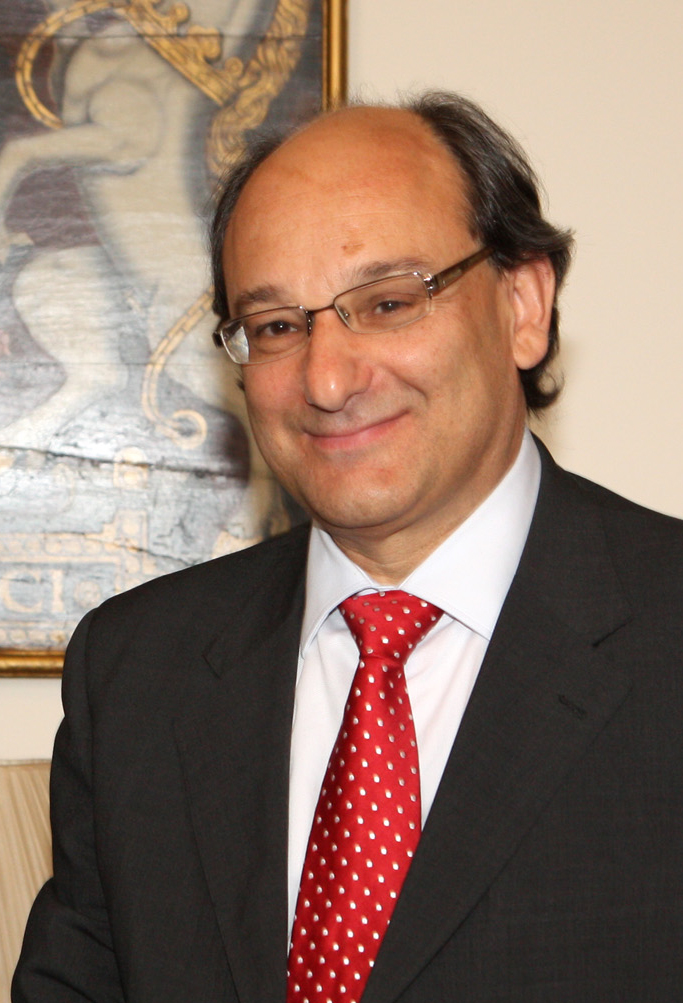

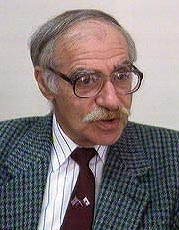
	Majority party	Minority party
Leader	Peter Caruana	Joe Bossano
Party	Social Democrats	Socialist Labour
Alliance		GSLP–Liberal
Last election	58.35%, 8 seats	40.57%, 7 seats
Seats won	8	7
Seat change	Steady	Steady
Popular vote	58,234	44,920
Percentage	51.45%	39.69%
Swing	▼6.90pp	▼0.88pp
Chief Minister before election
Peter Caruana
Social Democrats
Elected Chief Minister
Peter Caruana
Social Democrats

General elections were held in Gibraltar on 28 November 2003. They were won by Peter Caruana's Gibraltar Social Democrats (GSD), who received over 50% of the popular vote and won eight of the 15 elected seats, making this their third successive win.

== Coalitions ==
A coalition was formed between the Gibraltar Socialist Labour Party (GSLP) and Liberal Party of Gibraltar (GLP) called the GSLP–Liberal Alliance in order to combat the GSD. The Alliance was led by Joe Bossano.

== Party platforms ==
=== GSD ===
The GSD had its main focus on international relations, improvement of housing, improvement of infrastructure, and improvement of social services. They also stated that they were working towards making Gibraltar something the people could be proud of again.

=== GSLP-Liberal Alliance ===
The Alliance sought to counter the GSD party and, according to their 2003 manifesto, to improve housing, education, social affairs, services for senior citizens, medical services, employment, the general economy, businesses, tourism, transport, foreign affairs, services for the youth, services for sports, and the environment. They hoped to achieve those goals by the 2007 general election.

== Legend ==
Party or alliance	Slogan
GSD	"Security, Stability, Prosperity"
GSLP/Libs Alliance	"Our Contract with Gibraltar"
GLP	
Lyana Armstrong-Emery (RG)	
Maurice Xiberras	

== Incumbent MPs ==
Incumbent Members of Parliament from the 2000 election:

MP	Party	Seeking re-election?	Parliamentary role(s)
Peter Caruana (since 1991) (Note: Elected in 1991 by-election after the resignation of former AACR MP and Founder and first GSD Leader, Peter Montegriffo. He had beaten his opponent, AACR's Douglas Henrich (2496 vs 1542 votes).)	GSD	Yes	Chief Minister (since 1996)
Bernard Linares (since 1996)	GSD	Yes	Minister for Education, Training, Culture and Health
Keith Azopardi (since 1996)	GSD	No	Minister for Trade, Industry and Telecommunications (2000–2003)
Joseph Holliday (since 1996)	GSD	Yes	Minister for Employment & Training and Buildings & Works
Ernest Britto (since 1996)	GSD	Yes	Minister for Public Services, the Environment, Sports and Leisure (February–September 2000); Minister for Public Services, the Environment, Sport and Youth (2000–2003)
Hubert Corby (since 1996)	GSD	No	Minister for Employment and Consumer Affairs (2000–2003)
Jaime Netto (since 1996)	GSD	Yes	Minister for Housing
Yvette Del Agua (since 2000)	GSD	Yes	Minister for Social Affairs
Joe Bossano (since 1972)	GSLP–Liberal Alliance (GSLP)	Yes	Leader of the Opposition (since 1996)
Joseph Garcia (since 1999) (Note: Elected in 1999 by-election after the death of elected GSLP MP and Shadow Minister & former Mayor of Gibraltar, Robert Mor)	GSLP–Liberal Alliance (LPG)	Yes	Shadow Minister
Joseph Baldachino (since 1984)	GSLP–Liberal Alliance (GSLP)	No	Shadow Minister
Maria Montegriffo (since 1984)	GSLP–Liberal Alliance (GSLP)	Yes	Shadow Minister
Reginald Valarino (1976–1988, since 2000)	GSLP–Liberal Alliance (GSLP)	No	Shadow Minister
Juan Carlos Perez (since 1988)	GSLP–Liberal Alliance (GSLP)	No	Shadow Minister
Steven Linares (since 2000)	GSLP–Liberal Alliance (LPG)	Yes	Shadow Minister

== Results ==
Party or alliance		Votes	%	Seats	+/–
Gibraltar Social Democrats		58,234	51.45	8	0
Alliance	Gibraltar Socialist Labour Party	28,382	25.08	5	–2
Alliance	Liberal Party of Gibraltar	16,538	14.61	2	New
Alliance	Total	44,920	39.69	7	0
Gibraltar Labour Party		9,445	8.35	0	New
Reform Party		578	0.51	0	New
Ex officio members				2	–
Total		113,177	100.00	17	0
Total votes		14,610	–		
Registered voters/turnout		18,452	79.18		
Source: Parliament, Parliament

=== By candidate ===
Candidate		Party	Votes	Notes
	Peter Caruana	GSD	7998	Elected
	Joseph Holliday	GSD	7398	Elected
	Bernard Linares	GSD	7301	Elected
	Ernest Britto	GSD	7275	Elected
	James Netto	GSD	7117	Elected
	Fabian Vinet	GSD	7105	Elected
	Clive Beltran	GSD	7037	Elected
	Yvette Del Agua	GSD	7003	Elected
	Joseph Bossano	GSLP–Liberal Alliance (GSLP)	6220	Elected
	Joseph Garcia	GSLP–Liberal Alliance (LPG)	5798	Elected
	Fabian Picardo	GSLP–Liberal Alliance (GSLP)	5785	Elected
	Charles Bruzon	GSLP–Liberal Alliance (GSLP)	5584	Elected
	Steven Linares	GSLP–Liberal Alliance (LPG)	5554	Elected
	Maria Montegriffo	GSLP–Liberal Alliance (GSLP)	5465	Elected
	Lucio Randall	GSLP–Liberal Alliance (GSLP)	5328	Elected
	Steven Marin	GSLP–Liberal Alliance (GSLP)	5168	Not Elected
N	Daniel Feetham	GLP	2171	Not Elected
	Maurice Xiberras	Independent	1395	Not Elected
	Charles Bishop	GLP	1125	Not Elected
	Christian Montegriffo	GLP	1034	Not Elected
	Joseph Bishop	GLP	1026	Not Elected
	William Pisani	GLP	920	Not Elected
	Kim Karnani Santos	GLP	908	Not Elected
	Louise Gillingwater Pederson	GLP	866	Not Elected
	Lyana Armstrong-Emery	RP	578	Not Elected
