= 2009 European Parliament election in Gibraltar =

← 2004	4 June 2009	2014 →

Contributes towards 6 seats to the European Parliament

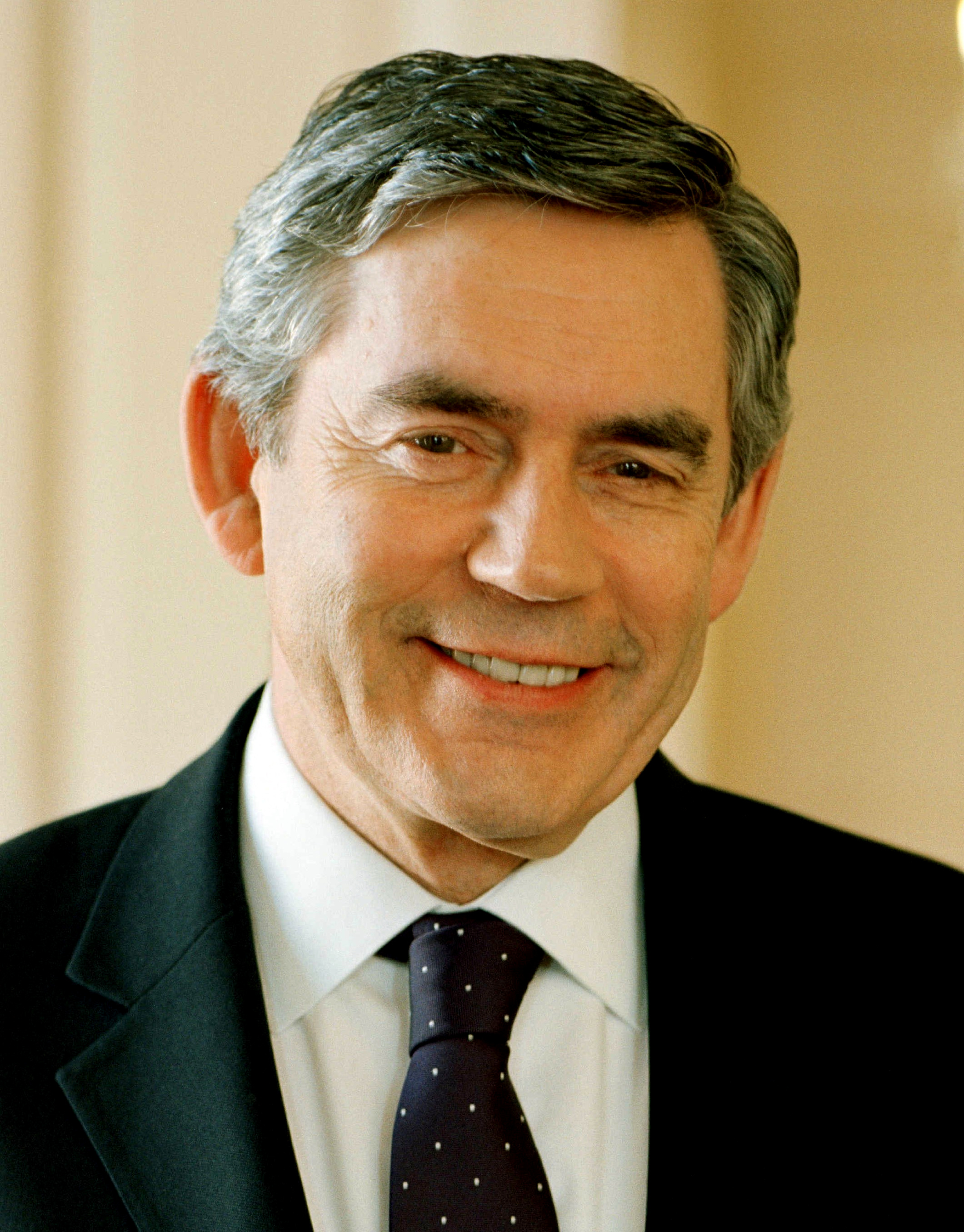

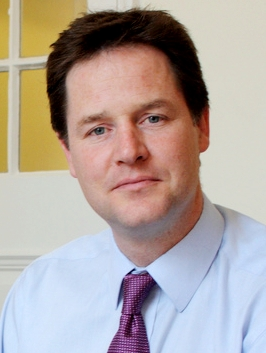
	First party	Second party	Third party
Leader	David Cameron	Gordon Brown	Nick Clegg
Party	Conservative	Labour	Liberal Democrats
Alliance	Social Democrats	Socialist Labour	Liberal
Leader since	6 December 2005	24 June 2007	18 December 2007
Popular vote	3,721	1,328	1,269
Percentage	53.30%	19.02%	18.18%
Swing	▼17.37pp	▲9.42pp	▲10.47pp

European Parliament elections were held in the British Overseas Territory of Gibraltar (which formed part of the European Parliament constituency of South West England and Gibraltar) on 4 June 2009, with the results announced on 7 June 2009. The Conservatives won with 51% of the votes. Turnout was 35% in Gibraltar, below the 39% for the electoral region as a whole. The turnout in the territory was significantly lower than the percentage from 2004, which was 58%.

== Results ==
Party	Votes	%
Conservative Party	3,721	53.30
Labour Party	1,328	19.02
Liberal Democrats	1,269	18.18
Green Party	224	3.21
UKIP	100	1.43
British National Party	94	1.35
Christian Party	70	1.00
Socialist Labour Party	56	0.80
English Democrats	37	0.53
Pensioners Party	26	0.37
Independent – Katie Hopkins	15	0.21
No2EU	12	0.17
Mebyon Kernow	8	0.11
Fair Pay Fair Trade	8	0.11
Jury Team	6	0.09
Wai D Your Decision	4	0.06
Pro Democracy	3	0.04
Total	6,981	100.00
Valid votes	6,981	97.42
Invalid/blank votes	185	2.58
Total votes	7,166	100.00
Registered voters/turnout	20,413	35.11
Source: Gibraltar Chronicle, Parliament
