= 2000 Gibraltar general election =

- 10 February 2000

15 seats in the House of Assembly 8 seats needed for a majority
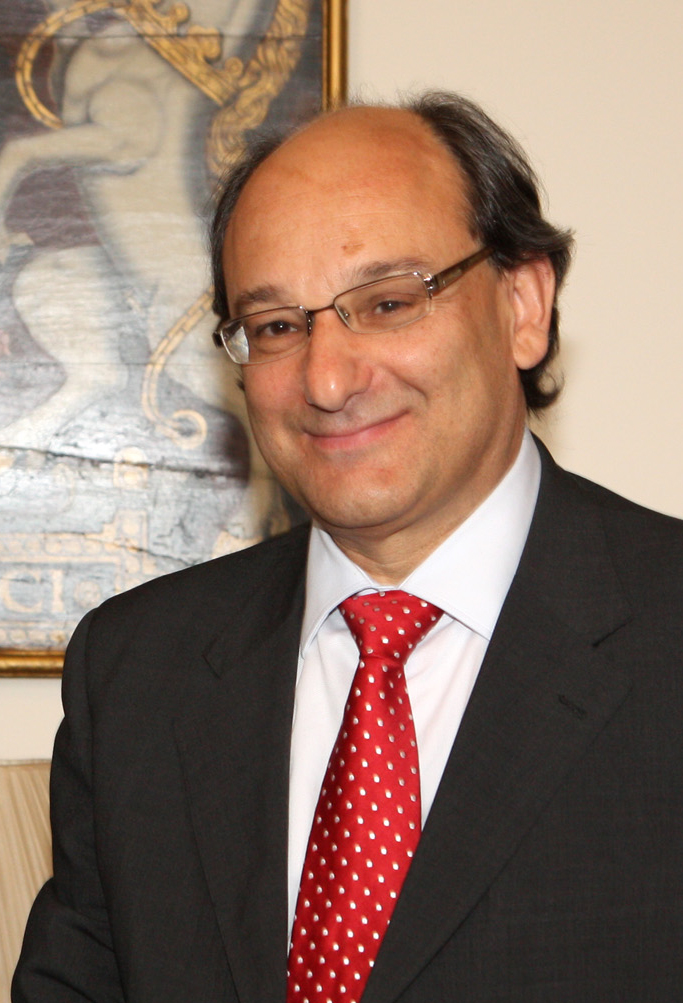

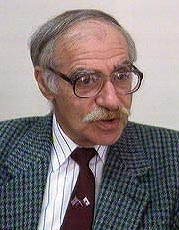
	Majority party	Minority party
Leader	Peter Caruana	Joe Bossano (GSLP)
Party	Social Democrats	GSLP–Liberal
Seats won	8	7
Popular vote	67,443	46,896
Percentage	58.35%	40.57%
Chief Minister before election
Peter Caruana
Social Democrats
Elected Chief Minister
Peter Caruana
Social Democrats

General elections were held in Gibraltar in 2000. They were won by the ruling Gibraltar Social Democrats (GSD), which received over 50% of the popular vote and won eight of the fifteen seats.

== Party slogans and election logos ==
Party or alliance	Slogan
GSD	"GSD-It Makes Sense"
GSLP/Libs Alliance	"A new deal for Gibraltar"
Lyana Armstrong-Emery	
Peter Cumming	

=== Incumbent MPs (from 1996) ===
Candidate	Party	Seeking re-election?	Parliamentary role(s)
Peter Montegriffo (1988-1991; since 1996)	GSD	No	Minister for Trade & Industry
Peter Caruana (since 1991) (Note: Elected in 1991 by-election after the resignation of former AACR MP and Founder and first GSD Leader, Peter Montegriffo. He had beaten his opponent, AACR's Douglas Henrich (2496 vs 1542 votes).)	GSD	Yes	Chief Minister
Bernard Linares	GSD	Yes	Minister for Education, the Disabled, Youth & Consumer Affairs (1996–1999); Minister for Education, Training, Culture and Youth (1999–2000)
Hurbert Corby (since 1992)	GSD	Yes	Minister for Social Affairs
Keith Azopardi	GSD	Yes	Minister for the Environment and Health
Joe Holliday	GSD	Yes	Minister for Tourism, Commercial Affairs and the Port (1996–1999); Minister for Tourism and Transport (1999–2000)
Ernest Britto (since 1992)	GSD	Yes	Minister for Government Services and Sport
Jaime Netto	GSD	Yes	Minister for Employment & Training and Buildings & Works
Joe Bossano (since 1972)	GSLP-Liberal Alliance (GSLP) (since 1980)	Yes	Leader of the Opposition
Joseph Baldachino (since 1988)	GSLP–Liberal Alliance (GSLP)	Yes	Shadow Minister
Maria Montegriffo (since 1984)	GSLP–Liberal Alliance (GSLP)	Yes	Shadow Minister
Albert Isola	GSLP–Liberal Alliance (GSLP)	No	Shadow Minister
Joshua Gabay	GSLP–Liberal Alliance (GSLP)	No	Shadow Minister
Juan Carlos Perez	GSLP–Liberal Alliance (GSLP)	Yes	Shadow Minister
Joseph Garcia (Note: Elected in 1999 by-election after the death of elected GSLP MP and Shadow Minister & former Mayor of Gibraltar, Robert Mor)	GSLP–Liberal Alliance (LPG)	Yes	Shadow Minister for Tourism and Consumer Affairs (1999–2000)

== Results ==
Party	Votes	%	Seats	+/–
Gibraltar Social Democrats	67,443	58.35	8	0
GSLP–Liberal Alliance	46,896	40.57	7	0
Independents	1,250	1.08	0	0
Total	115,589	100.00	15	0
Total votes	14,936	–		
Registered voters/turnout	17,874	83.56		
Source: Gibraltar Elections, Parliament

=== By candidate ===
The first fifteen candidates were elected to the House of Assembly.

#	Party	Candidate	Votes
6	GSD	CARUANA, Peter Richard	8747
13	GSD	LINARES, Bernard Anthony	8700
2	GSD	AZOPARDI, Keith	8523
12	GSD	HOLLIDAY, Joseph John	8404
5	GSD	BRITTO, Ernest Michael	8361
7	GSD	CORBY, Hubert Alfred	8275
16	GSD	NETTO, James Joseph	8250
10	GSD	DEL AGUA, Yvette	8183
4	GSLP/Liberal	BOSSANO, Joseph John	6287
11	GSLP/Liberal	GARCIA, Joseph John	5911
3	GSLP/Liberal	BALDACHINO, Joseph Louis	5897
15	GSLP/Liberal	MONTEGRIFFO, Maria Isabel	5813
18	GSLP/Liberal	VALARINO, Reginald G	5808
17	GSLP/Liberal	PEREZ, Juan Carlos	5805
14	GSLP/Liberal	LINARES, Steven Ernest	5727
9	GSLP/Liberal	DARYANANI, Vijay	5648
1	IND	ARMSTRONG-EMERY, Lyana Patricia	645
8	IND	CUMMING, Peter Andrew	605
Source: Gibraltar Elections
