= Gibraltar Labour Party =

- Leader: Daniel Feetham
- Founded: 2003; 22 years ago
- Dissolved: 2005; 20 years ago
- Merged into: Gibraltar Social Democrats
- Ideology: Progressivism; British unionism
- Political position: Centre

The Gibraltar Labour Party was a political party in Gibraltar. They described themselves as an integrationist party and stated that their formation was prompted by the need for a strong opposition to the government. They were founded and led by Daniel Feetham and former Leader of the Opposition and integrationist, Maurice Xiberras.

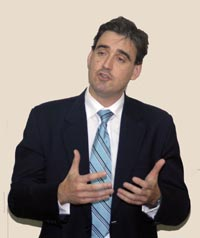
Ex-leader of the Gibraltar Labour Party, Daniel Feetham

They opposed dialogue with Spain and wanted to change the Constitution of Gibraltar, and support the right of Gibraltarians to decide their own constitutional arrangements under the principle of self-determination. They were also in favour of devolved integration with the United Kingdom, whereby Gibraltar would keep its internal political and fiscal autonomy but via an Act of Union would form part of the United Kingdom.

They had proposed policies for the improvement of the quality and availability of housing in Gibraltar. They proposed that no individual should serve as Chief Minister for more than two terms, and called for a more transparent form of funding of political parties.

== Elections ==
In the 2003 General Election to the Gibraltar House of Assembly, the party won 9,445 votes (or 8.0% of the popular vote) and no seats. This is the largest number of votes (in terms of both percentage and actual number of votes) for a Gibraltarian political party that has not won a seat in the Legislature throughout its electoral history.

== Election results ==
=== Parliament of Gibraltar ===
Election year	# of overall votes	% of overall vote	# of overall seats won	±
2003	9,445	8.0	0 / 15	New

== Merger ==
In 2005, the Labour Party merged with the governing Gibraltar Social Democrats, retaining the GSD name and leadership. In 2013 Daniel Feetham became the leader of the Gibraltar Social Democrats and Leader of the Opposition.
