= 2004 European Parliament election in Austria =

- 13 June 2004

18 seats to the European Parliament
- Turnout: 42.43% (▼6.97 pp)
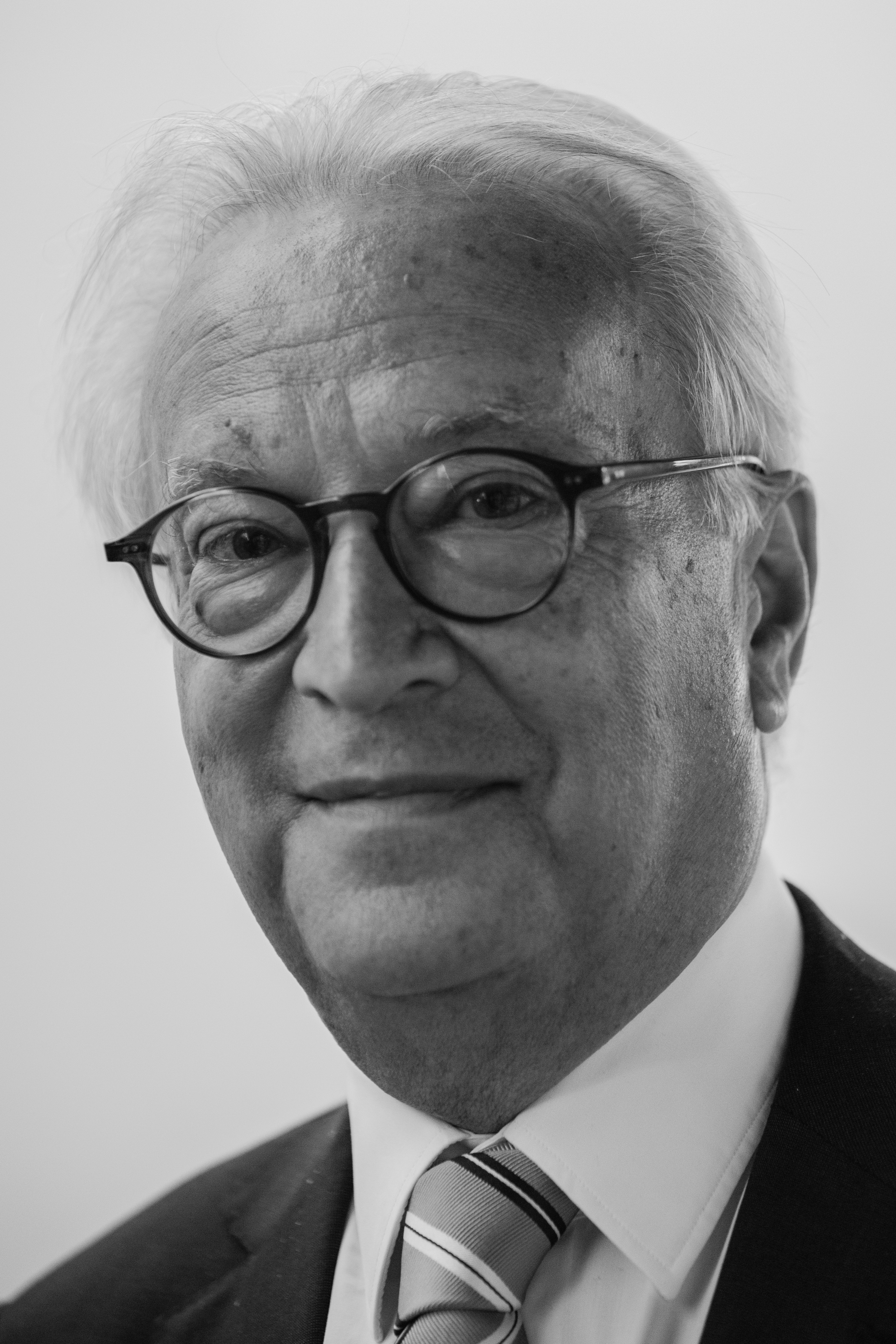

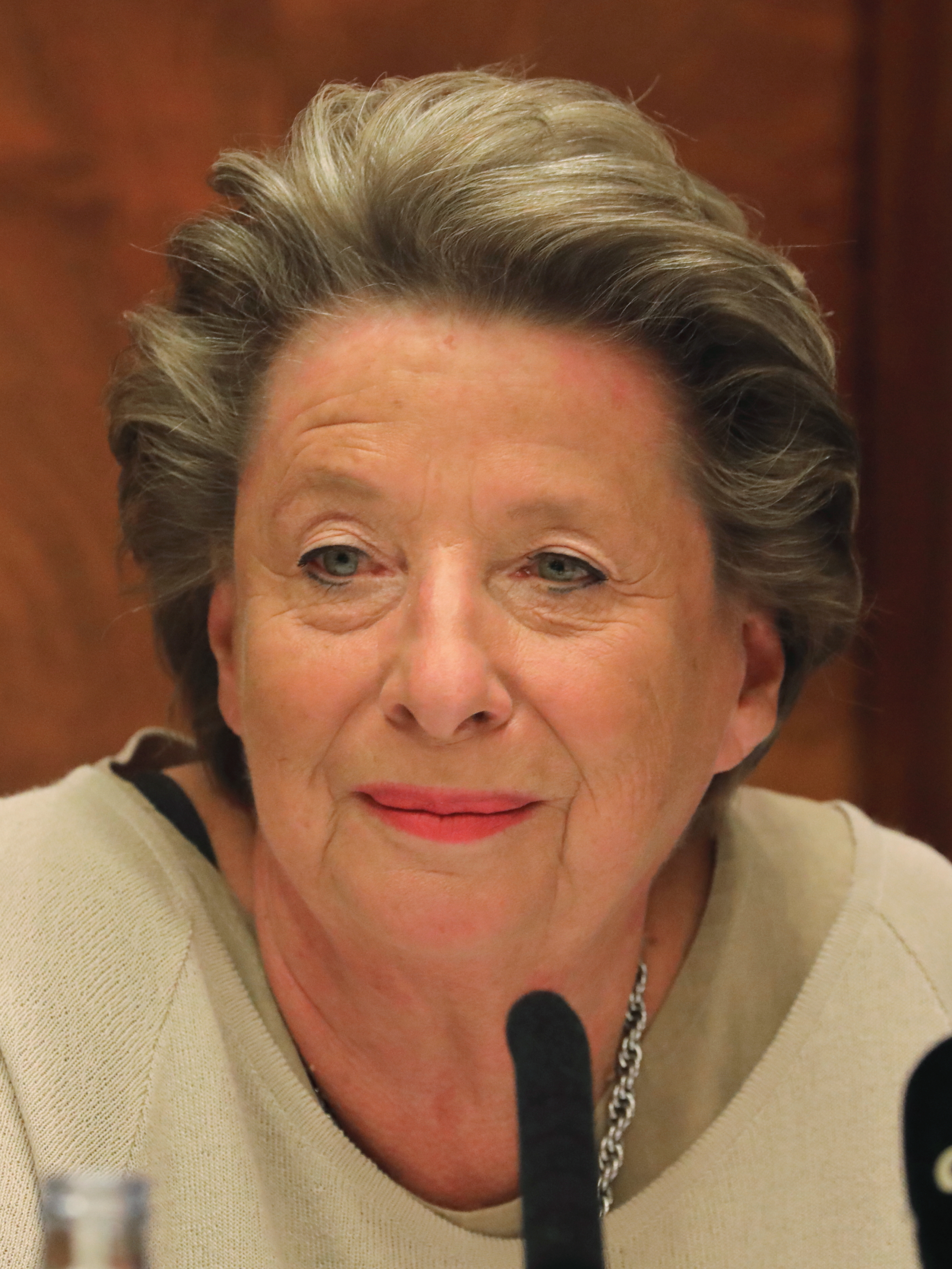

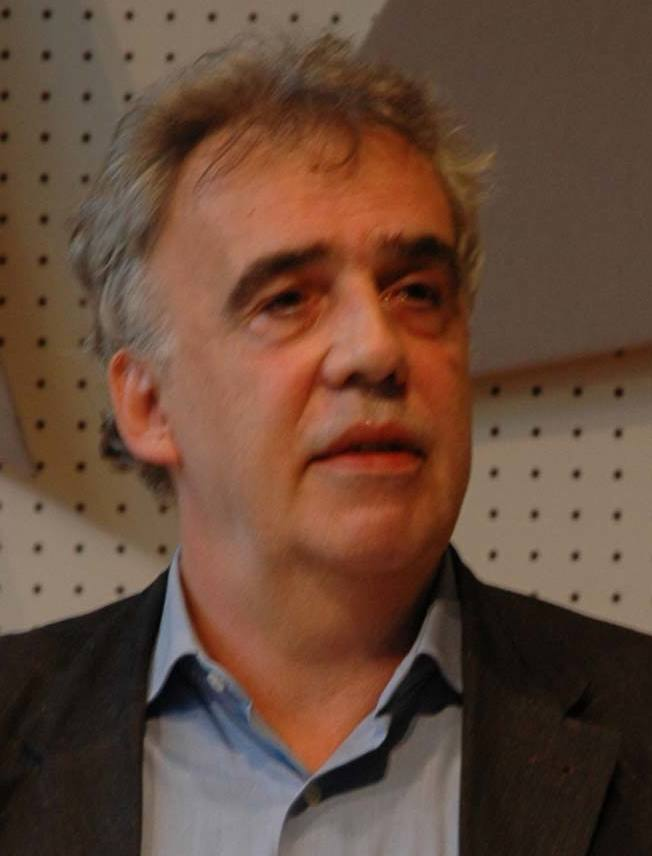

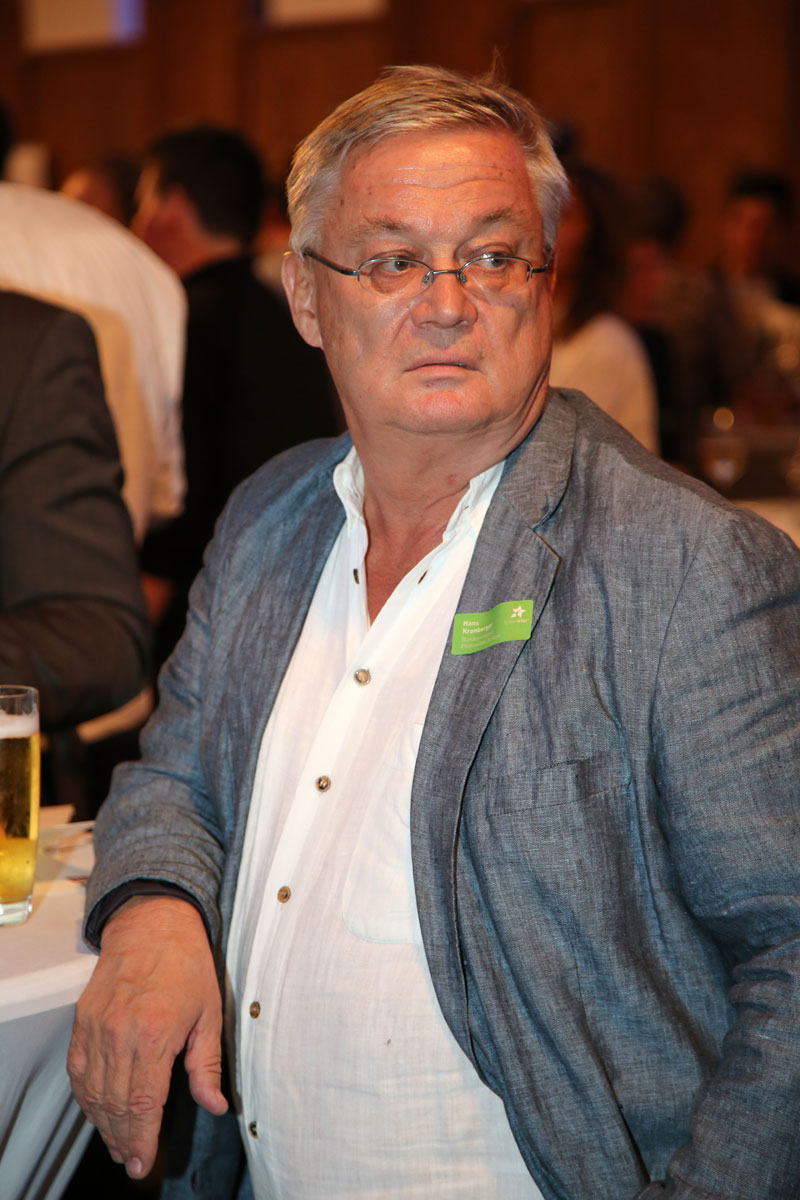
	First party	Second party	Third party
Leader	Johannes Swoboda	Ursula Stenzel	Hans-Peter Martin
Party	SPÖ	ÖVP	Hans-Peter Martin's List
Alliance	PES	EPP
Last election	31.71%, 7 seats	7 seats, 30.67%	–
Seats won	7	6	2
Seat change	Steady	▼1	New
Popular vote	833,517	817,716	349,696
Percentage	33.33%	32.70%	13.98%
Swing	▲1.62pp	▲2.03pp	New
	Fourth party	Fifth party
Leader	Johannes Voggenhuber	Johann Kronberger (lost seat)
Party	Greens	FPÖ
Alliance	European Greens
Last election	9.29%, 2 seats	23.40%, 5 seats
Seats won	2	1
Seat change	Steady	▼4
Popular vote	322,429	157,722
Percentage	12.89%	6.31%
Swing	▲3.60pp	▼17.09pp

An election was held on 13 June 2004 to elect MEPs representing the Austria constituency for the 2004–2009 term of the European Parliament. It was part of the wider 2004 European election.

The parties of the left, the Austrian Social Democratic Party and the Greens, improved their share of the vote. The ruling conservative party, the Austrian People's Party, also improved its share, but this was at the expense of its coalition partner, the Austrian Freedom Party, whose vote dropped sharply. The anti-corruption campaigner Hans-Peter Martin polled strongly and his list won two seats.

== Results ==
Party	Votes	%	Seats	+/–
Social Democratic Party of Austria	833,517	33.33	7	0
Austrian People's Party	817,716	32.70	6	–1
Hans-Peter Martin's List	349,696	13.98	2	New
The Greens – The Green Alternative	322,429	12.89	2	0
Freedom Party of Austria	157,722	6.31	1	–4
Opposition for a Europe of Solidarity (Left List)	19,530	0.78	0	New
Total	2,500,610	100.00	18	–3
Valid votes	2,500,610	97.43		
Invalid/blank votes	66,029	2.57		
Total votes	2,566,639	100.00		
Registered voters/turnout	6,049,129	42.43		
