= 2004 European Parliament election in Gibraltar =

- 10 June 2004

7 seats in the European Parliament
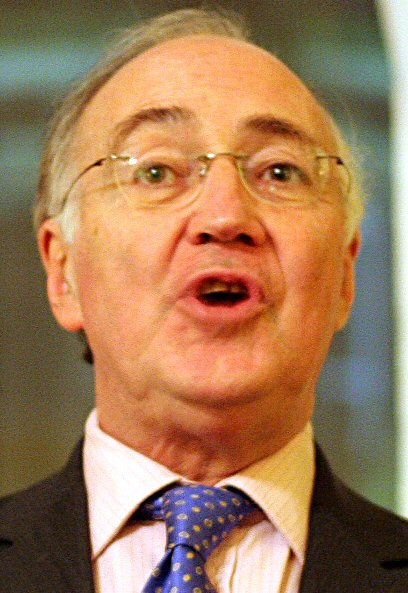

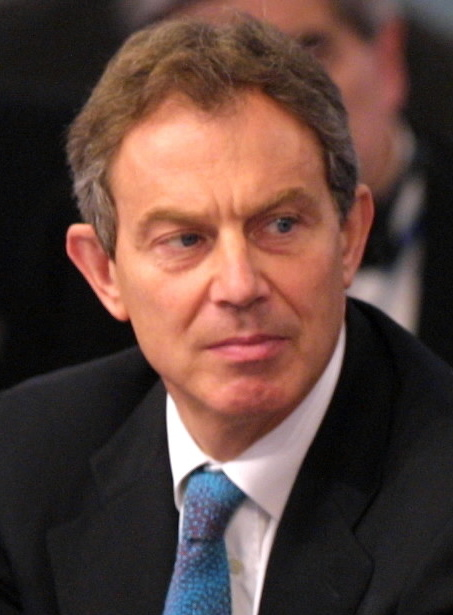

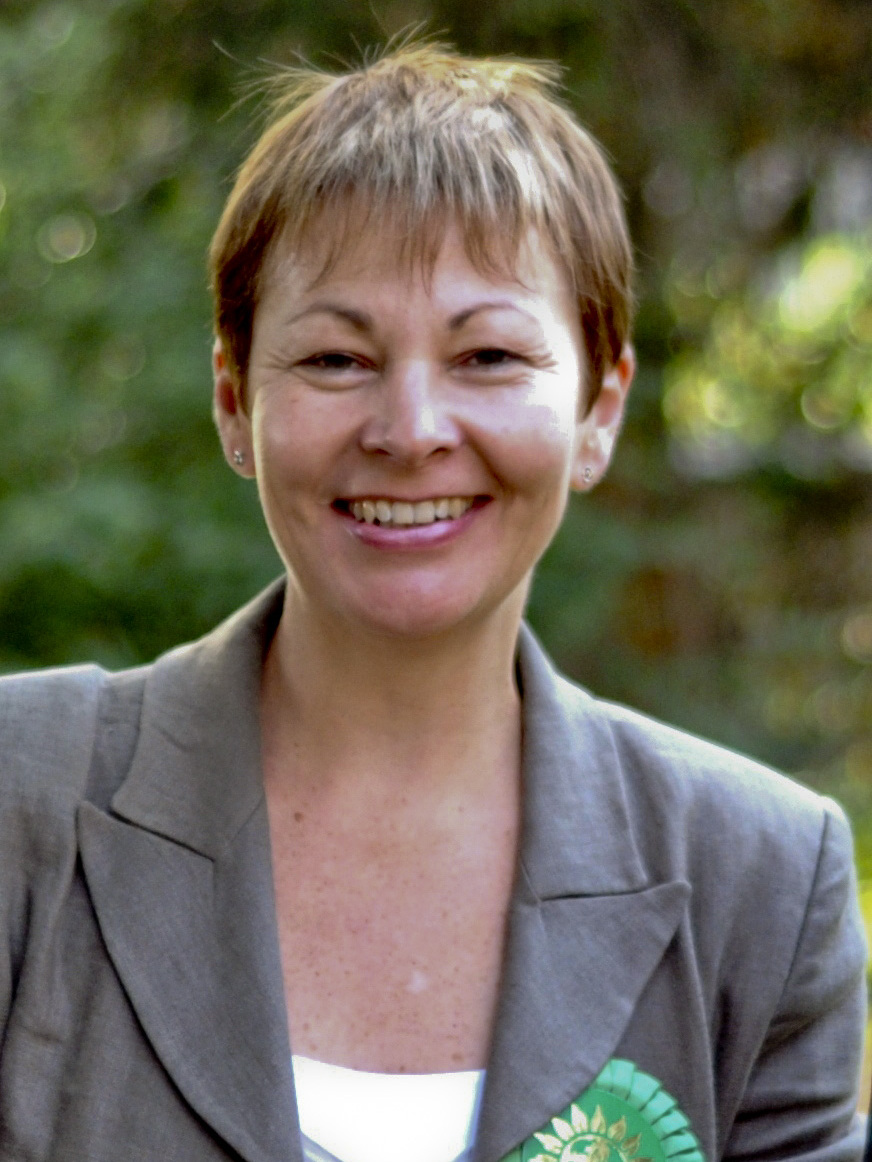

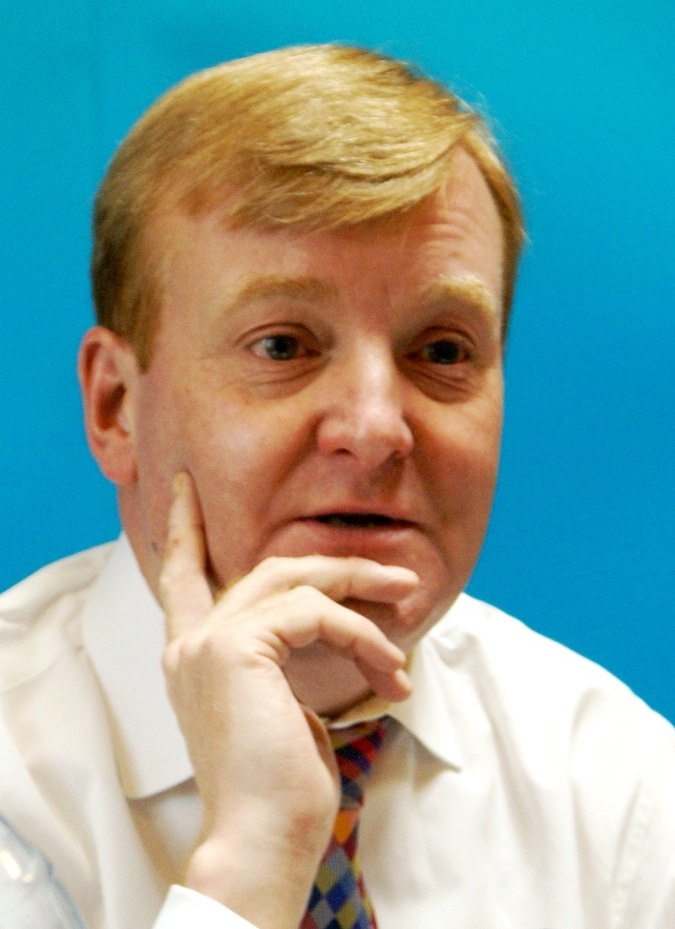
	First party	Second party
Leader	Michael Howard	Tony Blair
Party	Conservative	Labour
Alliance	Social Democrats	Socialist Labour
Leader since	6 November 2003	21 July 1994
Popular vote	8,297	1,127
Percentage	70.67%	9.60%
EP group	ED, within EPP-ED	PES
	Third party	Fourth party
Leader	Caroline Lucas	Charles Kennedy
Party	Green	Liberal Democrats
Alliance	Reform	Liberal
Leader since	30 November 2003	9 August 1999
Popular vote	1,058	905
Percentage	9.01%	7.71%
EP group	Greens–EFA	ALDE

European Parliament elections were held for the first time in Gibraltar on 10 June 2004 as part of European Union-wide elections. Although part of the European Union, Gibraltar had never before voted in European Parliamentary elections, in part due to its small electorate of just over 20,000 which would cause Gibraltar to be over-represented by about 30 times if even a single seat were to be assigned.

This disenfranchisement applied by the United Kingdom was successfully challenged before the European Court of Human Rights in 1999. As a result, from 2004 Gibraltar was included by the United Kingdom within the South West England region for electoral purposes.

Spain took a complaint about Gibraltar participating in EU elections to the Court of Justice of the European Union, objecting to the enfranchisement of Commonwealth citizens and the creation of a combined electoral region, but its case was unsuccessful.

None of the main Gibraltar political parties contested the election, so voters chose from United Kingdom party lists. However, Lyana Armstrong-Emery of the small Reform Party had a place on a joint list with the Green Party.

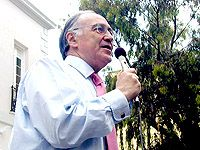
Michael Howard addresses voters outside the Gibraltar House of Assembly (now the Gibraltar Parliament).

The Conservative Party polled over two-thirds of the Gibraltar vote, with no other party exceeding 10% support. This was in large part due to the perception that the Labour Government in Britain had "betrayed" Gibraltar by attempting to negotiate a constitutional settlement involving joint sovereignty with Spain. This arrangement was rejected overwhelmingly by Gibraltarians in the 2002 sovereignty referendum. The Conservatives were perceived as being unequivocal in their support for Gibraltar's continued British status. In addition, both the leader of the Conservative Party, Michael Howard, and his deputy, Michael Ancram, flew in to rally support. Before the election, the local Conservatives mounted a vigorous campaign.

== Results ==
Turnout was 57.5% in Gibraltar, higher than the 37.8% for the electoral region as a whole.

Party	Gibraltar		South West England		Seats
Party	Votes	%	Votes	%	Seats
Conservative Party	8,297	70.67	457,371	31.58	3
Labour Party	1,127	9.60	209,908	14.49	1
Green	1,058	9.01	103,821	7.17	0
Liberal Democrats	905	7.71	265,619	18.34	1
UKIP	140	1.19	326,784	22.56	2
British National Party	105	0.89	43,653	3.01	0
Countryside	88	0.75	30,824	2.13	0
Respect Party	20	0.17	10,473	0.72	0
Total	11,740	100.00	1,448,453	100.00	7
Valid votes	11,740	98.37	1,448,453	99.64	
Invalid/blank votes	194	1.63	5,208	0.36	
Total votes	11,934	100.00	1,453,661	100.00	
Registered voters/turnout	20,740	57.54	3,845,210	37.80	
Source: European Parliament
