= List of political parties in Gibraltar =

This article lists political parties in Gibraltar.

== Current parties ==
=== Active Gibraltarian parties ===
Name	Abbr.	Alliance	Ideology	Political position	British affiliation	Year founded	MPs	Status
Gibraltar Social Democrats	GSD	—N/a	Liberal conservatism	Centre-right	Conservatives	1989	8 / 17	Opposition
Gibraltar Socialist Labour Party	GSLP	GSLP–Liberal	Social democracy	Centre-left	Labour Party	1978	7 / 17	Government
Liberal Party of Gibraltar	Libs (or LPG)	GSLP–Liberal	Liberalism; Social liberalism	Centre-left	Liberal Democrats	1991	2 / 17	Government
Together Gibraltar	TG	—N/a	Progressivism	Centre to centre-left	none	2017 (as a movement); 2018 (as a party)	0 / 17	Extra-parliamentary (currently inactive)

=== Former British parties ===
- The British Conservative Party (local branch). A branch of the UK South West region party, which contested European Elections, where Gibraltar was part of the South West England constituency.
- UKIP Gibraltar - A branch of the UK Independence Party set up to promote UKIP in the European Elections and originally was to contest the 2015 General Election in Gibraltar

== Defunct parties ==
Name	Abbreviated	Political Ideology	Political Position	Year founded	Year Dissolved	Seats won (if applicable)
Progressive Democratic Party	PDP	Liberal conservatism / economic liberalism	Centre-right	2006	2013	-
Gibraltar Labour Party	GLP	Socialism / social democracy	Left-wing	2003	2005	-
Gibraltar Reform Party	GRP	Green politics / green socialism	Left-wing	2000	2005	-
Association for the Advancement of Civil Rights	AACR	Liberalism / civic nationalism / populism	Centre-left	1942	1992	7/15 (1969 and 1988); 8/15 (1972, 1976, 1980, 1984)
Democratic Party of British Gibraltar	DPBG	Conservatism / integrationism (Britain)	Right-wing	1976	1984	4/15 (1976; as the 'GDM'); 6/15 (1980)
Integration with Britain Party	IWBP	Integrationism (Britain)	Right-wing	1967	1976	5/15 (1969); 7/15 (1972)
Commonwealth Party	CWP	N/A	N/A	1956	1957	N/A
Party for the Autonomy of Gibraltar	PAG	Integrationism (Spain)	Right-wing	1977	1980s	-

== See also ==
- Lists of political parties
