= Joseph Garcia (Gibraltarian politician) =

Gibraltarian historian and politician

The Honourable Joseph John Garcia CMG MP
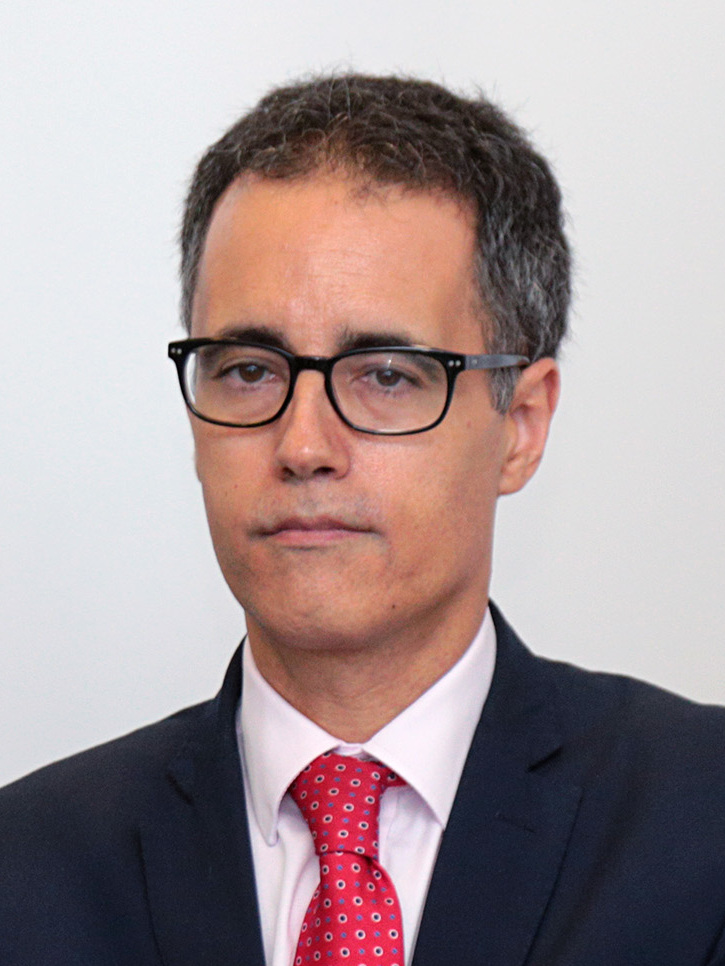
- Garcia in 2018

Deputy Chief Minister of Gibraltar
- Incumbent
- Assumed office 9 December 2011
- Monarchs: Elizabeth II; Charles III
- Governor: Sir Adrian Johns; Sir James Dutton; Edward Davis; Sir David Steel; Sir Ben Bathurst

Member of the Gibraltar Parliament
- Incumbent
- Assumed office 4 February 1999

Personal details
- Born: Gibraltar
- Party: Liberal Party of Gibraltar
- Children: 2
- Education: University of Hull
- Occupation: Politician
- Website: liberal.gi

Joseph John Andrew Garcia is a Gibraltarian historian and politician, and the current leader of the Liberal Party of Gibraltar (LPG) and Deputy Chief Minister of the Government of Gibraltar. The LPG holds two of the 17 seats in the Gibraltar Parliament after the 2023 general election and is in government with its political allies, the Gibraltar Socialist Labour Party (GSLP).

== Education ==
Garcia graduated from the University of Hull in England with a first class honours degree in history and obtained a doctorate on "The Political and Constitutional Development of Gibraltar".

== Political career ==
Garcia has been leader of the LPG since 1992 and was first elected to the then Gibraltar House of Assembly on a by-election. He served as Shadow Minister for Tourism and Commercial Affairs from 1999 to 2000. He was re-elected at the 2000 election and served as Shadow Minister for Trade, Industry, Tourism and Financial Services until 2003. In 2011 Garcia was appointed Vice-President of Liberal International. Garcia's party then formed a coalition to contest the 2003 election with the GSLP, which won five seats, re-electing Garcia to serve as Shadow Minister for Trade, Industry, Tourism and Heritage until 2007 when he was again re-elected at the 2007 election serving in the same Shadow Ministry.

After 12 years in opposition, Garcia was elected into Government following the election of 8 December 2011. The newly elected GSLP Chief Minister of Gibraltar, Fabian Picardo, appointed Garcia Deputy Chief Minister with responsibility for planning and lands, political, democratic and civic reform, and civil aviation.

During the general election campaign in 1996 Garcia ripped up the GSLP manifesto during a leaders debate programme on GBC. His party now forms the Government with the GSLP.

Garcia supported Panorama which was a daily newspaper in Gibraltar. His father Joe Garcia Snr. MBE (1938–2022) was the founder and editor of the paper until his death. He was succeeded by his sister, Lorraine Baldachino (until dissolution).

Garcia was appointed Companion of the Order of St Michael and St George (CMG) in the 2021 Birthday Honours for services to politics and public service in Gibraltar.

== See also ==
- List of Gibraltarians
- Politics of Gibraltar
