= Yvette Del Agua =

Gibraltarian legal executive and politician

Minister for Social Affairs
- In office 2000–2007
- Succeeded by: Samantha Sacramento

Minister for Health and Civil Protection
- In office 2007–2011
- Succeeded by: John Cortes

Personal details
- Born: Yvette Montegriffo; 21 October 1957 (age 68)
- Party: Gibraltar Social Democrats (GSD)
- Spouse: Clive Del Agua
- Children: 3
- Parent(s): Joseph and Lourdes Montegriffo
- Occupation: Legal executive
- Known for: Voice of Gibraltar Group

Yvette Del Agua is a Gibraltarian legal executive and former politician. She served as a Minister for the Government of Gibraltar from 2000 to 2011.

== Biography ==
Yvette Del Agua was born in Gibraltar on 21 October 1957, daughter to Joseph and Lourdes Montegriffo. She attended St. Mary's Infant School, Loreto High School and the Commercial & Secretarial School (Town Range). She started working at age 17 as a clerical assistant.

Del Agua married in 1976 to Clive Del Agua, with whom she had three daughters, Zillah, Danielle and Gail. For several years, she devoted herself entirely to their family, and only returned to work in 1983, when she was hired as a production secretary for the Gibraltar Broadcasting Corporation. Ten years later, she went to work for the law firm Marrache & Co Barristers and Solicitors. In 1999 she graduated as a legal executive, after four years of study at the Gibraltar College of Further Education.

Del Agua became spokesperson for the Voice of Gibraltar Group which was founded in 1996 by her husband Clive. She held the position until the 2000 Gibraltar general election, when she was first elected to the Gibraltar House of Assembly (now the Gibraltar Parliament) as a government minister for the Gibraltar Social Democrats (GSD), being appointed Minister for Social Affairs. Del Agua was re-elected at the 2003 and 2007 general elections, having only left government following the Gibraltar Socialist Labour Party-Liberal Party of Gibraltar alliance's victory at the 2011 general election.

== Controversies ==
During her long period as part of the GSD government, Del Agua was involved in several controversies. Among other things, she was accused of lack of respect for the rights of disabled people, lying about the numbers of the children's dental care program and neglecting the working conditions of prison wardens as well as the escape of inmates in custody at HMP Moorish Castle.
