= Left List (Austria) =

Left List Linke Liste
- Leader: Leo Gabriel
- Founded: 2004; 22 years ago
- Dissolved: 2004; 22 years ago
- Ideology: Anti-globalization, Socialism, Left-wing nationalism
- Political position: Left-wing to Far-left

Left List was an Austrian alliance led by a social anthropologist named Leo Gabriel, formed in 2004 for the European Parliament elections. They disbanded in 2004, since it was only a temporary electoral alliance to pool leftist votes. Leo Gabriel was a public journalist and globalization critic. His deep involvement in the World Social Forum played a key role in why the coalition was moving towards the anti-globalization movement and the anti-privatization rhetoric.

== History ==
Left List was a coalition originally created by Communist Party of Austria (KPÖ), consisting of left-wing activists. The alliance included the Socialist Left Party (SLP) and Turkish-Austrian migrant labor groups.

== Political Positions ==
Left List campaigned heavily against the privatization of Austrian state-owned enterprises, and also campaigned for the expansion of Austrian social welfare systems and safety nets. Left List also tried to eliminate university tuition to remove barriers for international students who want to pursue education in Austria.

== Electoral Performance ==
Election Year	Total Votes	% of Vote	Seats won
2004 (European)	19,045	0.77%	0/18

Stronger results were located in major urban centers and towns such as Vienna. Leo Gabriel was a lead ballot candidate (Spitzenkandidat) in the electoral ballot, using this momentum to spread awareness across multiple platforms. To secure delegation, Left List needed to attain at least 4% of votes. However, they were only able to achieve 0.77% of votes. This highlights the institutional barriers for coalition platforms in Austria.
