= 2014 European Parliament election in Gibraltar =

← 2009	22 May 2014	2019 →

Contributes towards 6 seats to the European Parliament
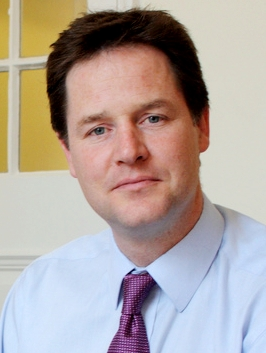

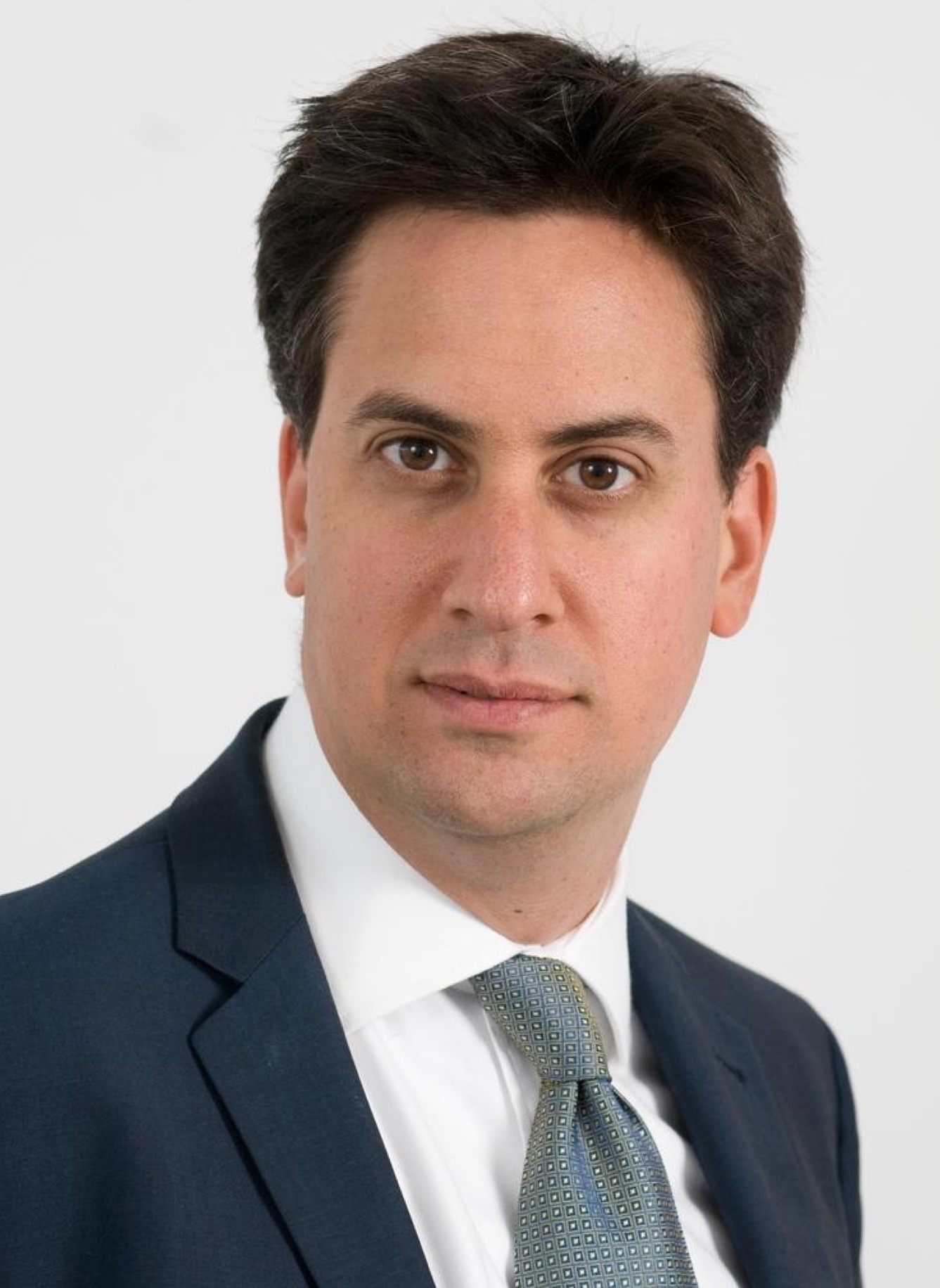
	First party	Second party	Third party
Leader	Nick Clegg	David Cameron	Ed Miliband
Party	Liberal Democrats	Conservative	Labour
Alliance	Liberal	Social Democrats	Socialist Labour
Leader since	18 December 2007	6 December 2005	25 September 2010
Last election	18.18%	53.30%	19.02%
Popular vote	4,822	1,236	659
Percentage	67.16%	17.21%	9.18%
Swing	▲48.98pp	▼36.09pp	▼9.84pp

European Parliament elections were held in the British Overseas Territory of Gibraltar (which formed part of the European Parliament constituency combined region of South West England) on 22 May 2014, with the results announced on 25 May 2014. On the previous two occasions Gibraltar has participated in European elections, the Conservative Party had topped the poll. The Liberal Democrats won the popular vote in the territory for the first time. They opposed British withdrawal from the European Union and were the only party to include a Gibraltar resident on their list of candidates, Lyana Armstrong-Emery of the Liberal Party of Gibraltar.

The result was notable as one of only four counting areas in which the Liberal Democrats topped the poll, the others being South Lakeland in Cumbria and Orkney and Shetland in Scotland. Despite the result in Gibraltar, the Liberal Democrat vote fell across the South West region (and the whole of the UK), and the sitting Liberal Democrat MEP, Graham Watson, described as a "stalwart" and "advocate" of Gibraltar, lost his seat.

== Results ==
Party	Gibraltar		South West England		Seats
Party	Votes	%	Votes	%	Seats
Liberal Democrats	4,822	67.16	160,376	10.70	0
Conservative Party	1,236	17.21	433,151	28.89	2
Labour Party	659	9.18	206,124	13.75	1
UKIP	290	4.04	484,184	32.29	2
Green Party	84	1.17	166,447	11.10	1
British National Party	42	0.58	10,910	0.73	0
English Democrats	24	0.33	15,081	1.01	0
Independence from Europe	23	0.32	23,169	1.55	0
Total	7,180	100.00	1,499,442	100.00	6
Valid votes	7,180	98.19	1,499,442	99.70	
Invalid/blank votes	132	1.81	4,483	0.30	
Total votes	7,312	100.00	1,503,925	100.00	
Registered voters/turnout	22,265	32.84			
Source: Parliament, Poole Borough Council

== See also ==
- 2014 European Parliament election in the United Kingdom
