= 2019 European Parliament election in Gibraltar =

← 2014	23 May 2019

Contributes towards 6 seats to the European Parliament
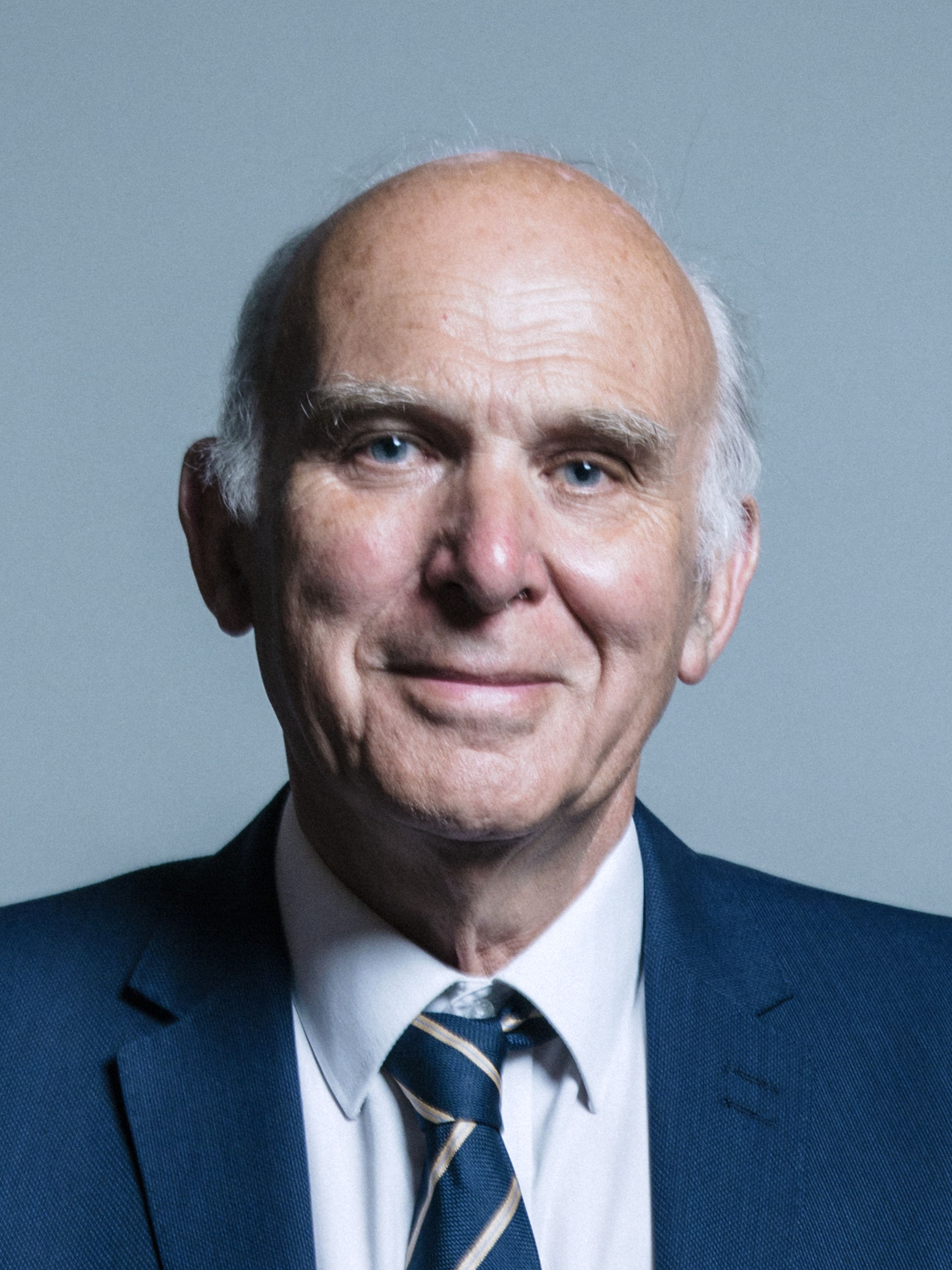

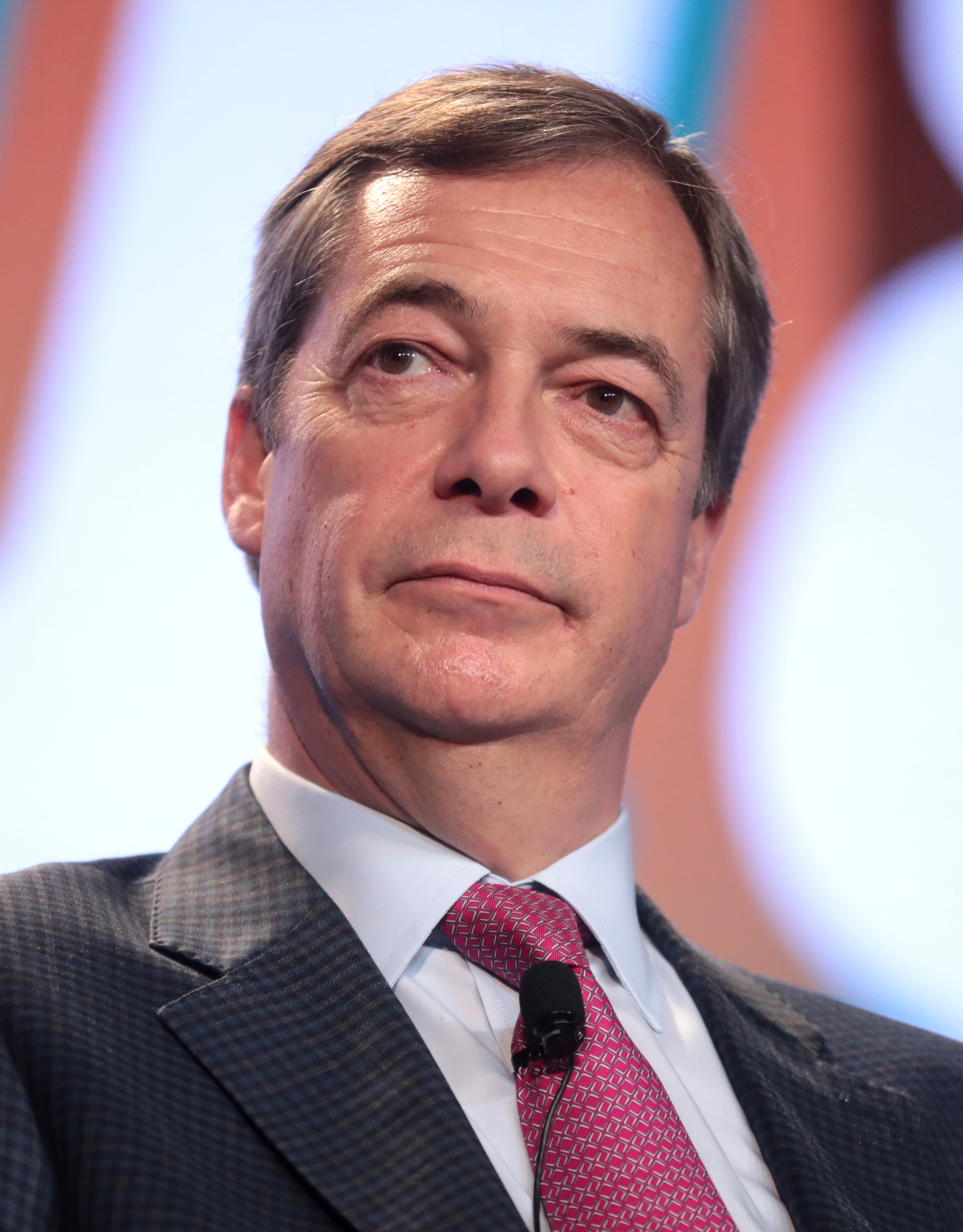

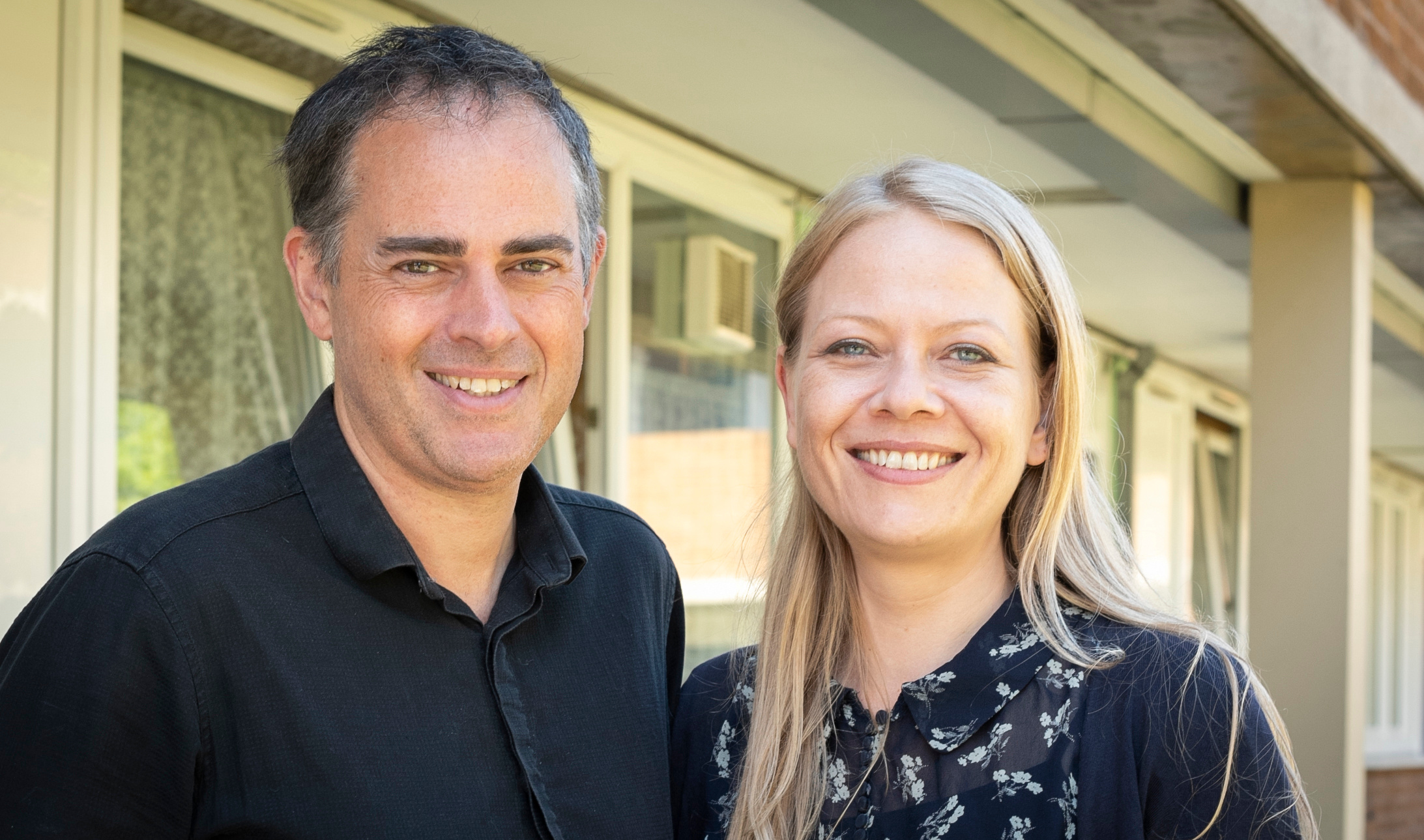
	First party	Second party	Third party
Leader	Vince Cable	Nigel Farage	Jonathan Bartley and Siân Berry
Party	Liberal Democrats	Brexit Party	Green
Alliance	Liberal
Leader since	20 July 2017	22 March 2019	4 September 2018
Last election	67.16%	–	1.17%
Popular vote	7,220	746	467
Percentage	77.38%	7.99%	5.00%
Swing	▲10.22pp	New	▲3.83pp

European Parliament elections were held in the British Overseas Territory of Gibraltar (which formed part of the European Parliament constituency of South West England) on 23 May 2019. They were held as part of the European Union-wide elections after the date of United Kingdom withdrawal was delayed by the UK government. This was Gibraltar's final participation in a European Parliament election before the withdrawal took place on 31 January 2020.

== Background ==
Gibraltar's European Union Withdrawal Act was passed in March 2019 with the support of the governing GSLP–Liberal coalition and an independent MP. The opposition Gibraltar Social Democrats originally did not intend to support the bill but later voted for it, but against parts of the legislation.

The withdrawal agreement is supported by the governing GSLP-Liberal coalition, but opposed by the opposition Gibraltar Social Democrats.

According to the Gibraltar newspaper Panorama, there had been a rise in Euroscepticism in Gibraltar since Spain was given a veto by the EU over Gibraltar's participation in the withdrawal agreement.

== Campaign ==
Candidates from the Brexit Party, Liberal Democrats, English Democrats and UKIP visited Gibraltar to campaign in the elections. The Liberal Democrat lead candidate for the constituency accepted that there was "anger and frustration" with regard to the EU's actions towards Gibraltar after the referendum result, but stated that she felt the party's anti-Brexit message was being received well.

Brexit Party candidate, James Glancy expressed concerns over the ramifications for Gibraltar of European federalisation, the Common Security and Defence Policy and influence of Spanish politicians in the EU in the event that Brexit would not happen.

== Result ==
The result was a win for the Liberal Democrats, reflecting "clearly pro-EU and pro Remain" sentiment and with the Brexit Party taking second place, which "reflects not just frustration with the stagnated Brexit process, but also anger at the way the EU has backed Spain during the withdrawal negotiations", according to the Gibraltar Chronicle.

Party	Votes	%	+/–
Liberal Democrats	7,220	77.38	+10.22
Brexit Party	746	7.99	New
Green Party	467	5.00	+3.83
Labour Party	411	4.40	–4.78
Conservative Party	256	2.74	–14.47
UKIP	84	0.90	–3.14
Change UK	77	0.83	New
English Democrats	59	0.63	+0.30
Independents	11	0.12	New
Total	9,331	100.00	–
Valid votes	9,331	98.83	
Invalid/blank votes	110	1.17	
Total votes	9,441	100.00	
Registered voters/turnout	23,726	39.79	
Source: Parliament

== See also ==
- 2019 European Parliament election in the United Kingdom
