= Reform Party (Gibraltar) =

- Leader: Lyana Armstrong-Emery
- Founded: 21 March 2000; 25 years ago
- Dissolved: 2005; 20 years ago
- Ideology: Green politics Eco-socialism
- Political position: Left-wing
- European affiliation: Greens–European Free Alliance
- UK affiliation: Green Party of England and Wales
- Colours: Green

The Gibraltar Reform Party was a political party in Gibraltar. It was a left-leaning party which described itself as green and for social justice.

Originally formed as the Independent Liberal Forum on 21 March 2000, the name was subsequently changed to the later one. The last party leader was Lyana Armstrong-Emery.

The party's broad aim was a decentralisation of power. On the constitutional status of Gibraltar, the party supported a new status, calling for Gibraltar's establishment as a devolved autonomous territory, integrated within a decentralised federal Britain. The party also called for the creation of a local Parliament for Gibraltar, a member of parliament (MP) to sit in the British House of Commons in Westminster, and a Member of the European Parliament (MEP) to represent Gibraltar in the European Parliament.

The Reform Party forged links with both the Green Party of England and Wales and Mebyon Kernow. Lyana Armstrong-Emery was voted by the party to take the position on the joint list agreed with the Green Party for the European Elections.

The party ceased operations in 2005 owing to a failure to garner wide public support.

== Election results ==
=== Parliament of Gibraltar ===
Election year	# of overall votes^	% of overall vote^	# of overall seats won^	±^
2003	578	1.0	0 / 15	New

=== European Parliament ===
Gibraltar is part of the South West England constituency in the European parliament and its major parties form joint ticket alliances with the major UK parties. In 2004, the only EU election that it participated in before its dissolution, Reform had been in an alliance with the Green Party.

Party	Year	Votes (Gib.)	Votes (SW Eng)	% (Gib.)	% (SW Eng)	Change (SW Eng)	Seats	Change
Green	2004	1,058	103,821	8.70	7.2	-1.1	0 / 7	Steady
