= Brexit opinion polls =

Brexit opinion polls may refer to:

- Opinion polling on the United Kingdom's membership of the European Union (2016–2020)
- Opinion polling for the United Kingdom European Union membership referendum
- Potential re-accession of the United Kingdom to the European Union § Opinion polling
