= Potential re-accession of the United Kingdom to the European Union =

The United Kingdom in orange; the European Union (27 member states) in blue

Following a 2016 referendum, the United Kingdom withdrew from the European Union at the end of January 2020. Since leaving the EU, numerous polling organisations have conducted surveys to gauge public opinion on rejoining the organisation. The trend of the poll data shows that, over time, support for Brexit has waned, while public opinion in the UK has gradually moved in favour of rejoining the EU (totally or partially, such as joining the European single market).

== History ==
A referendum on the United Kingdom's membership of the European Union took place in 2016, following the European Union Referendum Act being approved by parliament the previous year. Most political parties, including the Labour Party and the Liberal Democrats, supported remaining in the European Union while the governing Conservative Party remained neutral, with the prime minister, David Cameron, supporting the UK remaining in the European Union. A majority of those who voted supported the UK leaving the European Union, with 51.9% voting in favour of leaving and 48.1% in favour of remaining. Cameron resigned, and was succeeded by Theresa May, and later Boris Johnson, both of whom negotiated the terms of the UK's departure. The UK's departure from the European Union led to two early general elections in 2017 and 2019, and dominated British politics until 31 January 2020, when the country's membership of the European Union ended.

In September 2023, thousands of people participated in a march in London campaigning for the United Kingdom to rejoin the EU. Also in September 2023, France and Germany proposed a restructuring of the membership of the EU to allow the UK to rejoin as an associate member, rather than a full member. Associate membership of the European Union would include membership of the European single market but not the EU customs union, in exchange for participation in the European Court of Justice and making contributions to the EU budget. The president of the European Commission, Ursula von der Leyen, expressed her support for the UK eventually rejoining the EU. In September 2023 Keir Starmer, former leader of the Labour Party and former prime minister, ruled out the possibility of the UK rejoining the EU under a Starmer-led Labour government. The current prime minister, Andy Burnham, while campaigning for the 2026 Makerfield by-election and the 2026 Labour leadership election stated in an interview to ITV, that while "in the long term there is a case for that", he wants to focus on domestic issues first. He went further in September 2026 saying that rejoining the EU is an option for the UK. He did not rule out including it in the Labour Party's next general election manifesto.

== Process ==
Countries that could join the European Union: Current members Candidate countries Applicant / potential candidate countries Membership possible Countries located (at least partially) in Europe Membership rejected

Potential enlargement of the European Union is governed by Article 49 of the Maastricht Treaty. If the UK applied to rejoin the EU, it would need to apply and have its application terms supported unanimously by the EU member states. In January 2020, the political scientist Anthony Salamone wrote that member state support would seek "significant, stable and long-lasting majority public opinion in favour of rejoining", suggesting sustained 60% support would be a plausible minimum. New negotiated terms may also require the UK's participation in the Eurozone and Schengen Area, as well as offering fewer concessions than the UK previously received as a member. Any concessions sought when joining would need unanimous support from member states and a majority in the European Parliament.

== Political positions ==
Some UK political parties have policy proposals for the United Kingdom, or its member countries, to rejoin the European Union in the future, while others have ruled out supporting it. Here is a table showing the parties of the UK and their opinion on rejoining the EU. The Prime Minister of the UK, Andy Burnham, has hinted that the UK might rejoin the EU, but his party, Labour, has not fully backed the proposition. Reform Leader Nigel Farage and Conservative Party leader Kemi Badenoch want Britain to stay out of the EU.

Political party	Position
Conservative Party	Stay out
Green Party of England and Wales	Rejoin
Labour Party	TBD
Liberal Democrats	Rejoin the Customs Union and single market (Note: The party also supports rejoining the EU as a "long-term goal", but only actively advocates for rejoining the Customs Union and single market as of 2026)
Plaid Cymru	Have Wales become an independent country and join the EU (Note: However, Plaid Cymru have ruled out a referendum on Welsh independence before 2030. The party wishes for the UK to rejoin the single market and customs union immediately.)
Reform UK	Stay out
Scottish Greens	Have Scotland become an independent country and join the EU
Scottish National Party (SNP)	Have Scotland become an independent country and join the EU

An All-Party Parliamentary Group on Europe was set up in October 2024, with the aim of promoting closer ties with the EU. Its secretariat services are provided by the European Movement UK.

== Opinion polling ==
=== Graphical summary ===
The chart below shows the results of opinion polls on whether the United Kingdom should rejoin the European Union or stay out of it conducted since it left in January 2020. The trend lines are local regressions (LOESS), with the blue line showing support for rejoining the EU, the red line showing support for staying out and the grey one showing support for neither of these two options. Support for rejoining the EU overtook support for staying out in the summer of 2021 and the gap has continued to widen since. Polling in 2026 suggests that, on average, more than half the population support rejoining and about a third support staying out, with the rest saying "neither" or "don't know".

Scatter plot of opinion poll results on the subject of whether the United Kingdom should rejoin the European Union, with LOESS regressions.

=== National polls ===
Polling of British voters on whether the United Kingdom should rejoin the European Union. Polling includes only those that explicitly ask how the responder would vote in a hypothetical referendum on the United Kingdom rejoining the European Union, rather than repeating the remain/leave question of the 2016 referendum.

==== 2026 ====
Dates conducted	Pollster	Client	Sample size	Rejoin	Stay out	Neither	Lead
29 Oct – 2 Nov 2026	Lord Ashcroft	N/A	5,253	53%	29%	18%	24%
15–23 Oct 2026	Ipsos	N/A	1,109	56%	30%	14%	26%
4–5 Oct 2026	YouGov	The Times	2,312	52%	27%	22%	25%
24–25 Sep 2026	YouGov	N/A	2,062	59%	32%	10%	27%
20–21 Jul 2026	YouGov	N/A	2,081	53%	29%	18%	24%
2–3 Jun 2026	YouGov	The Times	2,114	55%	34%	10%	21%
19 May – 1 Jun 2026	Survation	N/A	10,024	55%	32%	15%	23%
21–26 May 2026	Lord Ashcroft	N/A	5,263	53%	30%	17%	23%
20–22 May 2026	YouGov	N/A	4,067	56%	35%	9%	21%
14–20 May 2026	Ipsos	N/A	1,137	52%	33%	15%	19%
29–30 Apr 2026	BMG Research	The i	1,521	48%	35%	15%	13%
16–17 Apr 2026	YouGov	N/A	2,104	55%	33%	12%	22%
25–26 Mar 2026	BMG Research	The i	1,507	48%	34%	18%	14%
12–13 Mar 2026	YouGov	N/A	2,102	53%	28%	19%	25%
3–4 Mar 2026	BMG Research	The i	1,503	45%	37%	18%	8%
22–23 Feb 2026	YouGov	N/A	2,080	55%	34%	11%	21%
3–4 Feb 2026	YouGov	N/A	2,012	52%	29%	19%	23%
28–29 Jan 2026	BMG Research	The i	1,513	44%	35%	21%	9%
22–23 Jan 2026	YouGov	N/A	2,043	54%	34%	12%	20%
15–16 Jan 2026	YouGov	N/A	2,046	49%	31%	20%	18%

==== 2025 ====
Dates conducted	Pollster	Client	Sample size	Rejoin	Stay out	Neither	Lead
16–18 Dec 2025	Deltapoll	The Mirror	1,997	47%	34%	19%	13%
11–12 Dec 2025	YouGov	N/A	2,063	50%	31%	19%	19%
26–27 Nov 2025	BMG Research	The i	1,548	43%	39%	17%	4%
17–18 Nov 2025	YouGov	N/A	2,138	50%	30%	20%	20%
15–16 Oct 2025	YouGov	Eurotrack	2,167	50%	31%	20%	19%
5–10 Oct 2025	YouGov	Best for Britain	4,368	53%	32%	14%	21%
16–17 Sep 2025	YouGov	Eurotrack	2,245	49%	30%	20%	19%
26–28 Aug 2025	BMG Research	The i	1,504	43%	38%	19%	5%
25–26 Aug 2025	YouGov	Eurotrack	2,192	49%	30%	20%	19%
29–31 Jul 2025	BMG Research	The i	1,528	43%	37%	21%	6%
15–16 Jul 2025	YouGov	Eurotrack	2,006	51%	30%	18%	21%
8–9 Jul 2025	YouGov	N/A	2,005	54%	32%	13%	22%
24–25 Jun 2025	BMG Research	The i	1,617	42%	38%	19%	4%
18–19 Jun 2025	YouGov	Eurotrack	2,029	55%	34%	11%	21%
16–17 Jun 2025	YouGov	N/A	2,239	56%	34%	10%	22%
28–29 May 2025	BMG Research	The i	1,510	44%	38%	17%	6%
18–19 May 2025	YouGov	N/A	2,212	53%	35%	12%	18%
12–13 May 2025	YouGov	Eurotrack	2,227	49%	32%	19%	17%
6–8 May 2025	BMG Research	The i	1,525	41%	40%	18%	1%
9–10 Apr 2025	YouGov	Eurotrack	2,001	49%	32%	19%	17%
26–27 Mar 2025	BMG Research	The i	1,544	45%	38%	17%	7%
16–17 Mar 2025	YouGov	N/A	2,081	53%	36%	11%	17%
14–17 Mar 2025	Deltapoll	N/A	1,974	49%	35%	15%	14%
13–14 Mar 2025	YouGov	Eurotrack	2,155	49%	31%	21%	18%
25–26 Feb 2025	BMG Research	The i	1,586	45%	40%	15%	5%
5–6 Feb 2025	YouGov	Eurotrack	2,117	48%	32%	19%	16%
28–29 Jan 2025	BMG Research	The i	1,514	45%	37%	18%	8%
20–21 Jan 2025	YouGov	N/A	2,225	51%	31%	19%	20%
12–13 Jan 2025	YouGov	Eurotrack	2,283	48%	33%	20%	15%
30 Dec – 3 Jan 2025	Deltapoll	Mail on Sunday	1,532	48%	36%	16%	12%

==== 2024 ====
Dates conducted	Pollster	Client	Sample size	Rejoin	Stay out	Neither	Lead
19–23 Dec 2024	Deltapoll	The Mirror	1,552	45%	38%	16%	7%
6–8 Dec 2024	YouGov	Eurotrack	2,119	45%	32%	23%	13%
26–27 Nov 2024	BMG Research	The i	1,531	44%	40%	17%	4%
14–18 Nov 2024	Deltapoll	N/A	1,749	48%	35%	17%	13%
30–31 Oct 2024	BMG Research	The i	1,511	44%	38%	19%	6%
18–20 Oct 2024	YouGov	Eurotrack	2,098	47%	31%	22%	16%
4–7 Oct 2024	Deltapoll	N/A	2,108	47%	38%	15%	9%
2–3 Oct 2024	BMG Research	The i	1,562	43%	39%	17%	4%
10–11 Sep 2024	YouGov	Eurotrack	2,212	48%	30%	22%	18%
29 Aug 2024	BMG Research	The i	1,560	46%	37%	17%	9%
19 Aug 2024	Redfield & Wilton Strategies	UK in a Changing Europe	2,000	51%	40%	8%	11%
12–13 Aug 2024	YouGov	Eurotrack	2,189	46%	33%	20%	13%
7–8 Aug 2024	Omnisis	N/A	1,278	43%	32%	25%	11%
5–7 Aug 2024	BMG Research	The i	1,523	44%	37%	19%	7%
25–26 Jul 2024	Omnisis	N/A	2,012	39%	33%	28%	6%
23–24 Jul 2024	YouGov	N/A	2,032	48%	33%	19%	15%
18–19 Jul 2024	YouGov	Eurotrack	2,074	49%	32%	18%	17%
11–12 Jul 2024	Omnisis	N/A	2,005	40%	35%	25%	5%
2–3 Jul 2024	Omnisis	N/A	1,325	47%	35%	18%	12%
29 Jun – 3 Jul 2024	Deltapoll	N/A	1,737	49%	38%	14%	11%
30 Jun – 2 Jul 2024	BMG Research	The i	1,854	46%	37%	18%	9%
27–29 Jun 2024	Deltapoll	The Mail on Sunday	1,645	47%	39%	13%	8%
27–28 Jun 2024	Omnisis	N/A	1,210	47%	34%	19%	13%
24–26 Jun 2024	Deltapoll	The National	2,077	46%	37%	16%	9%
24–26 Jun 2024	BMG Research	The i	1,522	47%	38%	14%	9%
21–24 Jun 2024	Deltapoll	N/A	1,568	50%	35%	16%	15%
20–21 Jun 2024	Omnisis	N/A	1,270	50%	31%	18%	19%
18–19 Jun 2024	BMG Research	The i	1,627	47%	38%	15%	9%
14–17 Jun 2024	Deltapoll	N/A	1,383	45%	41%	13%	4%
13–14 Jun 2024	YouGov	Eurotrack	2,292	48%	33%	19%	15%
12–13 Jun 2024	Redfield & Wilton Strategies	UK in a Changing Europe	2,000	55%	35%	10%	20%
12–13 Jun 2024	Omnisis	N/A	1,297	49%	33%	18%	16%
11–12 Jun 2024	BMG Research	The i	1,546	47%	39%	15%	8%
6–8 Jun 2024	Deltapoll	Mail on Sunday	2,010	50%	35%	15%	15%
6–7 Jun 2024	Omnisis	N/A	1,198	50%	31%	19%	19%
4–5 Jun 2024	BMG Research	The i	1,534	45%	38%	17%	7%
31 May – 3 Jun 2024	Deltapoll	N/A	1,077	51%	34%	15%	17%
30 May – 3 Jun 2024	Verian	N/A	1,405	56%	28%	17%	28%
30–31 May 2024	Omnisis	N/A	1,328	47%	34%	19%	13%
28–29 May 2024	BMG Research	The i	1,500	44%	41%	15%	3%
23–25 May 2024	Deltapoll	Mail on Sunday	1,517	51%	35%	13%	16%
23–24 May 2024	Omnisis	N/A	1,242	48%	31%	21%	17%
17–20 May 2024	Deltapoll	N/A	1,968	49%	36%	16%	13%
16–17 May 2024	Omnisis	N/A	1,064	49%	31%	20%	18%
10–13 May 2024	Deltapoll	N/A	1,031	45%	36%	19%	9%
9–10 May 2024	Omnisis	N/A	1,183	48%	32%	20%	16%
3–7 May 2024	Deltapoll	N/A	1,993	48%	38%	15%	10%
2–5 May 2024	JL Partners	The Rest is Politics	2,001	47%	36%	16%	11%
2–3 May 2024	Omnisis	N/A	1,177	46%	33%	21%	13%
26–29 Apr 2024	Deltapoll	N/A	1,577	47%	36%	17%	11%
25–26 Apr 2024	Omnisis	N/A	1,265	48%	31%	21%	17%
22–23 Apr 2024	BMG Research	The i	1,500	47%	39%	14%	8%
19–22 Apr 2024	Deltapoll	N/A	1,525	49%	35%	16%	14%
18–19 Apr 2024	Omnisis	N/A	1,266	48%	33%	19%	15%
17–18 Apr 2024	YouGov	Eurotrack	2,147	49%	32%	20%	17%
16–17 Apr 2024	Redfield & Wilton Strategies	UK in a Changing Europe	2,000	55%	38%	8%	17%
12–15 Apr 2024	Deltapoll	N/A	1,944	51%	35%	14%	16%
11–12 Apr 2024	Omnisis	N/A	1,271	50%	31%	19%	19%
4–7 Apr 2024	JL Partners	The Rest is Politics	2,011	48%	36%	15%	12%
4–5 Apr 2024	Omnisis	N/A	1,280	49%	32%	19%	17%
2–3 Apr 2024	BMG Research	The i	1,530	46%	40%	14%	6%
27–28 Mar 2024	Omnisis	N/A	1,285	48%	32%	20%	16%
22–25 Mar 2024	Deltapoll	N/A	1,589	47%	37%	16%	10%
21–22 Mar 2024	Omnisis	N/A	1,270	48%	32%	19%	16%
15–18 Mar 2024	Deltapoll	N/A	2,072	49%	36%	16%	13%
14–15 Mar 2024	Omnisis	N/A	1,270	49%	34%	17%	15%
12–13 Mar 2024	YouGov	Eurotrack	2,047	49%	30%	21%	19%
8–11 Mar 2024	Deltapoll	N/A	1,502	47%	40%	14%	7%
7–8 Mar 2024	Omnisis	N/A	1,216	46%	34%	20%	12%
6–7 Mar 2024	BMG Research	The i	1,541	45%	41%	14%	4%
1–4 Mar 2024	Deltapoll	N/A	1,500	46%	39%	15%	7%
29 Feb – 1 Mar 2024	Omnisis	N/A	1,240	50%	33%	17%	17%
23–26 Feb 2024	Deltapoll	N/A	1,490	49%	36%	15%	13%
22–23 Feb 2024	Omnisis	N/A	1,243	50%	31%	19%	19%
16–19 Feb 2024	Deltapoll	N/A	1,519	45%	38%	16%	7%
15–16 Feb 2024	Omnisis	N/A	1,246	47%	33%	20%	14%
15–16 Feb 2024	YouGov	Eurotrack	2,186	47%	32%	21%	15%
13–14 Feb 2024	Redfield & Wilton Strategies	UK in a Changing Europe	2,000	55%	36%	8%	19%
9–12 Feb 2024	Deltapoll	N/A	1,977	46%	39%	15%	7%
8–9 Feb 2024	Omnisis	N/A	1,171	50%	31%	19%	19%
2–5 Feb 2024	Deltapoll	N/A	2,004	47%	37%	15%	10%
1–2 Feb 2024	Omnisis	N/A	1,283	52%	31%	18%	21%
30–31 Jan 2024	BMG Research	The i	1,505	46%	41%	13%	5%
26–29 Jan 2024	Deltapoll	N/A	2,064	47%	38%	14%	9%
25–26 Jan 2024	Omnisis	N/A	1,264	50%	33%	18%	17%
19–22 Jan 2024	Deltapoll	N/A	2,176	47%	37%	16%	10%
18–19 Jan 2024	Omnisis	N/A	1,163	50%	31%	19%	19%
12–15 Jan 2024	Deltapoll	N/A	2,136	46%	38%	15%	8%
11–12 Jan 2024	Omnisis	N/A	1,161	50%	33%	17%	17%
11–12 Jan 2024	YouGov	Eurotrack	2,058	47%	31%	22%	16%
4–5 Jan 2024	Omnisis	N/A	1,226	48%	32%	20%	16%
2–3 Jan 2024	YouGov	N/A	2,016	51%	36%	13%	15%

==== 2023 ====
Dates conducted	Pollster	Client	Sample size	Rejoin	Stay out	Neither	Lead
29–31 Dec 2023	YouGov	Eurotrack	2,194	46%	31%	23%	15%
28–30 Dec 2023	Omnisis	N/A	1,181	49%	33%	18%	16%
22–29 Dec 2023	Deltapoll	Daily Mirror	1,642	47%	39%	14%	8%
20–22 Dec 2023	Omnisis	N/A	1,177	48%	34%	18%	14%
14–15 Dec 2023	Omnisis	N/A	1,065	46%	34%	20%	12%
10–11 Dec 2023	Redfield & Wilton Strategies	UK in a Changing Europe	2,000	52%	40%	8%	12%
8–11 Dec 2023	Deltapoll	N/A	1,005	44%	41%	15%	3%
7–8 Dec 2023	Omnisis	N/A	1,201	46%	34%	20%	12%
1–4 Dec 2023	Deltapoll	N/A	1,000	45%	40%	15%	5%
30 Nov – 1 Dec 2023	Omnisis	N/A	1,123	46%	31%	23%	15%
28–30 Nov 2023	BMG Research	The i	1,502	42%	43%	15%	1%
24–27 Nov 2023	Deltapoll	N/A	1,996	48%	36%	15%	12%
23–24 Nov 2023	We Think	N/A	1,119	50%	33%	17%	17%
16–20 Nov 2023	Deltapoll	N/A	1,565	46%	37%	17%	9%
16–17 Nov 2023	Omnisis	N/A	1,150	47%	34%	19%	13%
15–16 Nov 2023	YouGov	Eurotrack	2,007	46%	32%	22%	14%
10–13 Nov 2023	Deltapoll	N/A	1,840	48%	37%	15%	11%
9–10 Nov 2023	Omnisis	N/A	1,147	49%	33%	18%	16%
3–6 Nov 2023	Deltapoll	N/A	1,021	48%	38%	14%	10%
2–3 Nov 2023	Omnisis	N/A	1,155	49%	32%	19%	17%
27–30 Oct 2023	Deltapoll	N/A	1,546	46%	36%	18%	10%
26–27 Oct 2023	Omnisis	N/A	1,189	45%	35%	20%	10%
21 Oct 2023	Redfield & Wilton Strategies	UK in a Changing Europe	2,000	55%	38%	8%	17%
19–20 Oct 2023	Omnisis	N/A	1,185	48%	33%	19%	15%
19–20 Oct 2023	Deltapoll	N/A	1,036	49%	39%	11%	10%
13–16 Oct 2023	Deltapoll	N/A	1,568	46%	37%	17%	9%
12–13 Oct 2023	Omnisis	N/A	1,198	52%	30%	18%	22%
11–12 Oct 2023	BMG Research	The i	1,591	44%	41%	16%	3%
11–12 Oct 2023	YouGov	Eurotrack	2,067	47%	34%	19%	13%
5–6 Oct 2023	Omnisis	N/A	1,261	46%	33%	21%	13%
5–6 Oct 2023	Deltapoll	N/A	1,517	46%	39%	14%	7%
4–5 Oct 2023	BMG Research	The i	1,502	44%	40%	16%	4%
29 Sep – 2 Oct 2023	Deltapoll	N/A	1,516	49%	38%	13%	11%
28–29 Sep 2023	Omnisis	N/A	1,285	48%	36%	17%	12%
22–25 Sep 2023	Deltapoll	N/A	1,507	48%	36%	16%	12%
21–22 Sep 2023	Omnisis	N/A	1,313	48%	31%	22%	17%
14–15 Sep 2023	Omnisis	N/A	1,268	50%	31%	18%	19%
11–15 Sep 2023	Deltapoll	N/A	2,039	49%	38%	12%	11%
7–8 Sep 2023	Omnisis	N/A	1,268	47%	32%	20%	15%
24–25 Aug 2023	Deltapoll	N/A	1,061	48%	35%	17%	13%
22–23 Aug 2023	BMG Research	The i	1,562	47%	39%	14%	8%
22–23 Aug 2023	Omnisis	N/A	1,356	48%	31%	21%	17%
19–20 Aug 2023	Redfield & Wilton Strategies	UK in a Changing Europe	2,000	57%	35%	8%	22%
17–21 Aug 2023	Deltapoll	N/A	1,520	46%	34%	21%	12%
17–18 Aug 2023	Omnisis	N/A	1,315	48%	31%	21%	17%
10–11 Aug 2023	Omnisis	N/A	1,345	50%	30%	20%	20%
10–11 Aug 2023	YouGov	Eurotrack	2,066	49%	32%	18%	17%
9–11 Aug 2023	Deltapoll	Mail on Sunday	1,504	48%	34%	17%	14%
8–9 Aug 2023	YouGov	N/A	2,101	50%	30%	20%	20%
4–7 Aug 2023	Deltapoll	N/A	1,023	50%	35%	15%	15%
3–4 Aug 2023	Omnisis	N/A	1,420	48%	31%	20%	17%
27–28 Jul 2023	Omnisis	N/A	1,339	50%	31%	19%	19%
20–21 Jul 2023	Omnisis	N/A	1,380	48%	32%	20%	16%
19–20 Jul 2023	YouGov	Eurotrack	2,069	49%	33%	18%	16%
14–17 Jul 2023	Deltapoll	N/A	1,000	48%	38%	15%	10%
13–14 Jul 2023	YouGov	N/A	2,151	51%	31%	18%	20%
13–14 Jul 2023	Omnisis	N/A	1,312	48%	34%	18%	14%
6–7 Jul 2023	Omnisis	N/A	1,312	49%	32%	19%	17%
29–30 Jun 2023	Omnisis	N/A	1,351	47%	32%	22%	15%
27–29 Jun 2023	BMG Research	The i	1,500	45%	40%	15%	5%
25–26 Jun 2023	BMG Research	The i	1,524	46%	39%	15%	7%
22–23 Jun 2023	Omnisis	N/A	1,336	50%	31%	20%	19%
17–19 Jun 2023	YouGov	Eurotrack	1,961	45%	32%	23%	13%
16–19 Jun 2023	Deltapoll	N/A	1,554	47%	37%	15%	10%
15–16 Jun 2023	Omnisis	N/A	1,306	47%	31%	21%	16%
8–9 Jun 2023	Omnisis	N/A	1,296	47%	32%	20%	15%
1–2 Jun 2023	Omnisis	N/A	1,351	49%	31%	20%	18%
30–31 May 2023	BMG Research	The i	1,529	49%	36%	14%	13%
26–27 May 2023	Omnisis	N/A	1,361	47%	33%	20%	14%
19–22 May 2023	Deltapoll	N/A	1,575	48%	38%	14%	10%
17–18 May 2023	Omnisis	N/A	1,361	47%	33%	20%	14%
15–16 May 2023	YouGov	Eurotrack	2,037	46%	33%	22%	13%
12–15 May 2023	Deltapoll	N/A	1,511	46%	39%	15%	7%
12–13 May 2023	Omnisis	N/A	1,355	47%	33%	9%	14%
5–9 May 2023	Deltapoll	N/A	1,550	48%	38%	14%	10%
4–5 May 2023	Omnisis	N/A	1,210	50%	30%	20%	20%
3–4 May 2023	BMG Research	The i	1,534	45%	38%	16%	7%
28 Apr – 2 May 2023	Deltapoll	N/A	1,561	46%	37%	18%	9%
26–27 Apr 2023	Omnisis	N/A	1,193	48%	31%	20%	17%
24–26 Apr 2023	Deltapoll	N/A	1,576	48%	37%	16%	11%
19–20 Apr 2023	Omnisis	N/A	1,318	49%	31%	21%	18%
18 Apr 2023	Redfield & Wilton Strategies	UK in a Changing Europe	2,000	56%	37%	7%	19%
13–17 Apr 2023	Deltapoll	N/A	1,567	48%	38%	14%	10%
12–13 Apr 2023	Omnisis	N/A	1,204	46%	35%	19%	11%
11–12 Apr 2023	YouGov	Eurotrack	1,985	47%	33%	20%	14%
5–6 Apr 2023	Omnisis	N/A	1,204	46%	34%	20%	12%
31 Mar – 3 Apr 2023	Deltapoll	N/A	1,587	48%	38%	14%	10%
28–29 Mar 2023	Omnisis	N/A	1,344	49%	32%	19%	17%
24–27 Mar 2023	Deltapoll	N/A	1,344	42%	41%	17%	1%
22–23 Mar 2023	Omnisis	N/A	1,382	48%	33%	19%	15%
17–20 Mar 2023	Deltapoll	N/A	1,054	47%	39%	14%	8%
15–16 Mar 2023	Omnisis	N/A	1,126	48%	32%	20%	16%
15–16 Mar 2023	BMG Research	The i	1,546	45%	40%	14%	5%
10–13 Mar 2023	Deltapoll	N/A	1,561	48%	38%	13%	10%
9–10 Mar 2023	YouGov	Eurotrack	2,004	45%	33%	23%	12%
8–9 Mar 2023	Omnisis	N/A	1,323	52%	30%	18%	22%
2–6 Mar 2023	Deltapoll	N/A	1,063	51%	37%	12%	14%
1–2 Mar 2023	Omnisis	N/A	1,284	47%	32%	22%	15%
24–27 Feb 2023	Deltapoll	N/A	1,060	48%	38%	13%	10%
22–23 Feb 2023	Omnisis	N/A	1,248	43%	35%	21%	8%
21–23 Feb 2023	BMG Research	The i	1,500	45%	41%	14%	4%
20 Feb 2023	Redfield & Wilton Strategies	UK in a Changing Europe	2,000	56%	36%	8%	20%
17–20 Feb 2023	Deltapoll	N/A	1,079	50%	38%	12%	12%
15–16 Feb 2023	Omnisis	N/A	1,204	49%	33%	18%	16%
11–15 Feb 2023	YouGov	Eurotrack	2,062	48%	32%	20%	16%
9–10 Feb 2023	Omnisis	N/A	1,234	45%	32%	23%	13%
2–3 Feb 2023	Omnisis	N/A	1,255	49%	30%	21%	19%
26–27 Jan 2023	Omnisis	N/A	1,257	49%	29%	22%	20%
24–26 Jan 2023	BMG Research	The i	1,502	43%	41%	17%	2%
19–20 Jan 2023	Omnisis	N/A	1,217	47%	31%	22%	16%
11–12 Jan 2023	Omnisis	N/A	1,247	44%	31%	25%	13%
5–6 Jan 2023	Omnisis	N/A	1,285	49%	30%	21%	19%

==== 2022 ====
Dates conducted	Pollster	Client	Sample size	Rejoin	Stay out	Neither	Lead
21–22 Dec 2022	Omnisis	N/A	1,243	45%	32%	23%	13%
15–16 Dec 2022	Omnisis	N/A	1,216	45%	32%	23%	13%
14–15 Dec 2022	YouGov	The Times	1,690	47%	34%	18%	13%
8–9 Dec 2022	Omnisis	N/A	1,294	44%	34%	22%	10%
7–8 Dec 2022	Redfield & Wilton Strategies	UK in a Changing Europe	2,000	52%	41%	7%	11%
1–2 Dec 2022	Omnisis	N/A	1,172	45%	33%	22%	12%
29 Nov – 1 Dec 2022	BMG Research	The i	1,571	45%	41%	14%	4%
23–24 Nov 2022	Omnisis	N/A	1,172	49%	37%	14%	12%
17–18 Nov 2022	Omnisis	N/A	1,159	53%	34%	14%	19%
14–15 Nov 2022	YouGov	Eurotrack	1,689	48%	33%	18%	15%
10–11 Nov 2022	Omnisis	N/A	1,181	48%	37%	16%	11%
3–4 Nov 2022	Omnisis	N/A	1,352	48%	35%	17%	13%
27–28 Oct 2022	Omnisis	N/A	1,568	51%	35%	14%	16%
24–26 Oct 2022	BMG Research	The i	1,353	44%	40%	14%	4%
21–22 Oct 2022	Omnisis	N/A	1,353	50%	32%	18%	18%
20 Oct 2022	Omnisis	N/A	1,382	49%	37%	13%	12%
19 Oct 2022	Redfield & Wilton Strategies	UK in a Changing Europe	1,500	52%	39%	8%	13%
13–14 Oct 2022	Omnisis	N/A	1,403	51%	35%	14%	16%
6–7 Oct 2022	Omnisis	N/A	1,328	47%	33%	20%	14%
29–30 Sep 2022	Omnisis	N/A	1,320	42%	36%	22%	6%
23–26 Sep 2022	Omnisis	N/A	1,307	49%	31%	19%	18%
20–21 Sep 2022	YouGov	Eurotrack	1,704	46%	36%	19%	10%
19 Aug 2022	Redfield & Wilton Strategies	UK in a Changing Europe	1,500	49%	42%	9%	7%
4–5 Aug 2022	YouGov	Eurotrack	1,669	45%	37%	19%	8%
10–11 Jul 2022	YouGov	Eurotrack	1,684	45%	38%	17%	7%
19–20 Jun 2022	Redfield & Wilton Strategies	UK in a Changing Europe	2,000	48%	43%	9%	5%
9–10 Jun 2022	YouGov	Eurotrack	1,739	45%	36%	20%	9%
16–17 May 2022	YouGov	N/A	1,669	41%	38%	21%	3%
19 Apr 2022	Redfield & Wilton Strategies	UK in a Changing Europe	2,000	45%	47%	8%	2%
13–14 Apr 2022	Deltapoll	Mail on Sunday	1,550	47%	40%	14%	7%
9–11 Apr 2022	YouGov	Eurotrack	1,915	43%	38%	19%	5%
16–17 Mar 2022	YouGov	N/A	1,761	43%	35%	22%	8%
20 Feb 2022	Redfield & Wilton Strategies	UK in a Changing Europe	2,000	41%	50%	9%	9%
10–11 Feb 2022	YouGov	Eurotrack	1,720	44%	36%	19%	8%
17–18 Jan 2022	YouGov	N/A	1,695	42%	39%	19%	3%

==== 2021 ====
Dates conducted	Pollster	Client	Sample size	Rejoin	Stay out	Neither	Lead
23 Dec 2021	Opinium	The Observer	1,904	41%	42%	17%	1%
13 Dec 2021	Kantar	N/A	1,074	36%	33%	30%	3%
10–12 Dec 2021	Savanta ComRes	The Independent	2,096	44%	43%	10%	1%
2–3 Dec 2021	YouGov	Eurotrack	1,703	45%	37%	18%	8%
22 Nov 2021	Kantar	N/A	1,119	34%	32%	34%	2%
16–17 Nov 2021	YouGov	Eurotrack	1,712	44%	39%	16%	5%
9 Nov 2021	Redfield & Wilton Strategies	UK in a Changing Europe	1,500	44%	50%	6%	6%
5–7 Nov 2021	ComRes	N/A	1,687	48%	41%	12%	7%
12–13 Oct 2021	YouGov	Eurotrack	1,659	41%	37%	22%	4%
15–16 Sep 2021	YouGov	Eurotrack	1,635	41%	39%	21%	2%
12–13 Aug 2021	YouGov	Eurotrack	1,767	41%	41%	18%	Tie
20–21 Jul 2021	YouGov	Eurotrack	1,767	39%	41%	20%	2%
22–23 Jun 2021	YouGov	Eurotrack	1,711	39%	41%	20%	2%
18–20 Jun 2021	ComRes	N/A	2,191	42%	42%	16%	Tie
24–25 May 2021	YouGov	Eurotrack	1,622	39%	44%	17%	5%
22–26 Apr 2021	Kantar	N/A	1,115	31%	37%	32%	6%
21–22 Apr 2021	YouGov	Eurotrack	1,730	38%	43%	19%	5%
16–19 Mar 2021	BMG Research	The Independent	1,498	43%	49%	8%	6%
15–16 Mar 2021	YouGov	Eurotrack	1,672	40%	41%	18%	1%
18–22 Feb 2021	Kantar	N/A	1,114	33%	33%	35%	Tie
16–17 Feb 2021	YouGov	Eurotrack	1,697	39%	41%	20%	2%
21–25 Jan 2021	Kantar	N/A	1,100	34%	37%	29%	3%
19–25 Jan 2021	YouGov	The Times	3,312	42%	40%	18%	2%
18–19 Jan 2021	YouGov	Eurotrack	1,697	42%	40%	18%	2%

==== 2020 ====
Dates conducted	Pollster	Client	Sample size	Rejoin	Stay out	Neither	Lead
10–14 Dec 2020	Kantar	N/A	1,137	32%	34%	34%	2%
5–9 Nov 2020	Kantar	N/A	1,141	37%	33%	30%	4%
17–21 Sep 2020	Kantar	N/A	1,125	31%	38%	31%	7%
10–11 Aug 2020	YouGov	N/A	1,595	43%	39%	18%	4%
6–10 Aug 2020	Kantar	N/A	1,161	37%	33%	30%	4%
2–26 Jul 2020	NatCen	The UK in a Changing Europe	2,413	47%	39%	14%	8%
9–13 Jul 2020	Kantar	N/A	1,131	33%	39%	28%	6%
21–22 May 2020	YouGov	Handelsblatt	1,669	42%	41%	18%	1%
7–9 Apr 2020	BMG Research	The Independent	1,371	43%	47%	10%	4%
24–26 Mar 2020	Number Cruncher Politics	Bloomberg	1,010	38%	47%	14%	9%
3–6 Mar 2020	BMG Research	The Independent	1,337	40%	48%	12%	8%
4–7 Feb 2020	BMG Research	The Independent	1,503	42%	46%	12%	4%
4–5 Feb 2020	YouGov	Handelsblatt	1,578	42%	40%	20%	2%
31 Jan 2020	the United Kingdom leaves the European Union						

=== Specialist opinion polling ===
==== Conditioning Accession on Euro Adoption and joining the Schengen Area ====
During the United Kingdom's membership of the European Union, it did not join the border control free Schengen Area. It also did not seek to adopt the Euro and attained an opt-out as a part of the Maastricht Treaty negotiations.

In July 2025, YouGov asked: If the only basis on which the European Union was willing to allow the UK to rejoin was that it would now have to participate in all major EU policy areas that the UK previously held opt-outs for (i.e. on top of all the previous EU rules, the UK would now also have to join the Euro, and have to participate in the Schengen passport-free travel zone), would you support or oppose the UK rejoining the European Union?

The results were that 36% would be in favour of rejoining, 42% would oppose and 13% were undecided.

==== Conditioning Accession on Euro Adoption ====
WeThink, the public polling arm of Omnisis, began including a supplementary question as a part of its Brexit polling assessing how Euro adoption would influence voting intentions on a hypothetical referendum on re-joining the European Union.

Question: A condition of rejoining might be the adoption of the euro as currency. If the UK did have to adopt the euro how do you think you would vote if there was a referendum on EU membership tomorrow?
Dates conducted	Pollster	Client	Sample size	Re-Join the EU	Stay out	Neither	Lead
7–8 Aug 2024	Omnisis	N/A	1,278	34%	41%	26%	7%
25–26 Jul 2024	Omnisis	N/A	2,012	31%	41%	28%	10%
11–12 Jul 2024	Omnisis	N/A	2,005	34%	39%	27%	5%
2–3 Jul 2024	Omnisis	N/A	1,325	37%	43%	20%	6%
27–28 Jun 2024	Omnisis	N/A	1,210	39%	42%	19%	3%
20–21 Jun 2024	Omnisis	N/A	1,270	39%	40%	20%	1%
12–13 Jun 2024	Omnisis	N/A	1,297	37%	43%	20%	6%
6–7 Jun 2024	WeThink	N/A	1,198	39%	41%	20%	2%
30–31 May 2024	Omnisis	N/A	1,328	38%	43%	20%	5%
23–24 May 2024	Omnisis	N/A	1,242	38%	39%	24%	1%
16–17 May 2024	Omnisis	N/A	1,064	39%	39%	22%	Tie
9–10 May 2024	Omnisis	N/A	1,183	39%	41%	20%	2%
2–3 May 2024	Omnisis	N/A	1,177	35%	43%	21%	8%
25–26 Apr 2024	Omnisis	N/A	1,265	38%	38%	23%	Tie
18–19 Apr 2024	Omnisis	N/A	1,266	38%	42%	20%	4%
11–12 Apr 2024	Omnisis	N/A	1,271	37%	42%	20%	5%
4–5 Apr 2024	WeThink	N/A	1,280	37%	40%	23%	3%
21–22 Mar 2024	Omnisis	N/A	1,270	38%	41%	21%	3%
14–15 Mar 2024	Omnisis	N/A	1,270	35%	45%	19%	10%
7–8 Mar 2024	Omnisis	N/A	1,216	38%	40%	21%	2%
29 Feb – 1 Mar 2024	Omnisis	N/A	1,240	39%	42%	20%	3%
22–23 Feb 2024	Omnisis	N/A	1,243	39%	42%	20%	3%
15–16 Feb 2024	Omnisis	N/A	1,246	36%	41%	23%	5%
8–9 Feb 2024	Omnisis	N/A	1,171	37%	42%	21%	5%
1–2 Feb 2024	Omnisis	N/A	1,283	39%	42%	19%	3%
25–26 Jan 2024	Omnisis	N/A	1,264	39%	42%	19%	3%
18–19 Jan 2024	Omnisis	N/A	1,163	39%	40%	21%	1%

Prior to January 2024, Opinium, as published by WeThink, asked the following two questions;

Would the requirement to adopt the Euro as currency change your decision? Would the requirement to adopt the Euro as currency change your decision to rejoin the EU if you would vote to rejoin? referendum on EU membership tomorrow?

The available responses were;

I would still want the UK to rejoin the EU if adopting the Euro was a requirement

I would not want the UK to rejoin the EU if adopting the Euro was a requirement

I would only want the UK to rejoin the EU if we were able to keep Sterling as our currency

==== Young voters ====
Starting in April 2023, Savanta – commissioned by Peston, ITV's flagship political discussion programme – conducts polls of young people aged 18 to 25 on a range of issues, including their views on the UK rejoining the European Union.

Question: If there was a referendum now on whether the UK should or should not join the EU tomorrow with the question, 'Should the United Kingdom become a member of the European Union or not become a member of the European Union?', how would you vote?
Dates conducted	Pollster	Client	Sample size	Join the EU	Stay out	Neither	Lead
22–26 Sep 2023	Savanta	Peston	1,021	66%	15%	18%	51%
28 Apr – 3 May 2023	Savanta	Peston	1,021	77%	13%	11%	64%

==== Change of relationship ====
From November 2024, Opinium starting polling regarding a change of relationship with the EU.

Question: Thinking about Brexit, which of the following comes closest to your view?
Dates conducted	Pollster	Client	Sample size	Rejoin	Closer	The same	More distant	Don't know
15–17 Apr 2026	Opinium	The Observer	2,014	34%	22%	17%	12%	15%
21–23 Jan 2026	Opinium	The Observer	2,050	34%	23%	17%	13%	13%
10–12 Dec 2025	Opinium	The Observer	2,053	31%	25%	19%	14%	12%
26–28 Nov 2025	Opinium	The Observer	2,050	35%	21%	17%	13%	13%
26–28 Mar 2025	Opinium	The Observer	2,050	34%	25%	16%	12%	12%
22–24 Jan 2025	Opinium	The Observer	2,050	33%	23%	17%	14%	13%
18–20 Dec 2024	Opinium	The Observer	2,010	32%	24%	17%	14%	13%
27–29 Nov 2024	Opinium	The Observer	2,050	32%	23%	18%	14%	13%

The available responses were;

We should rejoin the EU

We should remain outside the EU but negotiate a closer relationship with them than we have now

We should remain outside the EU and keep the same relationship with the EU as we have now

We should remain outside the EU and negotiate a more distant relationship with them than we have now

==== Holding a referendum ====
In January 2023, Savanta published a poll of 2,065 British adults, which included a question regarding support for a referendum on the UK rejoining the EU. A combined total of 65% were in favour of such a referendum now or at some point in the future and 24% were opposed to such a referendum.

Question: When do you think, if at all, there should next be a referendum on whether or not the UK should re-join or stay out of the European Union?

Now	22%
In the next five years	24%
In the next 6–10 years	11%
In the next 11–20 years	4%
In more than 20 years time	4%
Never	24%
Don't know	11%

==== Scotland polls ====
There has also been polling of voters in Scotland on whether the United Kingdom should rejoin the European Union.

==== 2026 ====
Dates conducted	Pollster	Client	Sample size	Rejoin	Stay out	Neither	Lead
16–23 Oct 2026	YouGov	Scottish Election Study	1,595	66%	19%	15%	47%
11–26 Jun 2026	YouGov	Scottish Election Study	2,214	64%	21%	15%	43%
11–18 Feb 2026	YouGov	Scottish Election Study	1,517	64%	21%	15%	43%
29 Jan – 6 Feb 2026	Savanta	BBC Scotland	2,136	65%	25%	10%	40%
08–12 Jan 2026	Survation	True North Advisors	1,003	67%	25%	8%	42%

==== 2025 ====
Dates conducted	Pollster	Client	Sample size	Rejoin	Stay out	Neither	Lead
10–20 Oct 2025	YouGov	Scottish Election Study	1,242	63%	21%	15%	42%
13–19 Jun 2025	YouGov	Scottish Election Study	1,206	62%	23%	15%	39%
25 Feb – 3 Mar 2025	YouGov	Scottish Election Study	1,200	63%	21%	16%	42%

==== 2024 ====
Dates conducted	Pollster	Client	Sample size	Rejoin	Stay out	Neither	Lead
25–30 Oct 2024	YouGov	Scottish Election Study	1,303	60%	22%	18%	38%

=== In the European Union ===
==== Fifth anniversary polling ====
In 2021, for the fifth anniversary of the UK's EU membership referendum, Euronews commissioned an opinion poll conducted by Redfield & Wilton Strategies of attitudes to the European Union and Brexit in the EU's four largest countries. Redfield & Wilton polled 1,500 people in each member-state between 6 and 7 June 2021. The poll included the following question about how responders would feel about the UK re-joining the EU:

Question: Would you support or oppose the UK re-joining the EU?
Member states	Support	Oppose	Neither	Don't know	Lead
France	36%	18%	34%	12%	18%
Germany	40%	19%	30%	11%	21%
Italy	43%	14%	34%	8%	29%
Spain	46%	16%	31%	7%	30%

==== Polling on a Franco-German four-tier EU Structure ====
Following reports in 2023 of a Franco-German proposal for a four-tiered EU structure, YouGov Eurotrack conducted polling in several EU Member States. This polling included attitudes towards further EU enlargement. People from Denmark, France, Germany, Italy, Spain, and Sweden were asked;

Question: Do you think each of the following countries should or should not be allowed to join the European Union at this time?
Member states	Sample size	UK should be allowed to join	UK should not be allowed to join	Don't know	Lead
France	1,026	46%	30%	24%	16%
Germany	2,457	60%	22%	17%	38%
Denmark	1,008	68%	13%	19%	55%
Sweden	1,008	70%	10%	20%	60%
Spain	1,056	49%	30%	21%	19%
Italy	1,022	48%	29%	27%	19%

Fieldwork was conducted between the 6th and 26th of October 2023.

== See also ==
- Opinion polling on the United Kingdom's membership of the European Union (2016–2020)
- Accession of the United Kingdom to the European Communities
- Potential enlargement of the European Union
- United Kingdom membership of the European Union
