= All-Party Parliamentary Group on Europe =

Cross-party political grouping within the UK Parliament

Logo of the APPG on Europe

The All-Party Parliamentary Group on Europe is an all-party parliamentary group of the Parliament of the United Kingdom. Its primary focus is on improving the United Kingdom's relationship with the European Union. Its inaugural meeting was held in October 2024.

It describes its purpose as being "to promote informed debate and dialogue among parliamentarians on the UK’s evolving relationship with Europe, including the European Union institutions and its Member States, and to develop constructive recommendations that strengthen cooperation in areas of mutual interest and benefit."

Its co-chairs are the Labour Party MP, Rosena Allin-Khan and the Conservative Party life peer, Lord Kirkhope. Its vice-chairs are Wera Hobhouse of the Liberal Democrats and Ellie Chowns of the Green Party.

The secretariat for the APPG is provided by the pro-European pressure group European Movement UK. The APPG is planning to have working meetings every two months in 2025.

== See also ==
- Post-Brexit United Kingdom relations with the European Union
