= Opinion polling on the United Kingdom's membership of the European Union (2016–2020) =

Surveying from Brexit referendum to 2020

Following the referendum in the United Kingdom on its membership of the European Union on 23 June 2016, polling companies continued to use standard questions in order to gauge public opinion on the country's relationship with the EU. Opinion polling overall showed an initial fall in support for Brexit from the referendum to late 2016, when responses were split evenly between support and opposition. Support rose again to a plurality, which held until the 2017 general election. Since then, opinion polls tended to show a plurality of support for remaining in the EU or for the view that Brexit was a mistake, with the estimated margin increasing until a small decrease in 2019 (to 53% Remain : 47% Leave, as of October 2019). This seems to be largely due to a preference for remaining in the EU among those who did not vote in 2016's referendum (an estimated 2.5 million of whom, as of October 2019, were too young to vote at the time). Other reasons suggested include slightly more Leave voters than Remain voters (14% and 12% of each, respectively, as of October 2019) changing how they would vote (particularly in Labour areas) and the deaths of older voters, most of whom voted to leave the EU.

== Right/wrong ==
Opinion polling on whether the UK was right or wrong to vote to leave the EU Right Wrong Neither

Following the EU referendum, there have been numerous opinion polls on the question of whether the UK was 'right' or 'wrong' to vote to leave the EU. The results of these polls are shown in the table below.

Date(s) conducted	Right	Wrong	Undecided	Lead	Sample	Conducted by	Polling type	Notes
4–5 Aug 2020	39%	49%	12%	10%	1,606	YouGov	Online	
30–31 Jul 2020	41%	47%	13%	6%	1,623	YouGov	Online	
22–23 Jul 2020	42%	47%	11%	5%	1,648	YouGov	Online	
11–12 Jun 2020	40%	47%	13%	7%	1,693	YouGov	Online	
29–30 May 2020	42%	45%	13%	3%	1,650	YouGov	Online	
18–19 May 2020	43%	45%	13%	2%	1,718	YouGov	Online	
16–17 Apr 2020	43%	44%	13%	1%	2,015	YouGov	Online	
24–26 Mar 2020	48%	40%	12%	8%	1,010	Number Cruncher Politics	Online	
9–10 Feb 2020	43%	44%	13%	1%	1,694	YouGov	Online	
31 Jan – 2 Feb 2020	43%	46%	12%	3%	1,575	YouGov	Online	
31 Jan 2020	The UK leaves the EU and begins the Brexit transition period.							
30–31 Jan 2020	43%	46%	11%	3%	1,015	Survation	Online	
24–26 Jan 2020	40%	47%	13%	7%	1,628	YouGov	Online	
12 Dec 2019	2019 United Kingdom general election							
8–10 Dec 2019	44%	46%	10%	2%	1,009	Number Cruncher Politics	Online	
11–12 Nov 2019	41%	47%	11%	6%	1,619	YouGov	Online	
5–6 Nov 2019	40%	49%	11%	9%	1,667	YouGov	Online	
22–23 Oct 2019	41%	47%	12%	6%	1,640	YouGov	Online	
20–21 Oct 2019	41%	47%	11%	6%	1,689	YouGov	Online	
17–18 Oct 2019	42%	46%	12%	4%	1,609	YouGov	Online	
17 Oct 2019	EU and UK negotiators agree a new withdrawal agreement.							
14–15 Oct 2019	42%	47%	11%	5%	1,625	YouGov	Online	
8–9 Oct 2019	42%	48%	10%	6%	1,616	YouGov	Online	
30 Sep – 1 Oct 2019	40%	49%	11%	9%	1,623	YouGov	Online	
2–3 Sep 2019	41%	48%	11%	7%	1,639	YouGov	Online	
28–29 Aug 2019	40%	50%	10%	10%	1,867	YouGov	Online	
27–28 Aug 2019	41%	47%	13%	6%	2,006	YouGov	Online	
22–23 Aug 2019	41%	48%	11%	7%	2,019	YouGov	Online	
13–14 Aug 2019	42%	46%	11%	4%	1,625	YouGov	Online	
5–6 Aug 2019	41%	47%	13%	6%	1,628	YouGov	Online	
29–30 Jul 2019	41%	49%	11%	8%	2,066	YouGov	Online	
24 July 2019	Boris Johnson replaces Theresa May as Prime Minister							
16–17 Jul 2019	40%	47%	12%	7%	1,749	YouGov	Online	
2–3 Jul 2019	41%	48%	11%	7%	1,605	YouGov	Online	
9–10 Jun 2019	41%	47%	12%	6%	1,702	YouGov	Online	
5–6 Jun 2019	42%	47%	11%	5%	1,670	YouGov	Online	
28–29 May 2019	41%	46%	13%	5%	1,763	YouGov	Online	
23 May 2019	2019 European Parliament election in the United Kingdom							
10–11 Apr 2019	41%	48%	11%	7%	1,843	YouGov	Online	
2–3 Apr 2019	42%	47%	11%	5%	1,771	YouGov	Online	
31 Mar – 1 Apr 2019	42%	47%	11%	5%	2,098	YouGov	Online	
29 Mar 2019	The House of Commons votes to reject the Government's proposed withdrawal agreement for the third time.							
24–25 Mar 2019	41%	48%	12%	7%	2,110	YouGov	Online	
14–15 Mar 2019	41%	49%	10%	8%	1,823	YouGov	Online	
12 Mar 2019	The House of Commons votes to reject the Government's proposed withdrawal agreement for the second time.							
7–8 Mar 2019	40%	48%	12%	8%	1,787	YouGov	Online	
6–7 Mar 2019	40%	49%	11%	9%	1,800	YouGov	Online	
22–23 Feb 2019	40%	48%	13%	8%	1,672	YouGov	Online	
3–4 Feb 2019	39%	48%	13%	9%	1,851	YouGov	Online	
30–31 Jan 2019	41%	48%	11%	7%	1,650	YouGov	Online	
18 Jan 2019	41%	43%	16%	2%	1,021	Sky Data	Online	
16 Jan 2019	40%	50%	10%	10%	1,070	YouGov	Online	
15 Jan 2019	The House of Commons votes to reject the Government's proposed withdrawal agreement for the first time.							
13–14 Jan 2019	40%	48%	12%	8%	1,701	YouGov	Online	
7–8 Jan 2019	41%	47%	12%	6%	1,754	YouGov	Online	
6–7 Jan 2019	39%	48%	12%	9%	1,656	YouGov	Online	
21 Dec 2018 – 4 Jan 2019	40%	48%	12%	8%	25,537	YouGov	Online	
18–19 Dec 2018	40%	47%	13%	7%	1,675	YouGov	Online	
12–14 Dec 2018	41%	47%	12%	6%	5,043	YouGov	Online	
3–4 Dec 2018	38%	49%	13%	11%	1,624	YouGov	Online	
9–30 Nov 2018	Ministers including Brexit Secretary Dominic Raab and Work and Pensions Secretary Esther McVey resign in protest to the government's proposed withdrawal agreement (or to plans preceding it).							
26–27 Nov 2018	42%	48%	11%	6%	1,737	YouGov	Online	
19–20 Nov 2018	41%	47%	12%	6%	1,647	YouGov	Online	
15 Nov 2018	40%	47%	12%	7%	1,311	YouGov	Online	
14 Nov 2018	The UK Cabinet approves a new draft withdrawal agreement.							
4–5 Nov 2018	41%	45%	14%	4%	1,637	YouGov	Online	
22–23 Oct 2018	41%	47%	12%	6%	1,802	YouGov	Online	
18–19 Oct 2018	41%	47%	12%	6%	2,158	YouGov	Online	
14–15 Oct 2018	42%	45%	13%	3%	1,649	YouGov	Online	
10–11 Oct 2018	41%	46%	13%	5%	1,800	YouGov	Online	
8–9 Oct 2018	40%	47%	13%	7%	1,647	YouGov	Online	
3–4 Oct 2018	42%	46%	12%	4%	1,746	YouGov	Online	
30 Sep-1 Oct 2018	42%	47%	11%	5%	1,607	YouGov	Online	
21–22 Sep 2018	42%	46%	12%	4%	1,643	YouGov	Online	
18–19 Sep 2018	40%	47%	12%	7%	2,509	YouGov	Online	
12–13 Sep 2018	42%	46%	12%	4%	1,620	YouGov	Online	
4–5 Sep 2018	43%	46%	11%	3%	1,628	YouGov	Online	
3–4 Sep 2018	42%	48%	11%	6%	1,883	YouGov	Online	
28–29 Aug 2018	42%	47%	11%	5%	1,664	YouGov	Online	
20–21 Aug 2018	41%	47%	12%	6%	1,697	YouGov	Online	
13–14 Aug 2018	43%	45%	12%	2%	1,660	YouGov	Online	
9–13 Aug 2018	43%	47%	10%	4%	1,036	Number Cruncher Politics	Online	
8–9 Aug 2018	42%	45%	13%	3%	1,675	YouGov	Online	
22–23 Jul 2018	42%	46%	12%	4%	1,650	YouGov	Online	
16–17 Jul 2018	42%	47%	12%	5%	1,657	YouGov	Online	
10–11 Jul 2018	41%	46%	12%	5%	1,732	YouGov	Online	
8–9 Jul 2018	Brexit Secretary David Davis and Foreign Secretary Boris Johnson resign.							
8–9 Jul 2018	42%	46%	12%	4%	1,669	YouGov	Online	
6 Jul 2018	The UK Cabinet agrees the Chequers statement, setting out a proposal on the future UK–EU relationship.							
3–4 Jul 2018	41%	46%	13%	5%	1,641	YouGov	Online	
25–26 Jun 2018	43%	46%	11%	3%	1,645	YouGov	Online	
19–20 Jun 2018	44%	45%	11%	1%	1,663	YouGov	Online	
18–19 Jun 2018	43%	44%	13%	1%	1,606	YouGov	Online	
11–12 Jun 2018	43%	46%	12%	3%	1,638	YouGov	Online	
4–5 Jun 2018	44%	44%	13%	0%	1,619	YouGov	Online	
28–29 May 2018	40%	47%	13%	7%	1,670	YouGov	Online	
20–21 May 2018	43%	44%	13%	1%	1,660	YouGov	Online	
13–14 May 2018	44%	45%	12%	1%	1,634	YouGov	Online	
8–9 May 2018	43%	45%	12%	2%	1,648	YouGov	Online	
30 Apr-1 May 2018	42%	47%	11%	5%	1,585	YouGov	Online	
24–25 Apr 2018	42%	45%	13%	3%	1,668	YouGov	Online	
16–17 Apr 2018	42%	45%	13%	3%	1,631	YouGov	Online	
9–10 Apr 2018	42%	46%	12%	4%	1,639	YouGov	Online	
26–27 Mar 2018	42%	45%	13%	3%	1,659	YouGov	Online	
16–23 Mar 2018	44%	48%	7%	4%	1,616	Sky Data	Online	
5–6 Mar 2018	43%	45%	12%	2%	1,641	YouGov	Online	
2 Mar 2018	Theresa May makes Mansion House speech, outlining the UK Government's policy on the future UK–EU relationship.							
26–27 Feb 2018	44%	45%	11%	1%	1,622	YouGov	Online	
19–20 Feb 2018	42%	45%	12%	3%	1,650	YouGov	Online	
12–13 Feb 2018	42%	46%	12%	4%	1,639	YouGov	Online	
5–6 Feb 2018	43%	44%	13%	1%	2,000	YouGov	Online	
28–29 Jan 2018	40%	46%	14%	6%	1,669	YouGov	Online	
16–17 Jan 2018	45%	44%	12%	1%	1,672	YouGov	Online	
7–8 Jan 2018	42%	46%	12%	4%	1,663	YouGov	Online	
19–20 Dec 2017	42%	45%	12%	3%	1,610	YouGov	Online	
15 Dec 2017	The European Council decides to proceed to the second phase of the Brexit negotiations.							
10–11 Dec 2017	44%	45%	11%	1%	1,680	YouGov	Online	
4–5 Dec 2017	42%	45%	13%	3%	1,638	YouGov	Online	
26–28 Nov 2017	42%	44%	14%	2%	3,282	YouGov	Online	
7–8 Nov 2017	42%	46%	12%	4%	2,012	YouGov	Online	
23–24 Oct 2017	43%	45%	12%	2%	1,637	YouGov	Online	
19–20 Oct 2017	42%	44%	14%	2%	1,603	YouGov	Online	
18–19 Oct 2017	42%	45%	14%	3%	1,648	YouGov	Online	
10–11 Oct 2017	42%	47%	11%	5%	1,680	YouGov	Online	
22–24 Sep 2017	44%	45%	11%	1%	1,716	YouGov	Online	
22 Sep 2017	Theresa May makes Florence speech, in an attempt to 'unblock' the Brexit negotiations.							
30–31 Aug 2017	44%	44%	12%	0%	1,658	YouGov	Online	
21–22 Aug 2017	43%	45%	11%	2%	1,664	YouGov	Online	
31 Jul-1 Aug 2017	45%	45%	10%	0%	1,665	YouGov	Online	
18–19 Jul 2017	43%	43%	14%	0%	1,593	YouGov	Online	
10–11 Jul 2017	45%	43%	12%	2%	1,700	YouGov	Online	
21–22 Jun 2017	44%	45%	11%	1%	1,670	YouGov	Online	
19 Jun 2017	Brexit negotiations begin.							
12–13 Jun 2017	44%	45%	11%	1%	1,651	YouGov	Online	
8 Jun 2017	2017 United Kingdom general election							
5–7 Jun 2017	45%	45%	10%	0%	2,130	YouGov	Online	
30–31 May 2017	44%	45%	11%	1%	1,875	YouGov	Online	
24–25 May 2017	46%	43%	11%	3%	2,052	YouGov	Online	
16–17 May 2017	46%	43%	11%	3%	1,861	YouGov	Online	
3–14 May 2017	45%	41%	14%	4%	1,952	GfK	Online	
9–10 May 2017	44%	45%	11%	1%	1,651	YouGov	Online	
2–3 May 2017	46%	43%	11%	3%	2,066	YouGov	Online	
25–26 Apr 2017	43%	45%	12%	2%	1,590	YouGov	Online	
20–21 Apr 2017	44%	44%	12%	0%	1,590	YouGov	Online	
18–19 Apr 2017	46%	43%	11%	3%	1,727	YouGov	Online	
12–13 Apr 2017	45%	43%	12%	2%	2,069	YouGov	Online	
5–6 Apr 2017	46%	42%	11%	4%	1,651	YouGov	Online	
29 Mar 2017	The United Kingdom invokes Article 50.							
26–27 Mar 2017	44%	43%	13%	1%	1,957	YouGov	Online	
20–21 Mar 2017	44%	44%	12%	0%	1,627	YouGov	Online	
1–15 Mar 2017	46%	41%	13%	5%	1,938	GfK	Online	
13–14 Mar 2017	44%	42%	15%	2%	1,631	YouGov	Online	
10–14 Mar 2017	49%	41%	10%	8%	2,003	Opinium	Online	
27–28 Feb 2017	45%	44%	11%	1%	1,666	YouGov	Online	
21–22 Feb 2017	45%	45%	10%	0%	2,060	YouGov	Online	
12–13 Feb 2017	46%	42%	12%	4%	2,052	YouGov	Online	
30–31 Jan 2017	45%	42%	12%	3%	1,705	YouGov	Online	
17–18 Jan 2017	46%	42%	12%	4%	1,654	YouGov	Online	
17 Jan 2017	Theresa May makes Lancaster House speech, setting out the UK Government's negotiating priorities.							
9–12 Jan 2017	52%	39%	9%	13%	2,005	Opinium	Online	
9–10 Jan 2017	46%	42%	12%	4%	1,660	YouGov	Online	
3–4 Jan 2017	45%	44%	11%	1%	1,740	YouGov	Online	
18–19 Dec 2016	44%	44%	12%	0%	1,595	YouGov	Online	
4–5 Dec 2016	44%	42%	14%	2%	1,667	YouGov	Online	
28–29 Nov 2016	44%	45%	11%	1%	1,624	YouGov	Online	
14–15 Nov 2016	46%	43%	11%	3%	1,717	YouGov	Online	
19–20 Oct 2016	45%	44%	11%	1%	1,608	YouGov	Online	
11–12 Oct 2016	45%	44%	11%	1%	1,669	YouGov	Online	
2 Oct 2016	Theresa May makes Conservative Party Conference speech, announcing her intention to invoke Article 50 by 31 March 2017.							
13–14 Sep 2016	46%	44%	10%	2%	1,732	YouGov	Online	
30–31 Aug 2016	47%	44%	9%	3%	1,687	YouGov	Online	
22–23 Aug 2016	45%	43%	12%	2%	1,660	YouGov	Online	
16–17 Aug 2016	46%	43%	11%	3%	1,677	YouGov	Online	
8–9 Aug 2016	45%	44%	12%	1%	1,692	YouGov	Online	
1–2 Aug 2016	46%	42%	12%	4%	1,722	YouGov	Online	
13 Jul 2016	Theresa May becomes Prime Minister of the United Kingdom.							

=== Selective polling ===
Date(s) conducted	Right	Wrong	Undecided	Lead	Sample	Conducted by	Polling type	Notes
26 Feb – 1 Mar 2019	22%	70%	8%	48%	5,004	YouGov	Online	Labour 2017 voters living in Northern England and the Midlands
5–8 Jul 2018	76%	21%	2%	55%	966	YouGov	Online	Conservative Party members

== Remain/leave ==
With "Neither" responses

Normalised

Opinion polling (since the 2016 referendum) on whether the UK should leave or remain in the EU
Leave
Remain

There have also been polls to gauge support for remaining in or leaving the EU. The following polls, unless the notes state otherwise, asked how respondents would vote in a second referendum.

Date(s) conducted	Remain	Leave	Neither	Lead	Sample	Conducted by	Polling type	Notes
18–21 Oct 2019	55%	45%	—	10%	2,017	Deltapoll	Online	"Neither" removed
17 Oct 2019	EU and UK negotiators agree a new withdrawal agreement.							
2–14 Oct 2019	32%	54%	14%	22%	26,000	ComRes		(Note: Question does not explicitly ask how respondents would vote in a referendum.) (Note: Question asked in poll: "Regardless of the way you voted in the 2016 referendum, do you support or oppose the UK abiding by the referendum result and leaving the EU?")
9–11 Oct 2019	51%	45%	3%	6%	1,622	Panelbase	Online	Likely voters
25 Sep 2019	51%	45%	4%	6%	821	Survation	Online	Likely voters
5–9 Sep 2019	37%	34%	29%	3%	1,144	Kantar	Online	
5–7 Sep 2019	46%	40%	14%	6%	2,049	Deltapoll	Online	
5–6 Sep 2019	52%	45%	3%	7%	864	Panelbase	Online	Likely voters
5–6 Sep 2019	50%	44%	6%	6%	809	Survation	Online	Likely voters
3–4 Sep 2019	46%	43%	12%	3%	1,533	YouGov	Online	
29–31 Aug 2019	46%	41%	13%	5%	2,028	Deltapoll	Online	
29–30 Aug 2019	51%	46%	3%	6%	861	Survation	Online	Likely voters
15–19 Aug 2019	36%	35%	29%	1%	1,133	Kantar	Online	
14–15 Aug 2019	45%	40%	15%	5%	1,696	YouGov	Online	
6–11 Aug 2019	52%	43%	5%	9%	1,658	Survation	Online	Likely voters
28–29 Jul 2019	46%	41%	13%	5%	1,652	YouGov	Online	
25–27 Jul 2019	45%	41%	13%	4%	2,001	Deltapoll	Online	
24 Jul 2019	Boris Johnson replaces Theresa May as Prime Minister							
19–20 Jun 2019	51%	44%	5%	7%	1,658	Survation	Online	Likely voters
4–7 Jun 2019	48%	44%	8%	4%	1,345	BMG Research	Online	
23 May 2019	2019 European Parliament election in the United Kingdom							
22 May 2019	47%	48%	5%	1%	1,596	Survation	Online	Likely voters
14–21 May 2019	52%	45%	3%	7%	1,619	Panelbase	Online	Likely voters
17 May 2019	49%	47%	4%	2%	797	Survation	Online	Likely voters
12–13 May 2019	44%	42%	14%	2%	2,131	YouGov	Online	
9–13 May 2019	42%	33%	24%	9%	1,152	Kantar	Online	
7–10 May 2019	52%	41%	7%	11%	1,393	BMG Research	Online	
30 Apr – 1 May 2019	44%	40%	15%	4%	1,867	YouGov	Online	
18–24 Apr 2019	51%	45%	4%	5%	1,620	Panelbase	Online	Likely voters
16 Apr 2019	52%	38%	10%	14%	1,061	ComRes	Online	
4–8 Apr 2019	41%	35%	24%	5%	1,172	Kantar	Online	
2–5 Apr 2019	51%	42%	8%	9%	1,338	BMG Research	Online	
28–30 Mar 2019	54%	46%	—	8%	1,010	Deltapoll	Online	"Neither" removed
29 Mar 2019	The House of Commons votes to reject the Government's proposed withdrawal agreement for the third time.							
19 Mar 2019	46%	41%	14%	5%	2,084	YouGov	Online	
15–17 Mar 2019	45%	39%	16%	6%	2,033	ComRes	Online	
15 Mar 2019	51%	45%	5%	6%	831	Survation	Online	Likely voters
12 Mar 2019	The House of Commons votes to reject the Government's proposed withdrawal agreement for the second time.							
7–11 Mar 2019	40%	32%	28%	7%	1,152	Kantar	Online	
4–8 Mar 2019	49%	42%	9%	7%	1,330	BMG Research	Online	
4–5 Mar 2019	46%	39%	15%	8%	2,042	ComRes	Online	
21–23 Feb 2019	45%	41%	13%	4%	1,027	Deltapoll	Online	
18 Feb 2019	47%	44%	8%	3%	849	Survation	Online	Likely voters
17–18 Feb 2019	48%	38%	14%	10%	1,832	YouGov	Online	
8–11 Feb 2019	43%	43%	13%	0%	2,004	Deltapoll	Online	
7–11 Feb 2019	43%	35%	22%	8%	1,145	Kantar	Online	
4–8 Feb 2019	50%	40%	9%	10%	1,363	BMG Research	Online	
30 Jan 2019	52%	43%	6%	9%	847	Survation	Online	Likely voters
22–23 Jan 2019	45%	38%	16%	7%	1,699	YouGov	Online	
16–17 Jan 2019	48%	42%	11%	6%	2,083	ORB	Online	
16–17 Jan 2019	47%	39%	14%	7%	2,031	ComRes	Online	
16 Jan 2019	48%	38%	14%	10%	1,070	YouGov	Online	
15 Jan 2019	The House of Commons votes to reject the Government's proposed withdrawal agreement for the first time.							
14–15 Jan 2019	44%	40%	16%	4%	2,010	ComRes	Online	
10–14 Jan 2019	44%	35%	21%	8%	1,106	Kantar	Online	
10–11 Jan 2019	47%	45%	8%	2%	808	Survation	Online	Likely voters
8-11 Jan 2019	49%	41%	10%	8%	1,344	BMG Research	Online	
21 Dec 2018 – 4 Jan 2019	46%	39%	15%	7%	25,537	YouGov	Online	
16–17 Dec 2018	45%	41%	14%	4%	1,660	YouGov	Online	
14–15 Dec 2018	46%	37%	17%	9%	1,660	YouGov	Online	
13–14 Dec 2018	44%	43%	12%	1%	2,022	Deltapoll	Online	
4–7 Dec 2018	52%	40%	7%	12%	1,379	BMG Research	Online	
5–6 Dec 2018	36%	33%	31%	3%	1,178	Kantar	Online	
30 Nov – 3 Dec 2018	45%	45%	10%	0%	2,007	Opinium		
9–30 Nov 2018	Ministers including Brexit Secretary Dominic Raab and Work and Pensions Secretary Esther McVey resign in protest to the government's proposed withdrawal agreement (or to plans preceding it).							
28–29 Nov 2018	47%	39%	14%	8%	1,655	YouGov	Online	
22–23 Nov 2018	46%	42%	12%	4%	1,691	YouGov	Online	
15 Nov 2018	50%	45%	5%	5%	874	Survation	Online	Likely voters
14–15 Nov 2018	46%	40%	14%	6%	1,153	YouGov	Online	
14–15 Nov 2018	45%	43%	12%	2%	2,000	ComRes	Online	Not weighted by 2016 vote
14 Nov 2018	The UK Cabinet approves a new draft withdrawal agreement.							
8-12 Nov 2018	39%	34%	27%	5%	1,147	Kantar	Online	
7–9 Nov 2018	45%	41%	13%	4%	3,344	YouGov	Online	
6–9 Nov 2018	49%	42%	9%	7%	1,339	BMG Research	Online	
2–7 Nov 2018	51%	46%	4%	5%	1,674	Panelbase	Online	Likely voters
24 Oct – 6 Nov 2018	47%	40%	13%	7%	8,154	Populus	Online	
20 Oct – 2 Nov 2018	50%	44%	7%	6%	16,337	Survation	Online	Likely voters
24–26 Oct 2018	40%	40%	20%	0%	1,017	Deltapoll	Online	
22–23 Oct 2018	46%	41%	13%	5%	1,802	YouGov	Online	
11–15 Oct 2018	38%	35%	28%	3%	1,128	Kantar	Online	
3–5 Oct 2018	48%	41%	11%	7%	1,346	BMG Research	Online	
28–29 Sep 2018	47%	43%	10%	4%	1,075	BMG Research	Online	
8–26 Sep 2018	51%	34%	15%	17%	941	Kantar Public	Face to face	Respondents aged 15+; unweighted
21–22 Sep 2018	48%	42%	10%	6%	901	BMG Research	Online	
20–21 Sep 2018	43%	43%	13%	0%	1,762	YouGov	Online	
6–10 Sep 2018	42%	35%	23%	7%	1,119	Kantar	Online	
7–9 Sep 2018	46%	42%	11%	4%	2,051	ICM	Online	
7 Sep 2018	47%	46%	8%	1%	854	Survation	Online	Likely voters
7 Sep 2018	46%	44%	10%	2%	975	Survation	Online	Possible voters
4–7 Sep 2018	47%	43%	10%	4%	1,372	BMG Research	Online	
28 Aug – 4 Sep 2018	46%	42%	12%	4%	10,215	YouGov	Online	
31 Jul – 4 Sep 2018	46%	41%	13%	5%	25,641	YouGov	Online	
31 Aug – 1 Sep 2018	47%	47%	6%	0%	864	Survation	Online	Likely voters
21–22 Aug 2018	46%	42%	12%	4%	1,667	YouGov	Online	
14–20 Aug 2018	46%	41%	13%	5%	10,299	YouGov	Online	
31 Jul – 20 Aug 2018	46%	40%	13%	6%	18,772	YouGov	Online	
9–13 Aug 2018	40%	35%	25%	5%	1,119	Kantar	Online	
6–10 Aug 2018	50%	43%	7%	7%	1,316	BMG Research	Online	With squeeze responses.
6–10 Aug 2018	49%	41%	10%	8%	1,316	BMG Research	Online	Without squeeze responses.
31 Jul – 7 Aug 2018	46%	40%	14%	6%	10,121	YouGov	Online	
26–31 Jul 2018	46%	41%	13%	5%	4,957	YouGov	Online	
25–26 Jul 2018	45%	42%	13%	3%	1,631	YouGov	Online	
23–24 Jul 2018	47%	41%	12%	6%	1,627	YouGov	Online	
23–24 Jul 2018	47%	44%	9%	3%	1,627	YouGov	Online	
19–20 Jul 2018	44%	40%	16%	4%	1,668	YouGov	Online	
12–14 Jul 2018	45%	45%	11%	0%	1,484	Deltapoll	Online	
8–9 Jul 2018	Brexit Secretary David Davis and Foreign Secretary Boris Johnson resign.							
5–9 Jul 2018	40%	32%	28%	8%	1,086	Kantar	Online	
7 Jul 2018	49%	45%	5%	4%	855	Survation	Online	Likely voters
6 Jul 2018	The UK Cabinet agrees the Chequers statement, setting out a proposal on the future UK–EU relationship.							
28 Jun – 6 Jul 2018	47%	41%	13%	6%	10,383	YouGov	Online	
3–5 Jul 2018	51%	45%	5%	6%	1,359	BMG Research	Online	With squeeze responses.
3–5 Jul 2018	49%	43%	8%	6%	1,359	BMG Research	Online	Without squeeze responses.
26–27 Jun 2018	44%	44%	12%	0%	1,626	YouGov	Online	
19–20 Jun 2018	50%	44%	6%	6%	866	Survation	Online	Likely voters
10–11 Jun 2018	45%	40%	15%	5%	1,654	YouGov	Online	
5–8 Jun 2018	48%	45%	6%	3%	1,350	BMG Research	Online	With squeeze responses.
5–8 Jun 2018	46%	43%	10%	3%	1,350	BMG Research	Online	Without squeeze responses.
31 May – 4 Jun 2018	48%	47%	6%	1%	1,724	Survation	Online	Likely voters
9–16 May 2018	47%	42%	11%	5%	2,006	Deltapoll	Online	
8–10 May 2018	47%	47%	6%	0%	1,585	Survation	Online	
1–4 May 2018	49%	44%	7%	5%	1,361	BMG Research	Online	With squeeze responses.
1–4 May 2018	47%	43%	11%	4%	1,361	BMG Research	Online	Without squeeze responses.
25–30 Apr 2018	45%	42%	13%	3%	1,637	YouGov	Online	
14 Apr 2018	47%	46%	7%	1%	1,746	Survation	Online	Likely voters
10–13 Apr 2018	51%	42%	6%	9%	1,432	BMG Research	Online	With squeeze responses.
10–13 Apr 2018	49%	40%	10%	9%	1,432	BMG Research	Online	Without squeeze responses.
6–8 Apr 2018	45%	44%	11%	1%	2,012	ICM	Online	
5–6 Apr 2018	44%	41%	15%	3%	1,636	YouGov	Online	
23–26 Mar 2018	45%	44%	11%	1%	1,658	YouGov	Online	
13-16 Mar 2018	50%	44%	6%	6%	1,658	BMG Research	Online	With squeeze responses.
13-16 Mar 2018	49%	42%	9%	7%	1,658	BMG Research	Online	Without squeeze responses.
7–8 Mar 2018	44%	49%	7%	5%	2,092	ORB	Online	Not weighted by 2016 vote
2 Mar 2018	43%	46%	12%	3%	1,096	ComRes	Online	Not weighted by 2016 vote
2 Mar 2018	Theresa May makes Mansion House speech, outlining the UK Government's policy on the future UK–EU relationship.							
27–28 Feb 2018	44%	41%	14%	3%	1,646	YouGov	Online	
14–16 Feb 2018	46%	42%	13%	4%	1,482	Sky Data	Online	
6–9 Feb 2018	47%	44%	9%	3%	1,325	BMG Research	Online	
26–29 Jan 2018	49%	46%	6%	3%	912	Survation	Online	Likely voters
18–22 Jan 2018	46%	42%	12%	4%	1,633	YouGov	Online	
16–19 Jan 2018	49%	41%	10%	8%	1,096	Sky Data	Online	
10–19 Jan 2018	45%	43%	12%	2%	5,075	ICM	Online	
9–12 Jan 2018	48%	44%	9%	4%	1,373	BMG Research	Online	
11 Jan 2018	51%	43%	6%	8%	1,049	ComRes	Online	Not weighted by 2016 vote
13–19 Dec 2017	39%	48%	13%	9%	1,692	YouGov	Online	
15 Dec 2017	The European Council decides to proceed to the second phase of the Brexit negotiations.							
8–10 Dec 2017	46%	43%	11%	3%	2,006	ICM	Online	
5–8 Dec 2017	51%	41%	8%	10%	1,363	BMG Research	Online	
30 Nov – 1 Dec 2017	49%	46%	6%	3%	874	Survation	Online	Likely voters
16–17 Nov 2017	43%	43%	14%	0%	1,672	YouGov	Online	
14–17 Nov 2017	45%	45%	10%	0%	1,399	BMG Research	Online	
18–24 Oct 2017	44%	40%	16%	4%	1,648	YouGov	Online	
19–20 Oct 2017	46%	45%	9%	1%	1,005	Opinium	Online	
17-20 Oct 2017	47%	44%	8%	3%	1,360	BMG Research	Online	
4–5 Oct 2017	49%	45%	6%	3%	1,769	Survation	Online	Likely voters
26 Sep–2 Oct 2017	44%	46%	9%	2%	1,645	YouGov	Online	
23 Sep 2017	46%	47%	6%	1%	999	Survation	Online	Likely voters
22 Sep 2017	Theresa May makes Florence speech, in an attempt to 'unblock' the Brexit negotiations.							
19–22 Sep 2017	45%	44%	12%	1%	2,004	Opinium	Online	
15–20 Sep 2017	47%	47%	5%	0%	1,410	Survation	Online	Likely voters
12–15 Sep 2017	47%	43%	10%	4%	1,379	BMG Research	Online	
12–15 Sep 2017	45%	45%	10%	0%	2,009	Opinium	Online	
23–24 Aug 2017	45%	43%	12%	2%	1,729	YouGov	Online	
15–18 Aug 2017	47%	44%	9%	3%	2,006	Opinium	Online	
8-11 Aug 2017	46%	45%	9%	1%	1,358	BMG Research	Online	
23–24 Jul 2017	46%	43%	11%	3%	1,609	YouGov	Online	
14–15 Jul 2017	47%	48%	5%	1%	909	Survation	Online	Likely voters
11–14 Jul 2017	46%	45%	9%	1%	1,385	BMG Research	Online	
28–30 Jun 2017	52%	44%	5%	8%	1,017	Survation	Telephone	
23–30 Jun 2017	46%	42%	13%	4%	1,661	YouGov	Online	
16–21 Jun 2017	46%	50%	4%	4%	5,481	Panelbase	Online	
19 Jun 2017	Brexit negotiations begin.							
16–17 Jun 2017	50%	48%	3%	2%	1,005	Survation	Telephone	Likely voters
10 Jun 2017	48%	46%	6%	2%	1,036	Survation	Online	Likely voters
8 Jun 2017	2017 United Kingdom general election							
2–7 Jun 2017	46%	51%	3%	5%	3,018	Panelbase	Online	Likely voters
2–5 Jun 2017	47%	44%	9%	3%	1,363	BMG Research	Online	
26 May – 1 Jun 2017	47%	49%	4%	2%	1,224	Panelbase	Online	Likely voters
25–30 May 2017	35%	38%	27%	3%	1,199	Kantar TNS	Online	
21–22 May 2017	43%	43%	13%	0%	1,974	YouGov	Online	
19–22 May 2017	45%	45%	10%	0%	1,360	BMG Research	Online	
12–15 May 2017	47%	50%	3%	3%	1,026	Panelbase	Online	Likely voters
5–9 May 2017	47%	49%	4%	2%	1,027	Panelbase	Online	Likely voters
28 Apr – 2 May 2017	48%	49%	3%	1%	1,034	Panelbase	Online	Likely voters
21–24 Apr 2017	45%	45%	10%	0%	1,465	BMG Research	Online	
20–24 Apr 2017	46%	50%	4%	4%	1,026	Panelbase	Online	Likely voters
28–31 Mar 2017	46%	46%	8%	0%	1,437	BMG Research	Online	
23–30 Mar 2017	44%	43%	14%	1%	1,643	YouGov	Online	
29 Mar 2017	The United Kingdom invokes Article 50.							
19 Feb – 2 Mar 2017	42%	44%	15%	2%	1,784	YouGov	Online	
21–24 Feb 2017	45%	46%	9%	1%	1,477	BMG Research	Online	
19–20 Feb 2017	42%	44%	15%	2%	1,784	YouGov	Online	
19–24 Jan 2017	43%	44%	13%	1%	1,643	YouGov	Online	
17 Jan 2017	Theresa May makes Lancaster House speech, setting out the UK Government's negotiating priorities.							
6–9 Jan 2017	44%	45%	11%	1%	1,354	BMG Research	Online	
14–21 Dec 2016	44%	43%	13%	1%	1,569	YouGov	Online	
15–18 Dec 2016	45%	47%	8%	2%	2,048	ComRes	Online	
6–9 Dec 2016	43%	46%	11%	3%	1,379	BMG Research	Online	
21 Nov – 9 Dec 2016	43%	44%	13%	1%	1,693	YouGov	Online	
28–29 Nov 2016	46%	42%	12%	4%	1,624	YouGov	Online	
25–27 Nov 2016	46%	47%	6%	1%	2,035	ComRes	Online	
22–25 Nov 2016	43%	43%	14%	0%	1,409	BMG Research	Online	
20–25 Oct 2016	44%	43%	13%	1%	1,631	YouGov	Online	
19–24 Oct 2016	45%	43%	12%	2%	1,546	BMG Research	Online	
10–12 Oct 2016	44%	44%	12%	0%	1,002	Survation	Online	
2 Oct 2016	Theresa May makes Conservative Party Conference speech, announcing her intention to invoke Article 50 by 31 March 2017.							
16–20 Sep 2016	42%	46%	11%	4%	1,601	YouGov	Online	
31 Aug – 9 Sep 2016	43%	45%	13%	2%	1,711	YouGov	Online	
21–22 Jul 2016	43%	44%	13%	1%	1,673	YouGov	Online	
13 Jul 2016	Theresa May becomes Prime Minister of the United Kingdom.							
3–4 Jul 2016	45%	45%	10%	0%	1,820	YouGov	Online	
29–30 Jun 2016	45%	37%	19%	8%	1,017	BMG Research	Telephone	
28–30 Jun 2016	48%	42%	9%	6%	2,006	Opinium	Online	
23 Jun 2016	35%	37%	28%	3%	United Kingdom European Union membership referendum, 2016 (Note: Percentages are of registered voters.)			

=== Selective polling ===
Date(s) conducted	Remain	Leave	Neither	Lead	Sample	Conducted by	Polling type	Notes
23–26 Jul 2019	46%	40%	14%	6%	1,071	YouGov	Online	Wales only
20–23 Jun 2019	69%	28%	3%	41%	1,813	YouGov	Online	Members of trade unions
16–20 May 2019	44%	41%	15%	3%	1,009	YouGov	Online	Wales only
26 Feb – 1 Mar 2019	70%	22%	8%	48%	5,004	YouGov	Online	Labour 2017 voters living in Northern England and the Midlands
26 Feb – 1 Mar 2019	69%	16%	15%	50%	5,004	YouGov	Online	Labour 2017 voters living in Northern England and the Midlands. (Note: Options are accepting the UK's proposed withdrawal agreement or remaining in the EU.)
26 Feb – 1 Mar 2019	72%	19%	10%	53%	5,004	YouGov	Online	Labour 2017 voters living in Northern England and the Midlands. (Note: Options are leaving the EU without a withdrawal agreement on trade and security or remaining in the EU.)
15–22 Feb 2019	76%	14%	10%	62%	499	BMG Research	Online	Respondents of voting age only since 2016's referendum
15–22 Feb 2019	48%	22%	30%	26%	1,125	BMG Research	Online	Non-voters
2–7 Nov 2018	61%	34%	4%	27%	914	Panelbase	Online	Scotland only; likely voters
30 Oct – 2 Nov 2018	45%	41%	14%	4%	1,031	YouGov	Online	Wales only
3–6 Oct 2018	90%	7%	2%	83%	665	YouGov	Online	SNP members; unweighted
13–18 Sep 2018	90%	7%	3%	83%	1,054	YouGov	Online	Labour Party members
6–11 Sep 2018	63%	18%	19%	45%	1,645	YouGov	Online	18–24 age group
6–11 Sep 2018	69%	13%	18%	56%	480	YouGov	Online	Respondents of voting age only since 2016's referendum
30 Aug – 5 Sep 2018	55%	37%	8%	18%	620	YouGov	Online	GMB members
30 Aug – 5 Sep 2018	68%	27%	6%	41%	1,081	YouGov	Online	UNISON members
30 Aug – 5 Sep 2018	61%	35%	4%	26%	1,058	YouGov	Online	Unite the Union members
31 Jul – 3 Sep 2018	58%	30%	11%	28%	3,051	YouGov	Online	London only
24–28 Aug 2018	60%	38%	2%	22%	1,199	Deltapoll	Online	Northern Ireland only
31 Jul – 20 Aug 2018	42%	42%	16%	0%	807	YouGov	Online	North East England only
31 Jul – 19 Aug 2018	44%	42%	14%	2%	939	YouGov	Online	Wales only
8–14 Aug 2018	58%	30%	12%	28%	1,977	YouGov	Online	Scotland only
31 Jul – 7 Aug 2018	46%	43%	11%	3%	930	YouGov	Online	South West England only
28 Jun – 2 Jul 2018	44%	39%	17%	5%	1,031	YouGov	Online	Wales only
12–15 Mar 2018	45%	44%	12%	1%	1,015	YouGov	Online	Wales only
21–24 Nov 2017	45%	40%	15%	5%	1,016	YouGov	Online	Wales only
4–7 Sep 2017	46%	42%	12%	4%	1,011	YouGov	Online	Wales only
29–31 May 2017	42%	45%	13%	3%	1,014	YouGov	Online	Wales only
18–21 May 2017	45%	43%	13%	2%	1,025	YouGov	Online	Wales only
5–7 May 2017	43%	44%	13%	1%	1,018	YouGov	Online	Wales only
19–21 Apr 2017	43%	43%	14%	0%	1,029	YouGov	Online	Wales only

== Three-option referendum ==
On 6 July 2018, the UK Cabinet agreed a statement at Chequers that set out a proposal for the future relationship between the United Kingdom and the European Union, following which two members of the Cabinet resigned. On 16 July 2018 the former Education Secretary Justine Greening noted the lack of a political consensus behind the Chequers proposal and said that, due to a 'stalemate' in the House of Commons, the issue of Brexit should be referred back to the electorate. She proposed a referendum with three options: to leave the EU on such terms as might be agreed between the UK Government and the EU 27; to leave the EU without agreed terms; or to remain in the EU. Voters would be asked to mark a first and second preference using the supplementary vote system. If there were no majority for any particular option among first-preference votes, the third-placed option would be eliminated and second preferences would be used to determine the winner from the two remaining options.

The following table shows opinion polls that have been conducted on how people would vote in a three-option referendum. The table shows the poll results for a first round in which all three options would be available, and for a second round in which only the top two options in the first round would be available.

Date(s) conducted	Round	Remain	Deal	No deal	None	Lead	Sample	Conducted by	Polling type	Notes
17–18 Oct 2019	—	45%	34%	17%	5%	11%	1,025	Survation	Online	(Note: Question was not asked in the context of a referendum.)
17–18 Oct 2019	—	41%	38%	18%	4%	3%	1,025	Survation	Online	(Note: Deal option is to leave with a withdrawal agreement, not necessarily the proposed one.)
17–18 Oct 2019	—	42%	42%	—	16%	0%	1,025	Survation	Online	
17 Oct 2019	EU and UK negotiators agree a new withdrawal agreement.									
2–14 Oct 2019	—	42%	30%	20%	8%	12%	26,000	ComRes		
5–6 Sep 2019	—	55%	—	41%	5%	14%	864	Panelbase	Online	Likely voters
24 Jul 2019	Boris Johnson replaces Theresa May as Prime Minister									
2–5 Jul 2019	—	—	26%	34%	40%	8%	1,532	BMG Research	Online	
2–5 Jul 2019	—	43%	25%	—	32%	18%	1,532	BMG Research	Online	
2–5 Jul 2019	—	44%	—	38%	18%	6%	1,532	BMG Research	Online	
23 May 2019	2019 European Parliament election in the United Kingdom									
23–24 Apr 2019	I	44%	10%	28%	18%	15%	1,787	YouGov	Online	
23–24 Apr 2019	—	45%	29%	—	26%	17%	1,787	YouGov	Online	
9–12 Apr 2019	—	45%	36%	—	19%	8%	2,007	Opinium		
29 Mar 2019	The House of Commons votes to reject the Government's proposed withdrawal agreement for the third time.									
28–29 Mar 2019	—	46%	38%	—	16%	8%	2,008	Opinium		
19 Mar 2019	—	46%	30%	—	24%	16%	2,084	YouGov	Online	
19 Mar 2019	—	46%	—	36%	18%	10%	2,084	YouGov	Online	
15 Mar 2019	—	—	36%	35%	29%	1%	1,007	Survation	Online	
14–15 Mar 2019	—	47%	32%	—	22%	15%	1,823	YouGov	Online	
14–15 Mar 2019	—	47%	—	38%	15%	9%	1,823	YouGov	Online	
12 Mar 2019	The House of Commons votes to reject the Government's proposed withdrawal agreement for the second time.									
30 Jan 2019	I	46%	19%	26%	9%	19%	1,029	Survation	Online	A new deal without the Northern Ireland backstop
10–17 Jan 2019	I	37%	23%	29%	10%	8%	1,030	Number Cruncher Politics	Online	
16 Jan 2019	—	47%	27%	—	26%	20%	1,070	YouGov	Online	
16 Jan 2019	—	48%	—	35%	16%	13%	1,070	YouGov	Online	
15 Jan 2019	The House of Commons votes to reject the Government's proposed withdrawal agreement for the first time.									
10–11 Jan 2019	I	41%	22%	30%	8%	11%	1,013	Survation	Online	
21 Dec 2018 – 4 Jan 2019	—	46%	29%	—	26%	17%	25,537	YouGov	Online	
21 Dec 2018 – 4 Jan 2019	—	46%	—	34%	20%	12%	25,537	YouGov	Online	
12–14 Dec 2018	—	45%	31%	—	23%	14%	5,043	YouGov	Online	
6–7 Dec 2018	I	45%	15%	24%	17%	21%	1,652	YouGov	Online	
6–7 Dec 2018	II	57%	—	43%	—	14%	1,652	YouGov	Online	
6–7 Dec 2018	—	47%	29%	—	24%	18%	1,652	YouGov	Online	
30 Nov – 3 Dec 2018	—	45%	33%	—	22%	12%	2,007	Opinium		
9–30 Nov 2018	Ministers including Brexit Secretary Dominic Raab and Work and Pensions Secretary Esther McVey resign in protest to the government's proposed withdrawal agreement (or to plans preceding it).									
26–27 Nov 2018	I	27%	18%	15%	40%	9%	1,013	Deltapoll	Online	
26–27 Nov 2018	II	44%	56%	—	—	12%	1,013	Deltapoll	Online	No "Neither" option.
26–27 Nov 2018	—	48%	—	52%	—	4%	1,013	Deltapoll	Online	No "Neither" option.
26–27 Nov 2018	—	—	59%	41%	—	18%	1,013	Deltapoll	Online	No "Neither" option.
23–26 Nov 2018	I	47%	17%	26%	10%	21%	1,119	Sky Data	Online	
23–26 Nov 2018	II	57%	—	43%	—	14%	1,119	Sky Data	Online	
15 Nov 2018	I	43%	16%	28%	13%	15%	1,070	Survation	Online	
15 Nov 2018	—	43%	34%	—	23%	10%	1,070	Survation	Online	
15 Nov 2018	—	—	32%	34%	34%	2%	1,070	Survation	Online	
15 Nov 2018	I	54%	14%	32%	—	22%	1,488	Sky Data	SMS	"Neither" excluded. Not weighted by 2016 vote.
14 Nov 2018	The UK Cabinet approves a new draft withdrawal agreement.									
24 Oct – 6 Nov 2018	—	48%	43%	—	9%	5%	8,154	Populus	Online	
28 Sep – 1 Oct 2018	I	51%	12%	28%	9%	23%	1,443	Sky Data	Online	
28 Sep – 1 Oct 2018	II	59%	—	41%	—	18%	1,443	Sky Data	Online	
10–11 Sep 2018	I	43%	15%	28%	14%	15%	1,070	Sky Data	Online	
10–11 Sep 2018	II	55%	—	45%	—	10%	1,070	Sky Data	Online	
17–20 Aug 2018	I	48%	12%	30%	10%	18%	1,330	Sky Data	Online	
17–20 Aug 2018	II	52%	—	37%	12%	15%	1,330	Sky Data	Online	
31 Jul – 7 Aug 2018	I	40%	11%	27%	22%	13%	10,121	YouGov	Online	
31 Jul – 7 Aug 2018	II	56%	—	44%	—	12%	10,121	YouGov	Online	
20–23 Jul 2018	I	48%	13%	27%	11%	21%	1,466	Sky Data	Online	
20–23 Jul 2018	II	59%	—	41%	—	18%	1,466	Sky Data	Online	
19–20 Jul 2018	I	41%	9%	31%	19%	10%	1,668	YouGov	Online	
19–20 Jul 2018	II	54%	—	46%	—	8%	1,668	YouGov	Online	
16–17 Jul 2018	I	42%	15%	28%	15%	14%	1,657	YouGov	Online	
16–17 Jul 2018	II	55%	—	45%	—	10%	1,657	YouGov	Online	
8–9 Jul 2018	Brexit Secretary David Davis and Foreign Secretary Boris Johnson resign.									
6 Jul 2018	The UK Cabinet agrees the Chequers statement, setting out a proposal on the future UK–EU relationship.									
23 Jun 2016	2016 United Kingdom European Union membership referendum									

=== Selective polling ===
Date(s) conducted	Round	Remain	Deal	No deal	None	Lead	Sample	Conducted by	Polling type	Notes
4 Nov 2019	—	29%	38%	18%	14%	9%	409	Survation	Telephone	Only in Gedling; (Note: Question was not asked in the context of a referendum.) (Note: Deal option is to leave with a withdrawal agreement, not necessarily the proposed one.)
23–26 Jul 2019	—	—	61%	39%	—	22%	1,071	YouGov	Online	Wales only.
16–20 May 2019	—	—	54%	46%	—	8%	1,009	YouGov	Online	Wales only.
7–10 May 2019	—	56%	23%	—	21%	33%	1,015	YouGov	Online	London only
7–10 May 2019	—	—	38%	21%	41%	17%	1,015	YouGov	Online	London only
6–11 Sep 2018	I	58%	10%	9%	23%	48%	1,645	YouGov	Online	18–24 age group
6–11 Sep 2018	II	82%	18%	—	—	64%	1,645	YouGov	Online	18–24 age group

== Four-option referendum ==
Some polls have offered respondents a choice between remaining in the EU, leaving the EU but remaining within the European Single Market or EU Customs Union (see notes), accepting the negotiated deal and leaving without a deal.

Date(s) conducted	Remain	Single Market	Deal	No deal	None	Lead	Sample	Conducted by	Polling type	Notes
15–19 Aug 2019	33%	13%	9%	23%	22%	10%	1,133	Kantar	Online	
30 Jun – 1 Jul 2019	38%	11%	12%	26%	13%	12%	1,668	YouGov	Online	
17–18 Jun 2019	43%	16%	13%	28%	—	15%	1,680	YouGov	Online	
28–29 May 2019	46%	13% (Note: or the Customs Union.)	9%	32%	—	14%	1,763	YouGov	Online	
22–26 Mar 2019	46%	14%	14%	27%	—	19%	5,412	YouGov	Online	

== Support for another referendum ==
There have been opinion polls to gauge support for a second referendum, on whether to accept or reject the final Brexit deal. Polling results vary depending on how the question is phrased: in general a "second referendum" is less popular than a "public vote" or similar descriptor. One YouGov poll conducted in April 2018 for Best for Britain showed much greater support for the public "[having] a final say on whether Britain accepts the deal or remains in the EU after all" than for "a public vote" on the same question.

Date(s) conducted	Support	Oppose	Neither	Lead	Sample	Conducted by	Polling type	Notes
17–18 Oct 2019	47%	44%	9%	3%	1,025	Survation	Online	
17–18 Oct 2019	43%	41%	16%	2%	1,025	Survation	Online	(Note: Question asked about a second EU referendum, not necessarily on the final deal.)
17 Oct 2019	EU and UK negotiators agree a new withdrawal agreement.							
2–14 Oct 2019	41%	45%	14%	4%	26,000	ComRes		Three-option referendum
29–30 Sep 2019	47%	29%	24%	18%	1,620	YouGov	Online	As opposed to a parliamentary vote, if a deal is negotiated.
29–30 Sep 2019	52%	23%	25%	29%	1,620	YouGov	Online	As opposed to a parliamentary vote, if no deal is negotiated.
5–9 Sep 2019	53%	29%	18%	24%	1,144	Kantar	Online	
5–7 Sep 2019	43%	42%	15%	1%	2,049	Deltapoll	Online	
3–4 Sep 2019	46%	41%	13%	5%	1,533	YouGov	Online	
29–31 Aug 2019	41%	47%	12%	6%	2,028	Deltapoll	Online	
15–19 Aug 2019	52%	29%	19%	23%	1,133	Kantar	Online	
25–27 Jul 2019	44%	44%	12%	0%	2,001	Deltapoll	Online	
24 Jul 2019	Boris Johnson replaces Theresa May as Prime Minister							
2–5 Jul 2019	41%	39%	19%	2%	1,532	BMG Research	Online	
23 May 2019	2019 European Parliament election in the United Kingdom							
9–13 May 2019	47%	28%	25%	19%	1,152	Kantar	Online	
4–8 Apr 2019	51%	32%	17%	19%	1,172	Kantar	Online	
2–5 Apr 2019	52%	24%	24%	28%	1,500	BMG Research	Online	
3 Apr 2019	35%	39%	25%	4%	1,068	Sky Data	Online	(Note: Referendum on whether to accept the negotiated terms or remain in the EU.)
1 Apr 2019	The House of Commons rejects a motion proposing a referendum on the withdrawal agreement in the second round of indicative votes.							
28–30 Mar 2019	40%	38%	22%	2%	1,010	Deltapoll	Online	
29 Mar 2019	The House of Commons votes to reject the Government's proposed withdrawal agreement for the third time.							
28–29 Mar 2019	42%	40%	19%	2%	2,008	Opinium	Online	On whether MPs should have voted for the relevant motion during the indicative votes
27 Mar 2019	The House of Commons rejects a motion proposing a referendum on the withdrawal agreement in the first round of indicative votes.							
27 Mar 2019	40%	35%	25%	4%	1,005	Sky Data	Online	On whether MPs should vote for the relevant motion during the indicative votes
19 Mar 2019	48%	36%	15%	12%	2,084	YouGov	Online	
14–15 Mar 2019	48%	36%	15%	12%	1,823	YouGov	Online	
14–15 Mar 2019	50%	36%	14%	14%	1,823	YouGov	Online	On whether to leave with no deal or remain in the EU, if the UK looks set to leave without a deal
14–15 Mar 2019	38%	52%	10%	14%	1,756	YouGov	Online	
14 Mar 2019	The House of Commons rejects an amendment which called for a referendum on the withdrawal agreement.							
12 Mar 2019	The House of Commons votes to reject the Government's proposed withdrawal agreement for the second time.							
4–5 Mar 2019	44%	56%	—	11%	2,042	ComRes	Online	No "Neither" option. Unusual wording.
21–23 Feb 2019	43%	45%	11%	2%	1,027	Deltapoll	Online	
18 Feb 2019	47%	35%	18%	12%	1,021	Survation	Online	
8–11 Feb 2019	41%	48%	11%	7%	2,004	Deltapoll	Online	
4–8 Feb 2019	50%	32%	17%	18%	1,503	BMG Research	Online	
18 Jan 2019	39%	48%	14%	9%	1,021	Sky Data	Online	
17 Jan 2019	30%	30%	40%	0%	1,792	Sky Data	Online	Three-option referendum
17 Jan 2019	35%	29%	36%	6%	1,792	Sky Data	Online	
17 Jan 2019	33%	31%	35%	2%	1,792	Sky Data	Online	(Note: Referendum on whether to accept the negotiated terms or leave the EU without a deal.)
17 Jan 2019	37%	30%	33%	7%	1,792	Sky Data	Online	(Note: Referendum on whether to remain in the EU or leave the EU without a deal.)
16–17 Jan 2019	38%	47%	15%	9%	2,031	ComRes	Online	
16 Jan 2019	47%	36%	16%	11%	1,070	YouGov	Online	
15 Jan 2019	The House of Commons votes to reject the Government's proposed withdrawal agreement for the first time.							
14–15 Jan 2019	35%	48%	17%	12%	2,010	ComRes	Online	
8–11 Jan 2019	46%	28%	26%	18%	1,514	BMG Research	Online	
7–8 Jan 2019	36%	49%	15%	13%	1,754	YouGov	Online	
21 Dec 2018 – 4 Jan 2019	41%	36%	22%	5%	25,537	YouGov	Online	
14–15 Dec 2018	44%	35%	21%	9%	1,660	YouGov	Online	Three-option referendum
14–15 Dec 2018	50%	27%	22%	23%	1,660	YouGov	Online	If Parliament cannot decide how to proceed
13–14 Dec 2018	43%	46%	12%	3%	2,022	Deltapoll	Online	
12–14 Dec 2018	44%	35%	20%	9%	5,043	YouGov	Online	
30 Nov-2 Dec 2018	40%	50%	11%	10%	2,035	ComRes	Online	
9–30 Nov 2018	Ministers including Brexit Secretary Dominic Raab and Work and Pensions Secretary Esther McVey resign in protest to the government's proposed withdrawal agreement (or to plans preceding it).							
28–29 Nov 2018	45%	36%	18%	9%	1,655	YouGov	Online	
23–26 Nov 2018	53%	39%	8%	14%	1,119	Sky Data	Online	Three-option referendum
15-16 Nov 2018	44%	30%	26%	14%	1,256	Populus	Online	
15 Nov 2018	55%	35%	10%	20%	1,488	Sky Data	SMS	Three-option referendum. Not weighted by 2016 vote.
15 Nov 2018	42%	38%	20%	4%	1,070	Survation	Online	
14–15 Nov 2018	48%	34%	17%	14%	1,153	YouGov	Online	
14–15 Nov 2018	47%	53%	—	6%	2,000	ComRes	Online	Only if there is no deal. Not weighted by 2016 vote. No "Neither" option.
14 Nov 2018	The UK Cabinet approves a new draft withdrawal agreement.							
7 Nov 2018	The Scottish Parliament commits to providing unequivocal support for a public vote on the final terms of the Brexit deal.							
24 Oct – 6 Nov 2018	65%	35%	—	30%	8,154	Populus	Online	No "Neither" option
20 Oct – 2 Nov 2018	43%	37%	20%	6%	20,086	Survation	Online	
20 Oct – 2 Nov 2018	38%	39%	23%	1%	20,086	Survation	Online	
20 Oct – 2 Nov 2018	39%	37%	24%	2%	20,086	Survation	Online	(Note: Referendum on whether to accept the negotiated terms or re-open negotiations with a view to getting a better deal.)
28 Sep – 1 Oct 2018	53%	40%	7%	13%	1,443	Sky Data	Online	Three-option referendum
25–26 Sep 2018	34%	50%	16%	16%	1,634	YouGov	Online	
25–26 Sep 2018	37%	48%	15%	11%	1,634	YouGov	Online	
21–22 Sep 2018	39%	43%	17%	4%	1,643	YouGov	Online	
18–19 Sep 2018	40%	43%	17%	3%	2,509	YouGov	Online	
10–11 Sep 2018	50%	39%	10%	11%	1,070	Sky Data	Online	Three-option referendum
4–5 Sep 2018	40%	41%	18%	1%	1,628	YouGov	Online	
31 Jul – 4 Sep 2018	45%	35%	21%	10%	25,641	YouGov	Online	
31 Aug – 1 Sep 2018	40%	43%	17%	3%	1,600	YouGov	Online	
31 Aug – 1 Sep 2018	45%	37%	18%	9%	1,017	Survation	Online	
17–20 Aug 2018	50%	42%	9%	8%	1,330	Sky Data	Online	Three-option referendum
31 Jul – 20 Aug 2018	45%	33%	22%	12%	18,772	YouGov	Online	
6–10 Aug 2018	48%	24%	27%	24%	1,481	BMG Research	Online	
26–31 Jul 2018	43%	41%	17%	2%	4,957	YouGov	Online	
25–26 Jul 2018	42%	40%	18%	2%	1,631	YouGov	Online	
24 Jul 2018	The Independent launches its campaign for a second referendum.							
20–23 Jul 2018	50%	40%	10%	9%	1,466	Sky Data	Online	Three-option referendum
16–17 Jul 2018	40%	42%	18%	2%	1,657	YouGov	Online	
16–17 Jul 2018	36%	47%	17%	11%	1,657	YouGov	Online	Three-option referendum
10–11 Jul 2018	37%	41%	23%	4%	1,732	YouGov	Online	
8–9 Jul 2018	Brexit Secretary David Davis and Foreign Secretary Boris Johnson resign.							
6 Jul 2018	The UK Cabinet agrees the Chequers statement, setting out a proposal on the future UK–EU relationship.							
3–5 Jul 2018	44%	27%	29%	17%	1,511	BMG Research	Online	
19–20 Jun 2018	37%	45%	18%	8%	1,663	YouGov	Online	
19–20 Jun 2018	48%	25%	27%	23%	1,022	Survation	Online	
13–14 May 2018	38%	46%	16%	8%	1,634	YouGov	Online	
12 May 2018	The National Union of Students calls for a referendum on the final deal.							
1–4 May 2018	53%	31%	16%	22%	2,005	Opinium		
15 Apr 2018	People's Vote campaign launched.							
10–12 Apr 2018	52%	31%	17%	21%	2,008	Opinium	Online	
9–10 Apr 2018	38%	45%	17%	7%	1,639	YouGov	Online	
6–8 Apr 2018	47%	36%	17%	11%	2,012	ICM	Online	
5–6 Apr 2018	39%	45%	17%	6%	823	YouGov	Online	
26–27 Mar 2018	36%	42%	22%	6%	1,659	YouGov	Online	
16–23 Mar 2018	41%	52%	7%	11%	1,616	Sky Data	Online	
5–6 Mar 2018	36%	43%	20%	7%	1,641	YouGov	Online	
2 Mar 2018	35%	54%	11%	19%	1,096	ComRes	Online	
2 Mar 2018	Theresa May makes Mansion House speech, outlining the UK Government's policy on the future UK–EU relationship.							
16–23 Mar 2018	41%	52%	7%	12%	1,616	Sky Data	Online	
14–16 Feb 2018	34%	54%	11%	20%	1,482	Sky Data	Online	
16–19 Jan 2018	35%	56%	9%	21%	1,096	Sky Data	Online	
10–19 Jan 2018	47%	34%	19%	13%	5,075	ICM	Online	
9–10 Jan 2018	36%	43%	21%	7%	1,714	YouGov	Online	
15 Dec 2017	The European Council decides to proceed to the second phase of the Brexit negotiations.							
10–11 Dec 2017	33%	42%	24%	9%	1,680	YouGov	Online	
30 Nov – 1 Dec 2017	50%	34%	16%	16%	1,003	Survation	Online	
23–24 Oct 2017	32%	46%	22%	14%	1,637	YouGov	Online	
22–24 Sep 2017	34%	46%	21%	12%	1,716	YouGov	Online	
22 Sep 2017	Theresa May makes Florence speech, in an attempt to 'unblock' the Brexit negotiations.							
12–13 Sep 2017	34%	47%	19%	13%	1,660	YouGov	Online	
14–15 Jul 2017	46%	39%	15%	7%	1,024	Survation	Online	
7–11 Jul 2017	41%	48%	12%	7%	2,005	Opinium		
28–30 Jun 2017	46%	47%	6%	1%	1,017	Survation	Telephone	
16–20 Jun 2017	38%	51%	11%	13%	2,005	Opinium		
19 Jun 2017	Brexit negotiations begin.							
16–17 Jun 2017	48%	43%	9%	5%	1,005	Survation	Telephone	
16–17 Jun 2017	38%	57%	4%	19%	1,005	Survation	Telephone	
10 Jun 2017	36%	55%	9%	18%	1,036	Survation	Online	
8 Jun 2017	2017 United Kingdom general election							
28 Apr – 2 May 2017	36%	53%	11%	17%	2,003	Opinium		
27–28 Apr 2017	31%	49%	20%	18%	1,612	YouGov	Online	
21–22 Apr 2017	39%	46%	14%	7%	2,072	Survation	Online	
20–21 Apr 2017	31%	48%	21%	17%	1,590	YouGov	Online	
29 Mar 2017	The United Kingdom invokes Article 50.							
17–21 Mar 2017	38%	52%	10%	14%	2,003	Opinium		
17 Jan 2017	Theresa May makes Lancaster House speech, setting out the UK Government's negotiating priorities.							
15–18 Dec 2016	35%	53%	13%	18%	2,048	ComRes		
13–16 Dec 2016	33%	52%	15%	19%	2,000	Opinium		
2 Oct 2016	Theresa May makes Conservative Party Conference speech, announcing her intention to invoke Article 50 by 31 March 2017.							
13 Jul 2016	Theresa May becomes Prime Minister of the United Kingdom.							
29–30 Jun 2016	32%	60%	7%	28%	1,017	BMG Research	Telephone	
27–28 Jun 2016	31%	58%	11%	27%	1,760	YouGov	Online	
23 Jun 2016	2016 United Kingdom European Union membership referendum							

=== Selective polling ===
Date(s) conducted	Support	Oppose	Neither	Lead	Sample	Conducted by	Polling type	Notes
23–26 Jul 2019	43%	46%	11%	3%	1,071	YouGov	Online	Wales only. (Note: Question asked about a second EU referendum, not necessarily on the final deal.)
20–23 Jun 2019	64%	33%	3%	31%	1,813	YouGov	Online	Members of trade unions
16–20 May 2019	40%	49%	12%	9%	1,009	YouGov	Online	Wales only.
26 Feb – 1 Mar 2019	65%	22%	13%	43%	5,004	YouGov	Online	Labour 2017 voters living in Northern England and the Midlands
15–22 Feb 2019	54%	19%	27%	35%	499	BMG Research	Online	Respondents of voting age only since 2016's referendum
15–22 Feb 2019	38%	25%	37%	13%	1,125	BMG Research	Online	Non-voters
30 Oct – 2 Nov 2018	41%	49%	10%	8%	1,031	YouGov	Online	Wales only.
3–6 Oct 2018	83%	10%	6%	73%	665	YouGov	Online	SNP members; unweighted
13–18 Sep 2018	86%	8%	6%	78%	1,054	YouGov	Online	Labour Party members
6–11 Sep 2018	52%	22%	25%	30%	1,645	YouGov	Online	18–24 age group
30 Aug – 5 Sep 2018	56%	33%	10%	23%	620	YouGov	Online	GMB members
30 Aug – 5 Sep 2018	66%	22%	11%	44%	1,081	YouGov	Online	UNISON members
30 Aug – 5 Sep 2018	59%	33%	8%	26%	1,058	YouGov	Online	Unite the Union members
31 Jul – 3 Sep 2018	52%	30%	19%	22%	3,051	YouGov	Online	London only
31 Jul – 19 Aug 2018	44%	36%	21%	8%	939	YouGov	Online	Wales only
28 Jun – 2 Jul 2018	40%	45%	15%	5%	1,031	YouGov	Online	Wales only.
27–30 Jun 2018	57%	34%	9%	23%	902	YouGov	Online	Unite the Union members
12–15 Mar 2018	39%	49%	12%	10%	1,015	YouGov	Online	Wales only.
21–24 Nov 2017	44%	43%	13%	1%	1,016	YouGov	Online	Wales only.
4–7 Sep 2017	40%	48%	12%	8%	1,011	YouGov	Online	Wales only.
29–31 May 2017	33%	56%	11%	23%	1,025	YouGov	Online	Wales only.
18–21 May 2017	37%	52%	11%	15%	1,025	YouGov	Online	Wales only.
5–7 May 2017	37%	53%	10%	16%	1,018	YouGov	Online	Wales only.
19–21 Apr 2017	35%	53%	12%	18%	1,029	YouGov	Online	Wales only.

== On the UK rejoining the EU ==
Some polls conducted prior to the UK's formal exit worded the question as whether to rejoin rather than stay in the EU.

Date(s) conducted	Join	Not join	Neither	Lead	Sample	Conducted by	Polling type
27 Mar 2019	38%	38%	25%	Tie	1,005	Sky Data	Online
27 Mar – 5 Apr 2018	31%	47%	22%	16%	1,037	Number Cruncher Politics	Online

== See also ==
- Opinion polling on the United Kingdom rejoining the European Union (2020–present)
- Opinion polling for the 2019 United Kingdom general election
- Opinion polling for the 2024 United Kingdom general election
- Opinion polling for the 2019 European Parliament election in the United Kingdom
