= 2016 in United Kingdom politics and government =

== Events ==
=== January ===
- 1 January – Newly declassified records released by the Scottish Government show the workings of the Scottish Executive's first full year of operation, covering major events throughout the year 2000; including First Minister Donald Dewar's death in office.
- 5 January – Prime Minister David Cameron tells Conservative Party ministers that they will be able to campaign on either side in the European Union membership referendum without leaving the Government.
- 6 January – Labour MPs Jonathan Reynolds and Stephen Doughty quit over the sacking of the shadow Europe minister Pat McFadden, after party leader Jeremy Corbyn reshuffles his shadow cabinet and makes controversial changes within his team.
- 9 January – Scotland's First Minister, Nicola Sturgeon, announces that every household, business or charity in the country directly affected by flood water will receive a grant of £1,500.
- 11 January
  - In the aftermath of Jeremy Corbyn's reshuffle of the Labour Party, Shadow Attorney General Catherine McKinnell resigns, citing party infighting, family reasons and the desire to speak in Parliament beyond her legal portfolio.
  - Arlene Foster becomes the first woman to lead the Democratic Unionist Party and becomes Northern Ireland's first female First Minister.
- 13 January – MPs have given initial support to the idea of England adopting an official national anthem.
- 19 January – The pro-Union Better Together organisation is fined £2,000 by Electoral Commission over referendum spending.

=== February ===
- 2 February – A proposal for a new arrangement of the relationship between the EU and the UK is published by the European Council.
- 3 February – In a statement to the House of Commons, David Cameron gives an update on the progression of the EU membership renegotiation.
- 9 February – The Welsh Assembly votes for legislation to protect the historic environment and make the maintenance of records mandatory; this makes Wales the first part of the UK, and one of the first countries in the world, to legislate for the protection of historic environment records.
- 19 February – The renegotiation package is signed by the UK and the rest of the EU.
- 20 February – David Cameron announces that Britain will hold a referendum on the United Kingdom's membership of the European Union on 23 June.
- 21 February – Mayor of London Boris Johnson announces he is to campaign for the UK to leave the European Union.
- 22 February – Cameron reveals that the EU membership referendum will take place on 23 June, a date he announces in the House of Commons.

=== March ===
- 16 March – Chancellor George Osborne announces the Budget for 2016 and the year ahead.
- 18 March – Iain Duncan Smith resigns as Secretary of State for Work and Pensions claiming that he came under pressure from the Treasury to "salami slice" welfare, and voicing his objection to £4bn of planned cuts to disability benefits announced in the Budget. Duncan Smith is succeeded in the post by Stephen Crabb.
- 19 March – Following the resignation of Iain Duncan Smith, Stephen Crabb is appointed as the new Secretary of State for Work and Pensions, while his position as Secretary of State for Wales is filled by Alun Cairns, MP for the Vale of Glamorgan.
- 31 March – Prime Minister David Cameron cuts short his spring break to return to the UK for an emergency meeting with ministers on the planned closure of the Tata Steel works.

=== April ===
- 6 April – The Government publishes a leaflet which sets out the case for remaining in the EU.
- 11 April – The Government's EU referendum leaflet begins being delivered to every household in the UK.
- 13 April –
  - Lady Dorian is appointed as Lord Justice Clerk in Scotland, succeeding Lord Carloway. She is the first woman to hold the post.
  - The Government's EU referendum leaflet reaches every household in the country.
- 15 April – The European Union membership referendum campaign gets underway in the UK as both sides prepare to persuade voters to decide whether they want to leave or remain in the EU when the referendum takes place in June.
- 16 April – Thousands of people take part in a protest against austerity cuts in central London, including the Shadow Chancellor, John McDonnell.

=== May ===
- 5 May –
  - UK local and Police and crime commissioner elections, as well as elections to the Northern Ireland Assembly, Welsh Assembly and Scottish Parliament are held.
  - Elections to the Scottish Parliament are held. The Scottish National Party win the election and a third term in government, but fall two seats short of securing an overall majority, whilst the Scottish Conservatives replace Scottish Labour as the main opposition party, with Scottish Conservative leader, Ruth Davidson becoming the Leader of the Opposition.
  - 2016 National Assembly for Wales election. New constituency members elected include Hannah Blythyn (Labour), Siân Gwenllian (Plaid Cymru), Huw Irranca-Davies (Labour) and Lee Waters (Labour). New regional members include UKIP members Neil Hamilton and Mark Reckless. Plaid Cymru leader Leanne Wood takes the Rhondda seat from Labour's Leighton Andrews.
  - 2016 Northern Ireland Assembly election takes place.
  - Two House of Commons by-elections take place where Labour hold the seats of Ogmore and Sheffield Brightside and Hillsborough.
- 7 May – Sadiq Khan is sworn in as mayor of London, succeeding Boris Johnson and becoming London's first Muslim mayor.
- 17 May – John Beckett QC is installed as a Senator of the College of Justice, with the judicial title Lord Beckett.
- 18 May
  - The UK government's planned new laws are set out by the Queen in her annual speech, which include a large overhaul on prison laws and support for a spaceport and driverless cars.
  - Welsh Labour leader Carwyn Jones is re-elected as First Minister of Wales after his party forms a minority government with support from Plaid Cymru.
  - Neil Hamilton, leader of the UKIP contingent in the National Assembly for Wales, is widely criticised for using sexist language in his maiden speech.
- 24 May – Alistair Clark QC is installed as a Senator of the College of Justice, with the judicial title Lord Clark.
- 31 May – Andrew Stewart is installed as a Senator of the College of Justice, with the judicial title Lord Ericht.

=== June ===
- 9 June – A call by MP Chris Bryant for the ban on speaking Welsh at Westminster to be overturned, is rejected by the House of Commons leader Chris Grayling.
- 16 June – Labour MP Jo Cox, the Member of Parliament for Batley and Spen, dies at Leeds General Infirmary after being shot and stabbed as she prepared to hold a meeting with constituents in Birstall, West Yorkshire.
- 20 June – The Judicial Committee of the Privy Council rules that Murray Pringle, an accountant from High Wycombe in Buckinghamshire, England, is the legitimate heir to the baronetcy of Pringle of Stichill, in the Scottish Borders, which was dormant after the death of the 10th Baronet in 2013.
- 21 June – Both sides of the referendum on the UK's membership of the European Union take part in the biggest live debate at Wembley Arena on a special edition of Question Time on the BBC. Panelists include former Mayor of London Boris Johnson, for Leave, and his successor Sadiq Khan for Remain.
- 23 June – European Union membership referendum
- 24 June
  - The United Kingdom votes to leave the European Union in a vote of 51.9% to 48.1%, in a record voting turnout of 72%. England and Wales vote for leave, while London, Scotland, Northern Ireland and Gibraltar back remain.
  - David Cameron resigns as leader of the Conservative Party, announcing he is to step down as Prime Minister by October, claiming "fresh leadership" is needed in the wake of a vote to leave. The 2016 Conservative Party leadership election is launched to find his successor.
- 26 June
  - Several Labour Party shadow cabinet ministers quit, with many more expected, in protest at Jeremy Corbyn's leadership and "lacklustre" referendum campaign. Corbyn issues a statement in response, vowing to stand in any new leadership election and to reshape his shadow cabinet.
  - First Minister of Scotland Nicola Sturgeon warns she could persuade the Scottish Parliament to veto the United Kingdom's exit from the European Union.
- 27 June –
  - Cameron addresses the House of Commons over the referendum result.
  - Chancellor of the Exchequer George Osborne makes a statement to calm the markets in the aftermath of the referendum, claiming the UK is ready to face the future "from a position of strength" and indicating there won't be an immediate emergency Budget.
- 28 June
  - A Motion of no confidence by Labour MPs in leader Jeremy Corbyn is passed by a 172 to 40 vote. However, Corbyn reiterates that he will not resign.
  - Stephen Crabb becomes the first MP to announce their candidacy in the 2016 Conservative Party leadership election.
- 30 June – Michael Gove, Theresa May, Andrea Leadsom and Liam Fox announce their candidacies for leadership of the Conservative Party and subsequently Prime Minister. Boris Johnson, a front runner for the job according to political analysts, surprisingly declares his intentions not to campaign.

=== July ===
- 4 July – UK Independence Party leader Nigel Farage resigns, saying his "political ambition had been achieved" with the UK voting to leave the European Union.
- 5 July – Voting in the Conservative Party leadership election commences. Theresa May gains the most votes in the first round - 165 - while her rivals Andrea Leadsom and Michael Gove receive 66 and 48 votes respectively.
- 6 July – The Chilcot Inquiry report into the Iraq War is released, more than seven years after the inquiry was first announced, showing that the UK went to war before peaceful options were exhausted, that military action was not the "last resort", ill-prepared troops were sent into battle with inadequate plans for the aftermath, and that the threat from Saddam Hussein was overstated; ultimately rejecting former Prime Minister Tony Blair's case for the 2003 invasion.
- 10 July – Angela Eagle announces she will challenge Jeremy Corbyn for leadership of the Labour Party, triggering a leadership election.
- 11 July – Theresa May is announced as the Conservative Party leader, and Prime Minister-designate, after Andrea Leadsom withdraws from the leadership election.
- 13 July
  - David Cameron officially tenders his resignation as Prime Minister to the Queen, and is succeeded by his former Home Secretary Theresa May.
  - Theresa May begins to announce her cabinet, with Philip Hammond as the new Chancellor of the Exchequer, Amber Rudd as Home Secretary, Boris Johnson as Foreign Secretary, and David Davis appointed in the new Exiting the European Union Secretary post.
  - Owen Smith announces he will also contest the 2016 Labour Party leadership election.
- 14 July – Following Theresa May's selection as the Prime Minister of the United Kingdom, Welsh Secretary Alun Cairns is one of only four ministers to retain their positions in the newly announced Cabinet.
- 18 July – MPs vote to back the renewal of the UK's Trident nuclear weapons programme, in a vote of 472 to 117.
- 19 July – Angela Eagle withdraws from the 2016 Labour Party leadership election, leaving Owen Smith to challenge Jeremy Corbyn for the leadership in a head-to-head race.
- 24 July – A cross-party movement, More United, is formed to support political candidates regardless of party affiliation.
- 27 July – The European Commission name Michel Barnier as their chief negotiator for the UK's withdrawal from the EU.

=== August ===
- 4 August – Former Prime Minister David Cameron's resignation honours lists are published.

=== September ===
- 8 September – Theresa May and the President of the European Council, Donald Tusk, hold their first formal bilateral meeting to discuss Brexit.
- 12 September – Former Prime Minister David Cameron resigns from the House of Commons, triggering the 2016 Witney by-election.
- 13 September
  - The Wales Bill 2016, which gives new powers and accountability for the Welsh Assembly, is passed by MPs in the House of Commons.
  - A new Boundary Commission plan which would see Welsh Members of Parliament cut from 40 to 29, is published for consultation.
- 15 September – The UK government approves the Hinkley Point C nuclear power plant, which will cost £18bn, and says it will introduce "new safeguards" to future projects.
- 16 September – Diane James is elected the new leader of UKIP.
- 24 September – Jeremy Corbyn is re-elected as leader of the Labour Party following an unsuccessful challenge by Owen Smith.

=== October ===
- 2 October – In her party conference speech at the ICC Birmingham, Theresa May confirms that Article 50 will be triggered before the end of March 2017.
- 5 October – Diane James quits as leader of UKIP after only 18 days in the post.
- 6 October – Communities Secretary Sajid Javid approves plans for fracking at Cuadrilla's Preston New Road site in Lancashire, overturning an earlier decision by the local council.
- 20 October – The Batley and Spen by-election is held following the murder of Jo Cox, and sees former Coronation Street actress Tracy Brabin retain the seat for Labour.
- 25 October – The UK government approves a third runway at Heathrow Airport. Zac Goldsmith MP for Richmond Park resigns in protest.

=== November ===
- 3 November – In R (Miller) v Secretary of State for Exiting the European Union, the High Court delivers its judgement in favour of the claimants. The government responds by saying it will appeal the decision.
- 20 November – Steve Baker becomes chair of the European Research Group.
- 23 November – Chancellor Philip Hammond delivers the Autumn Statement to Parliament, announced to be the final such Statement, being replaced by a full Budget in 2017.
- 28 November – Paul Nuttall is elected as UKIP's new leader.
- 29 November –The Investigatory Powers Bill receives Royal assent.

=== December ===
- 7 December – The House of Commons overwhelmingly decides to respect the outcome of the EU referendum in a vote.
- 15 December – Frank Mulholland appointed as a Senator of the College of Justice as Lord Mulholland, replacing Lord Stewart.

== Deaths ==
- 13 January – Sir Albert McQuarrie, 98, Scottish politician, MP for East Aberdeenshire (1979–1983) and Banff and Buchan (1983–1987).
- 20 January – Brian Key, 68, politician, MEP for Yorkshire South (1979–1984).
- 22 January – Cecil Parkinson, Lord Parkinson, 84, Conservative politician and cabinet minister, Secretary of State for Trade and Industry (1983), Energy (1987–1989), and Transport (1989–1990), and Chairman of the Conservative Party (1997–1998).
- 29 January – John Roper, Baron Roper, 80, politician.
- 4 February – Harry Harpham, 61, politician, MP for Sheffield Brightside and Hillsborough (since 2015).
- 14 February – Eric Lubbock, 4th Baron Avebury, 87, politician, MP for Orpington (1962–1970).
- 18 February
  - Sir Tony Durant, 88, politician, MP (1974–1997).
  - Don Rossiter, 80, footballer and politician.
- 4 March – John Brooks, Baron Brooks of Tremorfa, 88, politician and boxing executive, President of the British Boxing Board of Control and Welsh Sports Hall of Fame.
- 5 March – John Evans, Baron Evans of Parkside, 85, politician, MP for Newton (1974–1983) and St Helens North (1983–1997).
- 1 April – Tony Whittaker, 81, solicitor and politician.
- 8 April – Mildred Gordon, 92, politician, MP for Bow and Poplar (1987–1997).
- 23 April – Maurice Peston, Baron Peston, 85, peer, politician and economist.
- 16 May – David Rendel, 67, politician, MP for Newbury (1993–2005).
- 28 May – Edward O'Hara, 78, politician, MP for Knowsley South (1990–2010).
- 12 June – Rodney Leach, Baron Leach of Fairford, 82, banker and politician.
- 16 June – Jo Cox, 41, politician, MP for Batley and Spen (since 2015), assassinated.
- 25 June – Patrick Mayhew, Baron Mayhew of Twysden, 86, barrister and politician, Secretary of State for Northern Ireland (1992–1997).
- 5 July
  - David Jones, 66, politician, member of the States of Guernsey.
  - Brian White, 59, politician, MP for North East Milton Keynes (1997–2005).
- 6 July – Matthew Evans, Baron Evans of Temple Guiting, 74, politician and publisher (Faber).
- 5 August – Sir Robin Chichester-Clark, 88, politician, MP for Londonderry (1955–1974).
- 19 August – Danus Skene, 72, politician.
- 26 August – Martyn Quayle, 57, politician, member of the House of Keys (2001–2011).
- 28 August – Ken Purchase, 77, politician, MP for Wolverhampton North East (1992–2010).
- 8 September
  - Sir Trevor Jones, 89, politician.
  - John Watts, 69, politician, MP for Slough (1983–1997).
- 27 September – Ronald King Murray, Lord Murray, 94, politician and jurist, Lord Advocate (1974–1979).
- 9 October – Sir Anthony Grant, 91, politician, MP for Harrow Central (1964–1983), and Cambridgeshire South West (1983–1997).
- 10 October – Drew Nelson, 60, solicitor, politician, and Grand Secretary of the Grand Orange Lodge of Ireland.
- 18 October – William McKelvey, 82, politician, MP for Kilmarnock and Loudoun (1983–1997).
- 21 October – Raine Spencer, Countess Spencer, 87, socialite and politician.
- 25 November – Thomas Taylor, Baron Taylor of Blackburn, 87, Labour politician.
- 3 December – Arthur Latham, 86, politician, MP for Paddington North (1969–1974) and Paddington (1974–1979), Leader of the London Borough of Havering (1990–1996).
- 7 December
  - Alex Johnstone, 55, politician, MSP for North East Scotland (since 1999).
  - Allan Stewart, 74, politician, MP for East Renfrewshire (1979–1983), and Eastwood (1983–1997).
- 12 December – Jim Prior, Baron Prior, 89, politician, Secretary of State for Northern Ireland (1981–1984) and Employment (1979–1981).
- 14 December – Sir Dudley Smith, 90, politician, MP for Brentford and Chiswick (1959–1966) and Warwick and Leamington (1968–1997).
- 20 December – Patrick Jenkin, Baron Jenkin of Roding, 90, politician, Secretary of State for Social Services (1979–1981), Industry (1981–1983), and Environment (1983–1985).
- 23 December – George Thompson, 88, politician, MP for Galloway (1974–1979).

== See also ==
- 2016 in the United Kingdom
