= Vi coactus =

Latin term

Vi coactus (V.C.) is a Latin term meaning 'having been forced' or 'having been compelled'. In Latin, cōgō means 'I compel' or 'I force'. The passive participle of cōgō is coāctus, meaning 'having been forced' or 'having been compelled' or 'coerced'.

"Vi coactus" or "V.C." is used with a signature to indicate that the signer was under duress. The signer uses such marking to signal that the agreement was made under duress, and that it is their belief that it invalidates their signature.

== Examples of usage ==
Cornelis de Witt, a Dutch 17th-century statesman, was forced to sign the act for the restoration of the stadtholderate. After entreaties by his wife, he signed the contract but added "V.C." to his signature.

After being elected as leader of the UK Independence Party in September 2016, Diane James added "Vi coactus" after her signature on the official document informing the Electoral Commission of her election, which the commission said they could not accept as a result. She subsequently relinquished the leadership role 24 hours later, 18 days after winning the election to replace Nigel Farage.

=== In literature ===
In the early chapters of his historical novel The Black Tulip, Alexandre Dumas describes the use of "V.C." by Cornelis de Witt, along with the role and meaning of the two letters.

A description of "V.C." in The Black Tulip:

This young man was, in 1672, twenty-two years of age. John de Witt, who was his tutor, had brought him up with the view of making him a good citizen. Loving his country better than he did his disciple, the master had, by the Perpetual Edict, extinguished the hope which the young Prince might have entertained of one day becoming Stadtholder. But God laughs at the presumption of man, who wants to raise and prostrate the powers on earth without consulting the King above; and the fickleness and caprice of the Dutch combined with the terror inspired by Louis XIV., in repealing the Perpetual Edict, and re-establishing the office of Stadtholder in favour of William of Orange, for whom the hand of Providence had traced out ulterior destinies on the hidden map of the future.

The Grand Pensionary bowed before the will of his fellow citizens; Cornelius de Witt, however, was more obstinate, and notwithstanding all the threats of death from the Orangist rabble, who besieged him in his house at Dort, he stoutly refused to sign the act by which the office of Stadtholder was restored. Moved by the tears and entreaties of his wife, he at last complied, only adding to his signature the two letters V. C. (Vi Coactus), notifying thereby that he only yielded to force.

=== In US federal court ===
In Merrick v. Warden, the United States District Court for the Southern District of Ohio, Merrick claimed his "guilty plea was involuntary because at the time he entered into it, he signaled that he was acting under duress by putting the initials “V.C.” before his signature on the Memorandum of Understanding which embodies the plea agreement in the case." The court reasoned that since Merrick failed to cite "a single case in which a court has held that signing with “V.C.” actually relieves a person of the obligation to perform under a contract..." that signing V.C. in front of Merrick’s signature had no "legal significance."

== See also ==
- Undue influence in English law
- Duress in English law
- Duress in American law
