= October–November 2016 UK Independence Party leadership election =

United Kingdom independence party (UKIP) leadership election

November 2016 UK Independence Party leadership election
- 28 November 2016
- Turnout: 46.9% (▼7.6%)
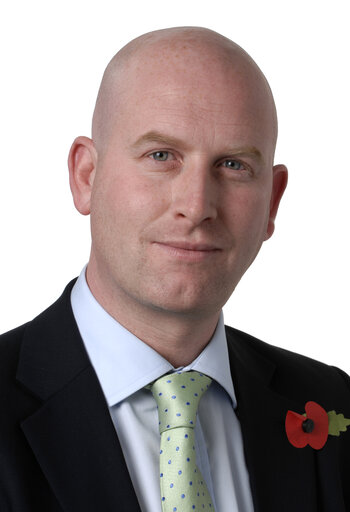

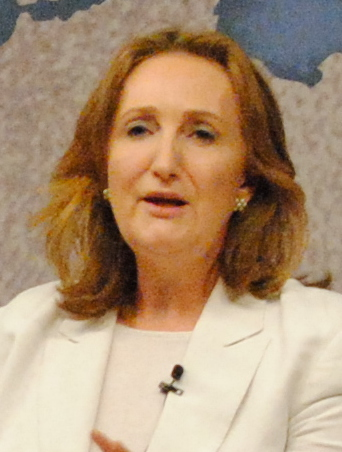

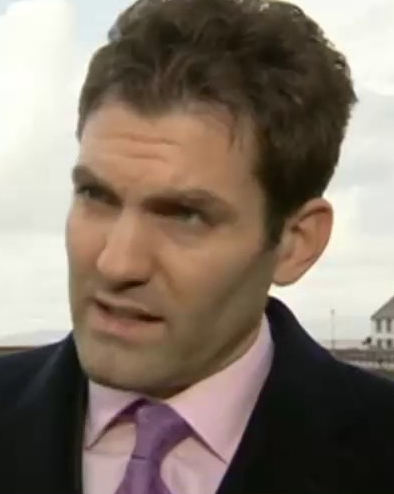
Candidate	Paul Nuttall	Suzanne Evans	John Rees-Evans
Running mate	Peter Whittle	–	–
Percentage	62.6%	19.3%	18.1%
Popular vote	9,622	2,973	2,775
Leader before election
Nigel Farage (interim); previously Diane James (leader-elect) (Note: Diane James never took office and Farage legally remained party leader.)
Elected Leader
Paul Nuttall

The November 2016 UK Independence Party leadership election took place following the announcement on 4 October 2016 by Diane James, the leader-elect of the UK Independence Party, that she would not accept the leadership of the party, despite winning the leadership election 18 days earlier. Nigel Farage, whom James was to succeed after the previous leadership election following his resignation, was selected the next day to serve as interim leader.

On 28 November 2016, former deputy leader Paul Nuttall was announced as the new leader of the UK Independence Party with 63% of the vote.

== Background ==
The party was seen as having two major factions. On one side were those who backed Nigel Farage; in the previous leadership contest these had favoured Steven Woolfe, and then, when he was not nominated, Diane James. On the other were those who wanted a more collegiate party, including figures like Suzanne Evans, the party's only MP Douglas Carswell and its former director of communications Patrick O'Flynn; this group had supported Lisa Duffy in the previous election.

Woolfe was seen by many as the favourite in the election. He admitted he had considered defecting to the Conservative Party following the previous leadership election; an argument concerning this with his MEP colleagues at a meeting in the European Parliament resulted in an altercation with Mike Hookem, after which Woolfe collapsed and had to be hospitalised. He claimed Hookem had punched him, an accusation denied by Hookem. A few days later, on 17 October 2016, Woolfe withdrew his candidacy and quit UKIP, describing the party as ungovernable without Farage as leader.

The party's National Executive Committee was expected to meet on 10 October 2016 to set a date and rules for the leadership election, but later rescheduled the meeting to 17 October. While party chairman Paul Oakden initially mooted that the election could be delayed until 2017, the NEC opened nominations on 17 October, to close at midday on 31 October. Hustings were expected in early November, and ballots were to be sent out on 11 November. The result was to be announced on 28 November.

== Campaign ==
On 7 October, Woolfe and Raheem Kassam announced their intent to run for the leadership. Woolfe was seen as favourite to succeed Diane James, following his failure to submit his nomination in time for the previous leadership election. Woolfe's campaign message was that UKIP had to "stand up for the ignored working class and secure a radically different political landscape in Britain". On 6 October, Woolfe had been hospitalised following an altercation with fellow MEP Mike Hookem at the European Parliament. On 17 October, Woolfe withdrew from the contest and left UKIP, claiming the party was in a "death spiral". Party chairman Paul Oakden stated this was "regrettable", and former party leader Nigel Farage said it was "unfortunate".

Kassam, who given Woolfe's withdrawal was expected to be the first ethnic minority candidate for the UKIP leadership, stated that he was the person to end "corruption" at the top of the party and heal the party divides. He sought to address cultural and social divisions across the country by eliminating Islamism in schools, prisons, and neighbourhoods. He was criticised by The Huffington Post for his past comments on social media; for example, when he told people with whom he had disagreed on Twitter to "fuck off". Moreover, the language used to describe the transgender community caused disputes both internally and externally. He openly referred to himself as "Islamophobe of the Year" in 2014, and advertised 'Brits for Trump' shirts that he said he had made in response to requests. Promoting himself as a "straight-talking" candidate, some of his tweets and social presence had been strongly condemned, including a derogatory comment following Scottish First Minister Nicola Sturgeon's miscarriage in 2014. Rival candidate Suzanne Evans criticised him as "far right", whilst Nigel Farage responded, calling her "poisonous". As the self-described "Farage-ist" candidate, his ideas on the party's future included introducing the position of party CEO so the party can be "run like an organisation". Kassam's key message had been to prevent UKIP moving to the "squishy centre ground".

On 12 October, the leader of UKIP in the London Assembly, Peter Whittle, announced his candidacy, promising, if elected, to ensure Brexit is delivered. He further pledged that if UKIP under his leadership were to form a government, a priority would be ensuring national pride across the UK. Whittle proposed schools fly the Union Jack, a statement that angered some groups.

John Rees-Evans, a former British Army soldier, declared his candidacy on 17 October. He pledged to ensure that the UK left the EU, and said the government ought to be reduced in size and function. He stated his belief that the current "political class" in Westminster was detached from citizens, and pledged to make politics more transparent and open if elected UKIP leader. Rees-Evans caused controversy in 2014 when he claimed that a "gay donkey tried to rape my horse". He later clarified his comments as "playful banter with a mischievous activist" and apologised.

A few days later, on 18 October, fellow AM David Kurten announced his intention to stand. His policies include protecting the green belt, banning Sharia law, scrapping HS2, Crossrail 2 and a third runway at Heathrow, introducing proportional representation for general elections in the UK, and making the House of Lords a fully elected, smaller second chamber.

Two significant UKIP politicians, Paul Nuttall (former deputy leader) and Suzanne Evans (former deputy chair of UKIP and director of policy for the party, before being expelled following the 2015 general election) entered the contest on 23 October. Nuttall described himself as the "unity candidate" for the party, able to "bring the factions together." Nuttall's message was that UKIP could become the patriotic face of the working class, something shared by Kassam and Whittle. He said that UKIP could fill the "political gap vacated by what's left of the Labour party" under Jeremy Corbyn, who had "abandon[ed] his principles" over the EU, and promised to hold the government accountable over immigration. His key campaign message was to unify the party and to make the party the true "voice of the common man and woman".

Evans' message was party "detoxification". She is a member of the party faction that favours more centrist conservative views; her priorities for leadership included ensuring that the 1972 European Communities Act is repealed by the UK government, ensuring that UKIP led the electoral reform process, and bolstering the current Conservative government's stance on law and order. Evans caused some disruption with her pledge to end the "Trump-styled rhetoric" in the party. This was seen by some, including former party leader Nigel Farage, as an indirect swipe at Raheem Kassam's campaign (whose logo was 'Make UKIP Great Again' similar to the 'Make America Great Again' of Donald Trump's 2016 presidential campaign). Evans has previously stated that she wished to see the UK's defence budget increased, foreign aid budget and energy bills reduced and corporate tax avoiders held accountable for their actions.

Evans appeared on ITV's The Agenda on 26 October, where she was criticised by fellow panellist Jeremy Paxman over whether she had "compassion" regarding child refugees in Calais. She replied "of course I have compassion, but this system is being abused here, it's quite obvious" in reference to some refugees, who have claimed to be children but who are believed by some to be grown adults.

Two candidates formally withdrew from the contest: Andrew Beadle on 13 October and Bill Etheridge (who had come third in the previous leadership election) on 26 October. Both argued that Paul Nuttall would be the most suitable candidate for leader, able to unify the party and help it move onto more "fertile ground." On 30 October, David Kurten withdrew from the race; praising his fellow candidates, he stated that he would be "happy to work with any of the remaining candidates... on ensuring Brexit is delivered."

A 25 October survey of 91 UKIP councillors for The Times found 42% supported Nuttall and 22% Evans. Others receiving support were Raheem Kassam (9%), Douglas Carswell and Lisa Duffy (5% each), Patrick O'Flynn (4%), Bill Etheridge (2%) and Peter Whittle (1%). 8% said none of the above.

Kassam withdrew from the contest, endorsing Peter Whittle, on 31 October.

== Candidates ==
=== Declared ===
- Suzanne Evans, Co-Deputy Chair of UKIP (2014–2016), candidate for Shrewsbury and Atcham in the 2015 general election
- Paul Nuttall, Leader of UKIP in the European Parliament; former Deputy Leader of UKIP (2010–2016); MEP for North West England, candidate for Bootle in 2015
- John Rees-Evans, candidate for Cardiff South and Penarth in 2015

=== Withdrawn ===
- Andrew Beadle, candidate for Bermondsey and Old Southwark in 2015 and UKIP Sutton Deputy Chair (endorsed Paul Nuttall)
- Bill Etheridge, candidate for Leader in September 2016; MEP for the West Midlands; councillor for Sedgley Ward on Dudley Metropolitan Borough Council (endorsed Paul Nuttall)
- Raheem Kassam, Editor of Breitbart London; former senior adviser to Nigel Farage (endorsed Peter Whittle)
- David Kurten, London-wide Member of the London Assembly
- Steven Woolfe, former UKIP Migration Spokesman; MEP for North West England (initially declared but later resigned from UKIP on 17 October 2016, the day that nominations opened)
- Peter Whittle, Leader of UKIP in the London Assembly and London-wide Member of the London Assembly, UKIP candidate for Eltham in 2015 (endorsed Paul Nuttall)

=== Declined ===
- Elizabeth Jones, deputy chairman of UKIP Lewisham
- Douglas Carswell, MP for Clacton
- David Coburn, Leader of UKIP in Scotland and MEP for Scotland (endorsed Paul Nuttall)
- Lisa Duffy, candidate for Leader in September 2016; Town and District Councillor for Ramsey; Chief of Staff for Patrick O'Flynn (endorsed Suzanne Evans)
- Nigel Farage, interim Leader of UKIP; former Leader of UKIP (2006–2009; 2010–2016); MEP for South East England
- Neil Hamilton, Leader of UKIP in the National Assembly for Wales; Member of the National Assembly for Wales (AM) for Mid and West Wales; Co-Deputy Chair of UKIP (2014–2016) (endorsed Paul Nuttall)
- Chris Wells, Leader of Thanet District Council and Thanet District Councillor for Cliftonville East Ward (endorsed Paul Nuttall)

== Endorsements ==
=== Suzanne Evans: 'Stronger with Suzanne.' ===
- Lisa Duffy, candidate for Leader in September 2016; Town and District Councillor for Ramsey; Chief of Staff for Patrick O'Flynn

=== Paul Nuttall: 'United with Paul.' ===
==== Former party leaders ====
- Malcolm Pearson, former Leader of UKIP (2009–2010) and Leader of UKIP in the House of Lords
- Jeffrey Titford, former leader of UKIP (2000-2002, 2010) and honorary party president.

==== MEPs ====
- Stuart Agnew, MEP for the East of England
- Tim Aker, MEP for the East of England
- Jonathan Arnott, MEP for North East England; UKIP NEC Member
- James Carver, MEP for the West Midlands
- David Coburn, Leader of UKIP in Scotland and MEP for Scotland
- Jane Collins, MEP for Yorkshire and the Humber
- Bill Etheridge, candidate for Leader in September 2016 and withdrawn candidate for Leader in November 2016; MEP for the West Midlands; Dudley Borough Councillor for Sedgley Ward
- Ray Finch, MEP for South East England
- Roger Helmer, MEP for the East Midlands
- Mike Hookem, MEP for Yorkshire and the Humber
- Julia Reid, MEP for South West England
- William Dartmouth, UKIP Deputy Chairman, MEP for South West England

==== Welsh AMs ====
- Neil Hamilton, Leader of UKIP in the Welsh Assembly; Member of the Welsh Assembly for Mid and West Wales; Co-Deputy Chair of UKIP (2014–2016)
- Caroline Jones, Member of the Welsh Assembly for South Wales West Region

==== Other people ====
- Andrew Beadle, withdrawn candidate for Leader; UKIP candidate for Bermondsey and Old Southwark in 2015; UKIP Sutton Deputy Chair
- Godfrey Bloom, former UKIP, then independent MEP for Yorkshire and the Humber
- Phillip Broughton, candidate for Leader in September 2016 and UKIP candidate for Hartlepool in 2015
- David McNarry, Leader of UKIP Northern Ireland, former MLA for the Northern Irish Assembly constituency of Strangford
- Cllr. Lawrence Webb, UKIP Group Leader on the Havering Council, former deputy leader candidate (stood with Elizabeth Jones)
- John Whittaker, former MEP for North West England and UKIP chairman (2006-2008)
- Peter Whittle, withdrawn candidate for leader, Leader of UKIP in the London Assembly and London-wide Member of the London Assembly, UKIP candidate for Eltham

==== UKIP councillors (by council) ====
- Thanet District Council
- Thurrock Council
- Wyre Forest District Council

=== John Rees-Evans: 'Powered by the People' ===
- Tyson Fury, professional boxer

== Previous endorsements ==
=== Steven Woolfe ===
MEPs

- Nigel Farage, interim Leader of UKIP; former Leader of UKIP (2006–2009; 2010–2016); MEP for South East England Farage, saying he had not intended to endorse any of the candidates, said he would not be voting for Evans in response.

Other people

- Arron Banks, businessman; co-founder of the Leave.EU campaign; prominent UKIP donor

=== Raheem Kassam: 'Make UKIP Great Again.' ===
- Arron Banks, businessman; co-founder of the Leave.EU campaign; prominent UKIP donor (previously endorsed Steven Woolfe)

=== Peter Whittle: 'Win with Whittle.' ===
- Raheem Kassam, withdrawn candidate for Leader, Editor of Breitbart London, former senior advisor to Nigel Farage.

== Timeline ==
- 4 October: Diane James stands down as leader, triggering a new contest
- 7 October: Steven Woolfe and Raheem Kassam both announce their candidacies
- 12 October: Peter Whittle announces his candidacy
- 18 October: David Kurten announces his candidacy
- 20 October: Andrew Beadle announces his candidacy
- 23 October: Paul Nuttall and Suzanne Evans both announce their candidacies
- 24 October: Bill Etheridge withdraws his candidacy and endorses Nuttall
- 25 October: Andrew Beadle withdraws his candidacy and endorses Nuttall
- 30 October: David Kurten withdraws his candidacy
- 31 October: Raheem Kassam withdraws his candidacy and endorses Whittle
- 4 November: Peter Whittle withdraws his candidacy and endorses Nuttall

== Opinion polling ==
Some of the polls below include people who will not be candidates. Polls show both free choices among all candidates and constrained choices among particular pairs of candidates.

Poll source	Date(s) administered	Sample size	Jonathan; Arnott	Phillip; Broughton	Douglas; Carswell	Lisa; Duffy	Bill; Etheridge	Suzanne; Evans	Nigel; Farage	Nathan; Gill	Neil; Hamilton	Elizabeth; Jones	Raheem; Kassam	Paul Nuttall	Peter Whittle	Steven; Woolfe	Other/ Undecided
The Times, Red Box surveys	25 October 2016	91 UKIP councillors	–	–	5%	5%	2%	22%	–	–	–	0%	9%	42%	1%	–	None of the above 8% Patrick O'Flynn 4% David Kurten, Andrew Beadle, John Rees-Evans 0%
	17 October 2016	Nominations open, Steven Woolfe resigns from UKIP.															
YouGov	5–14 October 2016	1,003 UKIP members (Note: Eligible members of UKIP.)	2%	1%	3%	4%	2%	7%	31%	1%	1%	2%	–	–	–	37%	Don't know 8% None of the above 3%
YouGov	5–14 October 2016	1,003 UKIP members	2%	1%	5%	5%	3%	10%	–	2%	2%	2%	–	–	–	47%	Don't know 16% None of the above 4%

== Results ==
Paul Nuttall was elected Leader with 62.6% of the vote.

32,757 ballot papers were issued and 15,370 members voted in the contest, a turnout of 47%. This was a drop in turnout from the September leadership election, which saw 17,842 members cast a ballot, a turnout of approximately 54%.

UK Independence Party leadership election, November 2016
Candidate	Votes		%
✓ Paul Nuttall	9,622		62.6%
Suzanne Evans	2,973		19.3%
John Rees-Evans	2,775		18.1%
Turnout		15,370	46.9%
Paul Nuttall elected as leader ✓

== See also ==
- 2016 Conservative Party leadership election
- 2016 Green Party of England and Wales leadership election
- 2016 Labour Party leadership election (UK)
- July–September 2016 UK Independence Party leadership election
- List of UK Independence Party leaders
