= Steven Woolfe =

British Independent politician (born 1967)

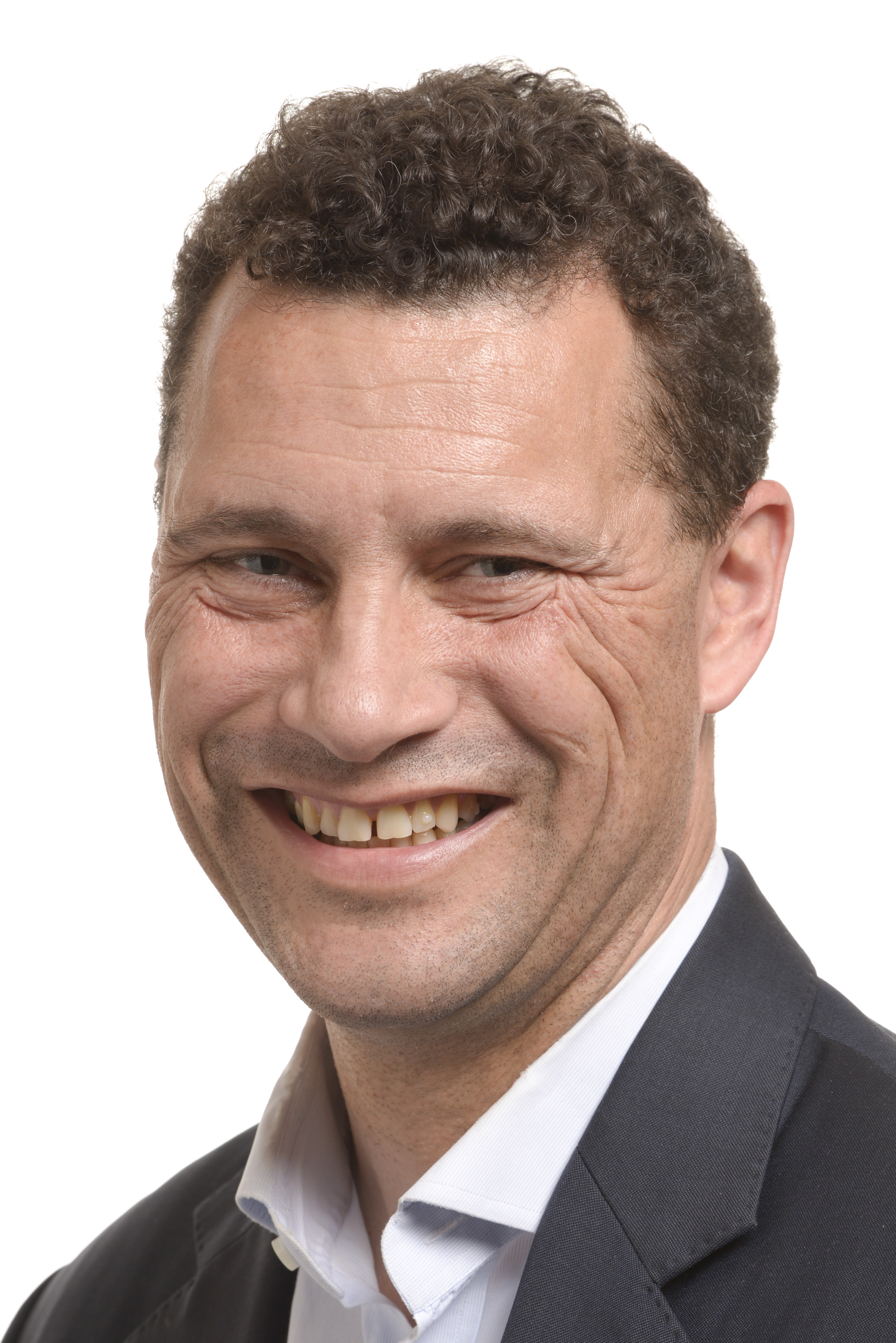

Member of the European Parliament for North West England
- In office 1 July 2014 – 1 July 2019
- Preceded by: Robert Atkins
- Succeeded by: David Bull

UKIP portfolios
- 2014: Economics
- 2015–2016: Immigration

Personal details
- Born: Steven Marcus Woolfe; 6 October 1967 (age 59) Moss Side, Manchester, England
- Party: Independent (since 2016)
- Other political affiliations: Conservative (2000–2010); UKIP (2010–2016)
- Education: St. Bede's College, Manchester
- Alma mater: Aberystwyth University; City Law School

Steven Marcus Woolfe (born 6 October 1967) is a British barrister, writer, commentator and former politician. He is currently the Director of the Centre for Migration & Economic Prosperity, a research think tank studying population and immigration into the UK, Europe and US. He was a Member of the European Parliament (MEP) for North West England from 2014 until 2019. From 2014, he was a UKIP MEP, but resigned to become an independent MEP in October 2016 following his opposition to the party's overly negative policy on immigration. He remained independent until July 2019.

== Early life and education ==
Woolfe was born in Moss Side in Manchester, and grew up on a council estate in Burnage. His maternal grandmother Christine emigrated to Britain from Ireland and married James, an Englishman. Both his parents were born in Manchester: his father was mixed race, born to a British Jewish mother and a Black American father. He abandoned Woolfe and his brother as a small child.

Woolfe is the eldest of a family of four. His younger half-brother is Nathan Woolfe, a footballer who has played for various clubs as a striker.

Woolfe attended St Bernard's Roman Catholic Primary School, a voluntary-aided state-maintained school in Burnage. As a child of a single mother, he won a scholarship to St Bede's College, a co-educational independent school in the Manchester suburb of Whalley Range, where he excelled at sport, debating and study.

Woolfe read law at Aberystwyth University, won several awards and graduated with a Bachelor of Laws (LLB) degree in 1990.

== Legal career ==
Woolfe pursued further studies at the Inns of Court School of Law in London, before being called to the Bar at the Inner Temple. He initially undertook pupillage at Francis Taylor Buildings, before completing pupilage at 2 Harcourt Buildings (now 5 St Andrews Hill), where he practiced criminal and general common law. He continued at 5 Paper Buildings but did not take tenancy there, as he moved into his first role as an employed barrister, acting as General Counsel for a stockbroking firm, Merchant Securities Limited.

He moved to the Union Bank of Switzerland, London office in the legal and compliance department, where he managed the private banking and derivatives desks and was in charge of anti-money laundering procedures. He then went on to work for several investment banks, such as Credit Suisse, Barclays Capital and Standard Bank, as well as Aviva.

Before becoming interested in politics, he spent several years as general counsel for hedge fund managers such as Boyer Allan Investment Management LLP. He co-founded the Hedge Fund Lawyers Association, and was its chair for 2010 to 2012. Since 2019, Woolfe has also acted as a legal and regulatory consultant to financial institutions.

== Political career ==
Woolfe was introduced to UKIP by Lord Pearson of Rannoch and made his debut speech at UKIP's 2010 annual conference in Torquay. In 2010, Nigel Farage declared his intention to stand in the UKIP leadership. He appointed Woolfe, who was not a member of UKIP, to his team of senior spokespeople, as Economics spokesman. In 2011, Woolfe was elected to UKIP's National Executive Committee.

Woolfe stood as a UKIP candidate for the City and East for the Greater London Authority in May 2012.

In November 2012, Woolfe won UKIP's nomination to contest the Greater Manchester Police and Crime Commissioner elections. Woolfe's campaign message was one of tough on crime and the support of community policing. He finished fifth, polling 23,256 votes (8.55%).

On 8 May 2014, Woolfe chaired a public meeting in Westminster promoting UKIP's Black and Minority Ethnic (BME) candidates, despite Farage's initial opposition.

Woolfe was selected as number 3 on UKIP's regional party list in the 2014 European Parliament election in North West England. He was one of three candidates from the party to be elected as MEP in the region.

In 2014, he became party spokesman for migration policy. Woolfe called for a fair and ethical stance towards migration, stressing that migration should be based on merit, not on race, religion, colour or creed. This policy was taken up by Vote Leave and the Conservative Party during and after the Brexit Referendum.

From July 2014 until May 2015, Woolfe was responsible for macro policy and taxation, as well as being UKIP's City of London spokesman. He advocated a simplified and lower tax regime for all, believing that the middle classes have been squeezed with the 40% tax band. He has called for the 45% tax band to be abolished and replaced with a higher threshold for 40% band at £45,000. He has also called for those on minimum wage to be taken out of paying tax altogether.

On 4 September 2014, Woolfe was chosen as UKIP's prospective parliamentary candidate for Stockport. Woolfe came third at the 2015 general election, with 13% of the vote.

=== UKIP leadership bid ===
In July 2016, Woolfe launched his bid to become leader of UKIP following the resignation of Nigel Farage. He gained the support of the leaders of UKIP in Wales, Scotland and London. His running-mate was Welsh UKIP leader Nathan Gill.

Woolfe promised to 'ruthlessly' go after Labour seats in Northern England and the Midlands. Woolfe said UKIP has "won the argument" for managed immigration, and promised to drive a new focus on social mobility. Furthermore, Woolfe also said he would build on the 4 million votes UKIP got at the last election.

On 31 July 2016, he was blocked by the party's National Executive Committee after narrowly missing the deadline for submitting his application.

On 5 October 2016, Woolfe was reported saying that he had been in talks with the Conservative Party about defecting and it was revealed he was being advised by Jago Pearson, a public relations consultant linked to the Conservatives, though he ultimately did not. After two years as a UKIP MEP, he resigned saying UKIP was in a 'death spiral' and remained as an independent for the next three years.

=== Post-political career ===
Woolfe became the director of legal affairs of think tank The Centre For Migration & Economic Prosperity in 2019. He is also the editor and head of communications for Libertatio.

== Personal life ==
Woolfe married Fiona Olivia Thomson in 2011 at the All Saints Church, Houghton, Hampshire. They have a daughter. He is a Catholic.

== See also ==
- Euroscepticism
