= July–September 2016 UK Independence Party leadership election =

Political party election

September 2016 UK Independence Party leadership election
- 16 September 2016
- Turnout: 54.5%
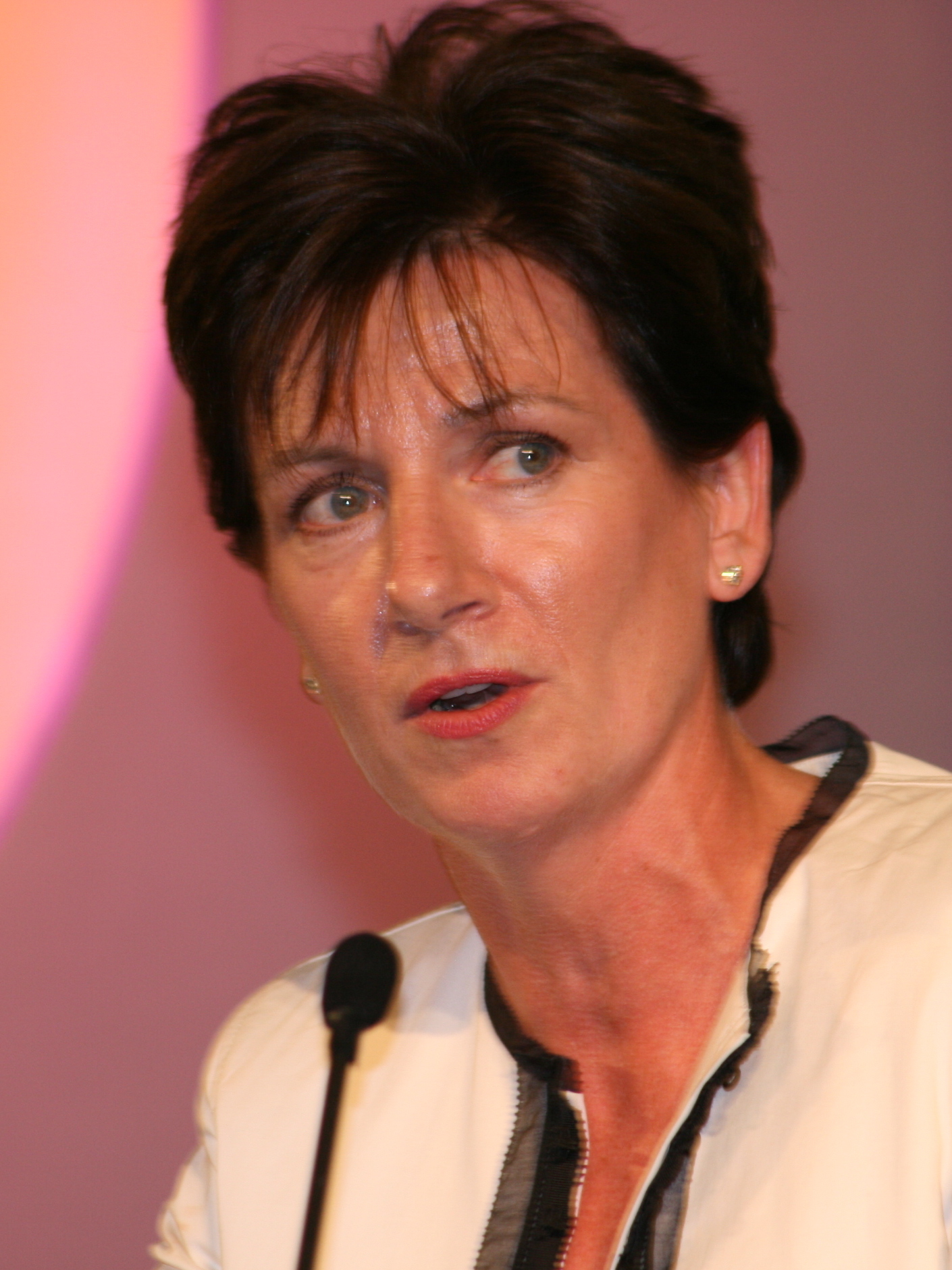

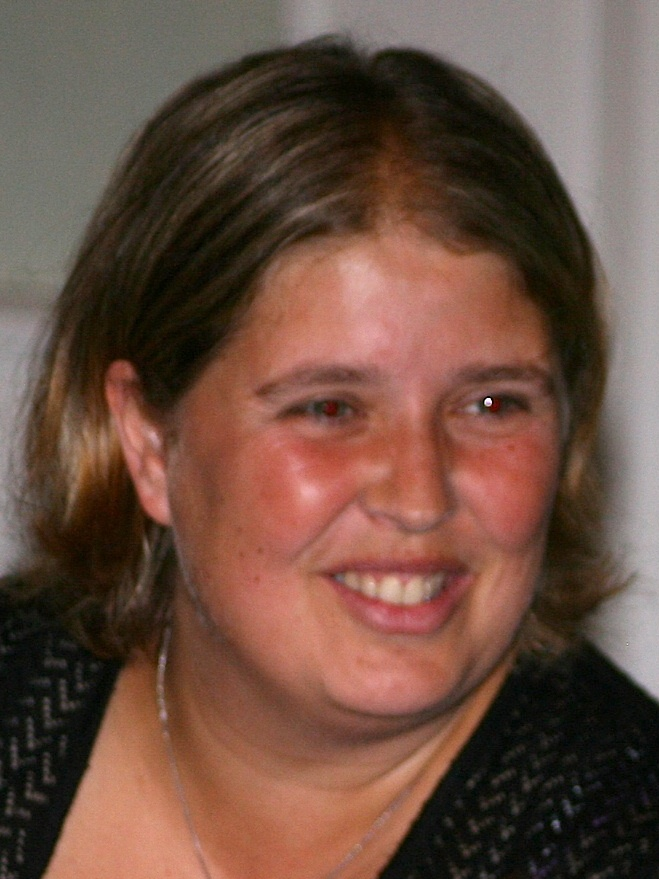

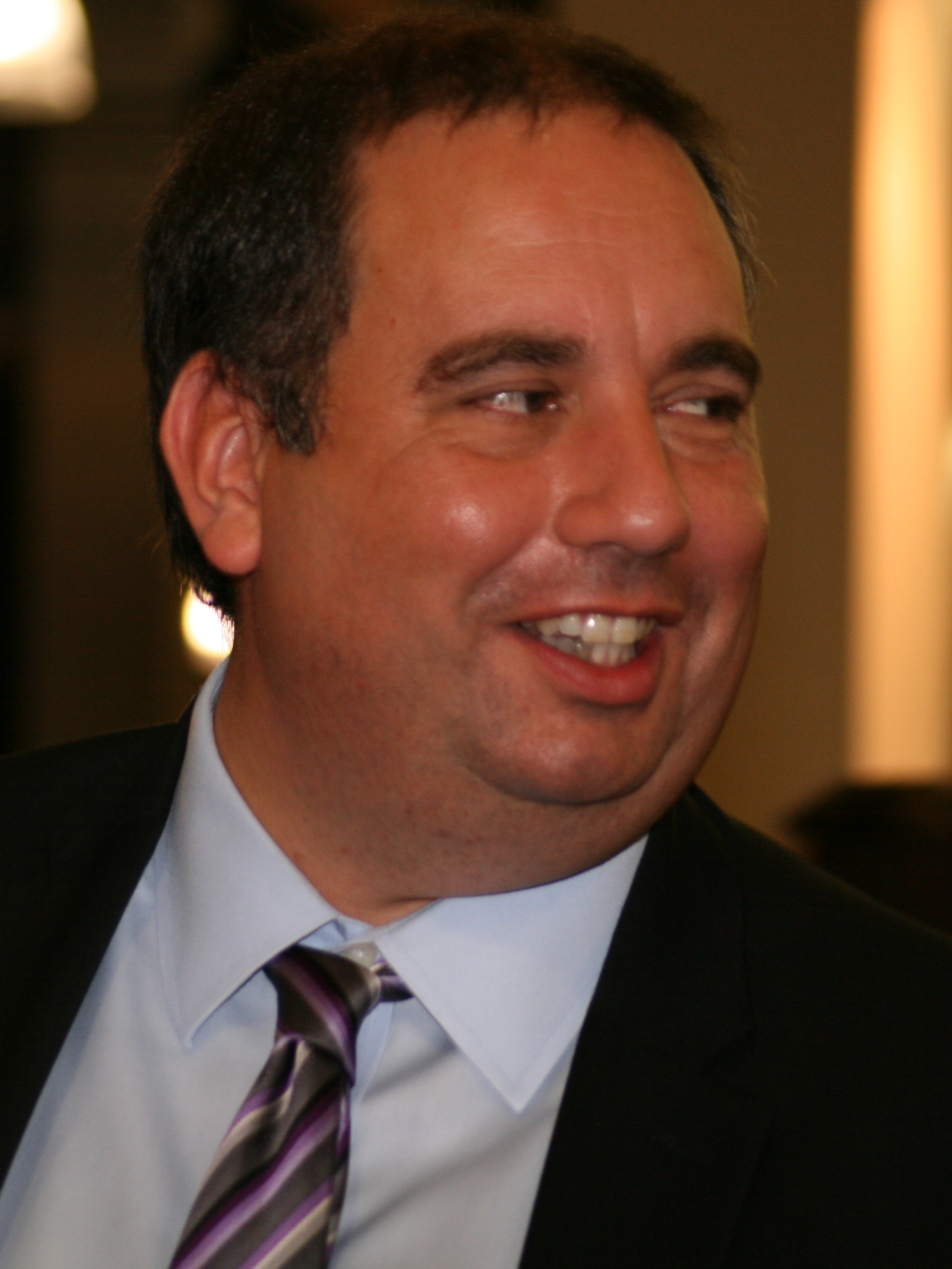
| Candidate | Diane James | Lisa Duffy | Bill Etheridge |
| Running mate | – | Patrick O'Flynn | Mike Hookem |
| Percentage | 46.2% | 25.1% | 13.7% |
| Popular vote | 8,451 | 4,591 | 2,052 |
| | UKI | UKI |
| Candidate | Phillip Broughton | Elizabeth Jones |
| Running mate | – | Lawrence Webb |
| Percentage | 8.4% | 6.6% |
| Popular vote | 1,545 | 1,203 |
Leader before election
Nigel Farage
Leader after election
Diane James (elect) (Note: Diane James never took office and Farage legally remained party leader.)

The September 2016 UK Independence Party leadership election was triggered after Nigel Farage, the leader of the UK Independence Party, announced on 4 July 2016, following the Leave result in the UK referendum on EU membership, that he would step down when a new leader had been elected.

As more than one candidate ran for the party leadership, it was the first contested UKIP leadership election since 2010; Farage won the 2014 leadership election unopposed. Diane James won with 8,451 votes. However, just 18 days later, she stepped down as leader and Farage was reinstated as interim leader. A second leadership election was held in November, which was won by Paul Nuttall.

== Campaign ==
Suggested potential candidates at the time of Nigel Farage's resignation included Paul Nuttall, Steven Woolfe, Suzanne Evans, Diane James, Peter Whittle, Douglas Carswell and Patrick O'Flynn, among others. Farage stated he would not endorse any candidate.

Evans was ineligible at the time, because she had been suspended from the party. She declared that she desired her suspension lifted so that she could stand for the leadership. Evans did not, however, at the time pursue an appeal, which is the only means under the party constitution to lift a suspension.

Paul Nuttall announced on 9 July 2016 that he would not stand for the leadership and that he would step down as Deputy Leader of the party.

The party's National Executive Committee (NEC) stated that the position of leader would be advertised online. Anyone wishing to apply would need 50 nominations from party members and would be required to pay a £5,000 fee. There was to be a series of hustings over the summer. Every party member would have a vote, and the winner was to be declared at the party's conference on 15 September.

On 10 July 2016 the NEC decided that eligible candidates had to have been members for at least five years, ruling out several possible nominations including Suzanne Evans, Douglas Carswell and Arron Banks; although the NEC later reduced this requirement to two years' membership, potential candidates previously thought to be ineligible did not stand. Woolfe, however, was reported to have allowed his membership to lapse for a few months (along with previously failing to declare a conviction from 14 years earlier for being drunk while in charge of a scooter (not drink-driving) when he stood for a police and crime commissioner post, in possible breach of electoral law); the NEC was to decide on his eligibility during final vetting procedures. (The NEC later declared him ineligible, not owing to these issues but because he missed the nomination deadline by 17 minutes).

In late July 2016, party chairman Steve Crowther told UKIP Wales Leader Nathan Gill, standing for Deputy Leader on a joint ticket with Woolfe, to stop "double jobbing", i.e. to stand down as an MEP now that he was a member of the Welsh Assembly for North Wales, or instead face having his right to stand for election removed by the party.

At the close of nominations on 31 July 2016, Woolfe missed the deadline for submitting his application by 17 minutes, owing to technical problems; on 3 August, the NEC ruled that this made him ineligible to stand. Three members of the NEC subsequently resigned in protest. The vote was seen in the context of a tension within the party between Farage supporters, backing Woolfe, and the more centrist Evans/Carswell wing.

Two candidates emerged in August only upon the finalisation of candidates: Phillip Broughton, a former parliamentary candidate for Hartlepool; and Diane James, MEP for South East England. Jonathan Arnott later withdrew midway through the contest on 15 August 2016, saying he thought he could only come second and that he was not prepared to "court controversy in order to gain column inches" to be elected Leader.

James was criticised for not attending any hustings events.

== Bill Etheridge ==
His policy proposals included cheaper beer, better representation for fathers in the family court system and a referendum on bringing back the death penalty. Also amongst his policy proposals were prison reform and a move to save the British public house by reintroducing smoking via the use of efficient extraction systems as used within the European Parliament itself. While in favour of Muslim faith schools and same-sex marriage, he advocates banning the Burka.

== Lisa Duffy ==
On 8 August she made a speech calling for a shutdown of Muslim schools and Sharia courts and a ban on Islamic full-face veils in public spaces. The remarks were compared to those of Donald Trump. Duffy denied "chasing the bigot vote".

== Candidates ==
=== Declared ===
- Phillip Broughton, UKIP candidate for Hartlepool in 2015
- Lisa Duffy, Town and District Councillor for Ramsey; Chief of Staff for Patrick O'Flynn (standing on joint ticket with O'Flynn as Deputy Leader)
- Bill Etheridge, MEP for the West Midlands and Dudley Borough Councillor for Sedgley Ward (standing on joint ticket with Mike Hookem as Deputy Leader)
- Diane James, Co-Deputy Chair of UKIP since 2016; MEP for South East England
- Elizabeth Jones, UKIP NEC Member; UKIP Lambeth Deputy Chair (standing on joint ticket with Lawrence Webb as Deputy Leader)

=== Withdrew ===
- Jonathan Arnott, MEP for North East England (had been standing on joint ticket with Louise Bours as Deputy Leader)

=== Ineligible ===
The following people, whether they declared their candidacies or were considered potential candidates, were declared ineligible for various reasons:

- Douglas Carswell, MP for Clacton (had been a party member for less than two years; declined)
- Suzanne Evans, Co-Deputy Chair of UKIP from 2014 to 2016 (suspended from UKIP on 23 March 2016)
- Raheem Kassam, Editor of Breitbart London; former senior adviser to Nigel Farage (had been a party member for less than two years; endorsed Steven Woolfe)
- Mark Reckless, UKIP Economics Spokesman; Member of the Welsh Assembly for South Wales East; former MP for Rochester and Strood (had been a party member for less than two years)
- Steven Woolfe, UKIP Migration Spokesman; MEP for North West England (missed nomination deadline by 17 minutes; had been to stand on joint ticket with Nathan Gill as Deputy Leader)

=== Declined ===
The following individuals either declined to stand or were potential candidates who did not stand by the close of nominations:

- Tim Aker, MEP for the East of England
- David Coburn, MEP for Scotland; Leader of UKIP in Scotland
- Neil Hamilton, Leader of UKIP in the Welsh Assembly; Member of the Welsh Assembly for Mid and West Wales; Co-Deputy Chair of UKIP from 2014 to 2016
- David Kurten, London-wide Member of the London Assembly (endorsed Steven Woolfe)
- Paul Nuttall, Deputy Leader of UKIP; MEP for North West England
- Patrick O'Flynn, MEP for the East of England
- Margot Parker, UKIP Small Business Spokesperson; MEP for the East Midlands
- Peter Whittle, Leader of UKIP in the London Assembly and London-wide Member of the London Assembly (endorsed Steven Woolfe)

== Endorsements ==
=== Lisa Duffy ===
MEPs

- Patrick O'Flynn, MEP for the East of England (stood for Deputy Leader, on joint ticket with Duffy)
- Gerard Batten, MEP for London, founding member of UKIP
- Louise Bours, MEP for North West England

Other people

- Suzanne Evans, Co-Deputy Chair of UKIP from 2014 to 2016

=== Bill Etheridge ===
MEPs

- Mike Hookem, MEP for Yorkshire and the Humber and UKIP Defence Spokesperson (stood for Deputy Leader, on joint ticket with Etheridge)

=== Diane James ===
Other people

- Arron Banks, businessman; co-founder of the Leave.EU campaign; prominent UKIP donor (previously endorsed Steven Woolfe)

Organisations

- Leave.EU (previously endorsed Steven Woolfe)

=== Elizabeth Jones ===
Other people

- Lawrence Webb, UKIP candidate for Mayor of London in 2012 (stood for Deputy Leader, on joint ticket with Jones)

== Previous endorsements ==
=== Jonathan Arnott ===
MEPs

- Louise Bours, MEP for North West England
- James Carver, MEP for the West Midlands
- Jane Collins, MEP for Yorkshire and the Humber and UKIP Employment Spokesperson
- Julia Reid, MEP for South West England

Other people

- Michelle Brown, Member of the Welsh Assembly for North Wales
- David McNarry, Leader of UKIP in Northern Ireland; former member of the Northern Ireland Assembly for Strangford
- Jeffrey Titford, former leader of UKIP (2000–2002; 2010); former MEP for the East of England
- John Whittaker, former chairman of the UK Independence Party (2006–2008); former MEP for North West England

=== Steven Woolfe ===
MPs and MEPs

- Tim Aker, MEP for the East of England
- David Coburn, MEP for Scotland; Leader of UKIP in Scotland
- William Dartmouth, MEP for South West England; Co-Deputy Chair of UKIP since 2016
- Nathan Gill, MEP for Wales; Leader of UKIP Wales (was to stand on joint ticket with Woolfe, for Deputy Leader; campaign chair)
- Jill Seymour, MEP for the West Midlands

Other people

- Arron Banks, businessman; co-founder of the Leave.EU campaign; prominent UKIP donor
- Raheem Kassam, Editor of Breitbart London
- David Kurten, London-wide Member of the London Assembly
- Peter Whittle, Leader of UKIP in the London Assembly and London-wide Member of the London Assembly (deputy campaign chair)

Organisations

- Leave.EU

== Timetable ==
Nominations opened on 11 July 2016 and closed on 31 July. Campaigning took place in August, with a series of hustings taking place, before ballot papers were issued on 1 September to every party member, with the winner declared at the party's conference on 15 September. On 16 September, Diane James was elected leader of the party. When notifying the Electoral Commission of this, James signed the papers with "vi coactus" under her signature which meant the Electoral Commission were unable to process the change of leadership officially.

On 4 October 2016, 18 days after being elected, James resigned the party leadership, precipitating another election. Nigel Farage became interim leader as he was still officially recognised by the Electoral Commission as the UKIP leader due to the processing issues related to James' election.

== Results ==
Diane James was elected Leader with 46% of the vote. However, 18 days later she resigned the leadership, leading to the November 2016 leadership election.

UK Independence Party Leadership election, 2016
| Candidate | Votes | | % |
|---|---|---|---|
| ✓ Diane James | 8,451 | | 46.2% |
| Lisa Duffy | 4,591 | | 25.1% |
| Bill Etheridge | 2,052 | | 13.7% |
| Phillip Broughton | 1,545 | | 8.4% |
| Elizabeth Jones | 1,203 | | 6.6% |
| Turnout | | 17,842 | 54.5% |
Diane James elected as Leader ✓

== See also ==
- 2016 Conservative Party leadership election
- 2016 Green Party of England and Wales leadership election
- 2016 Labour Party leadership election (UK)
