= ITEM club =

UK economic forecasting group

The ITEM Club is an economic forecasting group based in the United Kingdom. ITEM stands for Independent Treasury Economic Model. It was founded in 1977 to produce quarterly economic UK forecasts, which are often mentioned in the UK news media. It has been sponsored by EY since 1999, and officially named the EY ITEM Club. The ITEM Club is clear in all its materials that it is independent of any political, academic or commercial bias despite corporate sponsorship.

The UK model is used by HM Treasury for its policy analysis and biannual Industry Act forecasts for the budget. This enables ITEM to explore the implications and unpublished assumptions behind Government forecasts and policy measures. ITEM can test whether Government claims are consistent and can assess which forecasts are credible and which are not.

Matt Swannell, a former Bank of England economist, took over from Martin Beck as the EY ITEM Club's Senior Economic Advisor in 2024, after Beck had been in the job since July 2021. Dr Howard Archer had held the role since June 2017, having taken over from Professor Peter Spencer, who had held the position since 2001.
