= James Carver =

British politician

James Carver FRGS
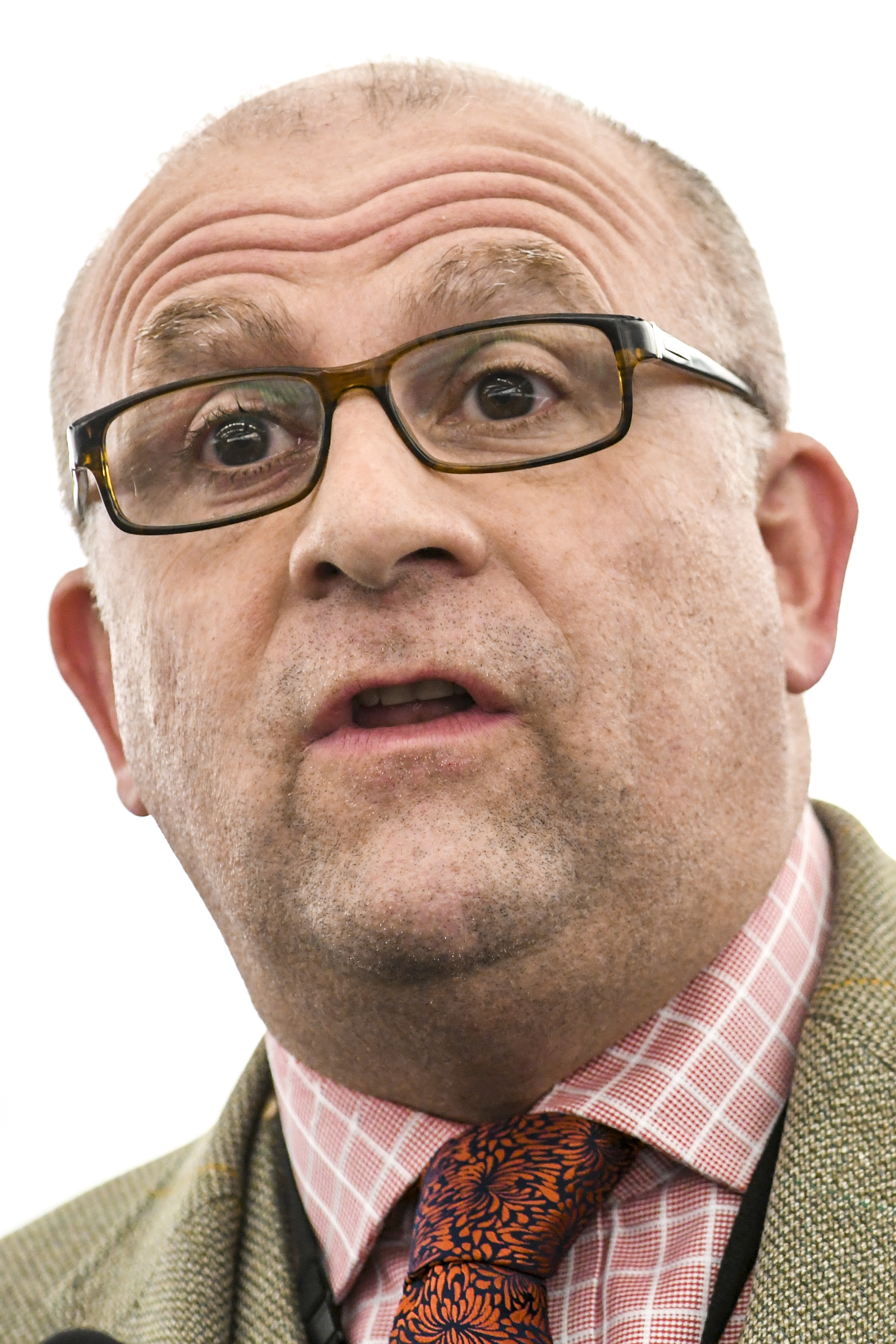
- Carver in 2019

UKIP Spokesperson for Foreign and Commonwealth Affairs
- In office 21 June 2014 – 25 April 2017
- Leader: Nigel Farage; Diane James (Elect); Nigel Farage (Acting); Paul Nuttall
- Preceded by: Office established
- Succeeded by: Ray Finch

Member of the European Parliament for the West Midlands
- In office 1 July 2014 – 1 July 2019
- Preceded by: Phil Bennion
- Succeeded by: Phil Bennion

Personal details
- Born: James Bruce Carver; 15 August 1969 (age 57) Farnborough, England, UK
- Party: Conservative (2021–2022); Independent (2018–2021); UK Independence Party (1996–2018)
- Education: Bromley College of Further and Higher Education

James Bruce Carver (born 15 August 1969) is a British politician who served as a Member of the European Parliament (MEP) for the West Midlands region between 2014 and 2019. He was elected in 2014 for the UK Independence Party, second on the list for the region, being elected together with Jill Seymour and Bill Etheridge. He resigned from UKIP in May 2018.

== Biography ==
Carver was born on 15 August 1969 in Farnborough, Kent and was educated at St John Rigby Catholic College and Orpington College of Further Education. At the age of eleven his parents separated due to his father's alcoholism, and he afterwards grew up in a one-parent family, living with his mother, who, when aged 15, he helped look after following her lung cancer diagnosis. She subsequently went into remission, but died very quickly from secondary cancer, two months after his 17th birthday in 1986. Raising himself thereafter, he later described the next few years as “the biggest learning curve of my life - It was either sink of swim”. He works in a client liaison role for the Medal Department of a leading auction London house, having previously rebuilt and run his family umbrella making business for thirty years, before closing it down in 2022.

== Political career ==
Previously a Labour voter, Carver joined UKIP in 1996 and stood in four general elections for UKIP: Orpington in 1997 (5th, 526 votes), Cheltenham in 2001 (6th, 482 votes), Preseli Pembrokeshire in 2005 (5th, 498 votes), and Stourbridge in 2015 (3rd, 7,774 votes). He was also sixth on the party list for London in the 1999 European election.

Carver is of Romanichal descent on his grandmother's side, giving rise to his interest in fostering better relationships with traveller communities. He believes that he is the only British Parliamentarian from a Romany background. He has also helped raise both money and awareness for the charity Scleroderma and Raynauds UK (SRUK) Society following the death of his first wife from scleroderma in 2009. He remarried in late 2014.

In April 2017, Carver resigned as UKIP's foreign affairs spokesperson following the party's promise to ban the wearing of the burqa in public. He said that "no one has the right to dictate what people should wear", and that the policy undermined his ability to represent British Muslims in his constituency.

In August 2017, Carver endorsed Henry Bolton in the UKIP leadership election, citing his credentials to restructure the party. Following the election of Bolton as leader of UKIP, Carver was appointed assistant deputy leader.

On 28 May 2018, after 22 years membership, Carver resigned from UKIP in frustration at what he perceived as a lurch to the right. Carver resigned from UKIP and then sat as an independent MEP until the end of the Eighth European Parliament, stating that he had become "out of kilter" with the party.

One of a handful of the former UKIP MEPs who chose not to designate with Reform UK, he did not stand for re-election at the 2019 European election and switched support to the Conservatives at the general election on their manifesto pledge to complete the formal process of Britain's withdrawal from the European Union.

He stood as a Conservative candidate in the 2021 local elections for his home ward of Nunnery, on Worcester City Council, becoming the first Conservative district councillor to win a seat in that ward for around 50 years taking 50% of the vote with a majority of 322 over his Labour opponent.

In February 2022, he resigned his council seat just ten months into his three-year term of office after becoming disillusioned with the local Conservative party.

== Elections contested ==
UK Parliament elections

Date of election	Constituency	Party	Votes	Percentage of votes	Result
1997 general election	Orpington	UKIP	526	0.9	Not elected
2001 general election	Cheltenham	UKIP	482	1.2	Not elected
2005 general election	Preseli Pembrokeshire	UKIP	498	1.3	Not elected
2015 general election	Stourbridge	UKIP	7,774	16.9	Not elected

European Parliament elections (Multi-member constituency; party list)

Date of election	Region	Party	Votes	Percentage of votes	Result
1999 European election	London	UKIP	61,741	5.4	Not elected
2014 European election	West Midlands	UKIP	428,010	31.5	Elected

== Member of the European Parliament ==
Carver was first elected to the European Parliament in 2014. He serves on the European Parliament Committee on Foreign Affairs.

Among the topics Carver has raised are:

- EU expansionism and military confrontation
- Economic issues and hardships arising from the eurozone
- The role of the EU operating outside of international law either at home and abroad

He also supports:

- Fostering better understanding of the gypsy communities and how to integrate with mainstream society
- The banning of legal highs
- Recognition of Somaliland
- Addressing the rise of Islamist extremism in the Middle East and Europe

Carver was critical of EU's policy in Israel, claiming that its actions did not comply with the founding treaties of the EU. He stated that structures built by the EU in a number of Beduin encampments outside Ma'aleh Adumim and on the Jerusalem-Jericho road bearing the EU logo are disrespectful of the rule of law: "EU member states would not allow such behavior within their own borders, nor would the EU endorse or find it anywhere within the European Union."

On 28 May 2018, Carver resigned from UKIP to sit as an independent MEP.
