= London independence =

Political movement in the United Kingdom

Brexit referendum results in Greater London by borough Leave Remain

London independence, sometimes shortened to Londependence and Londexit, refers to a belief favouring full-fledged independence for Greater London as a city-state separate from the United Kingdom. The idea received particular attention after the 2016 United Kingdom European Union membership referendum, in which the country at large voted to leave the European Union, but 60% of Londoners voted to remain, though the concept of an independent London had been discussed sporadically for some years before.

Banner of arms of the Greater London Council (1965–86)

== Movement ==
Supporters have often cited Singapore as a successful example for a fully-fledged and sovereign London.

London's status within the United Kingdom has been debated for several years, with some calls for increased autonomy, Supporters have frequently cited Greater London's population of over 9 million people, its economic size, its global role, its diverse population and its unique challenges compared to the rest of England as reasons for greater autonomy. The idea of London becoming a city-state resurfaced during the Scottish independence referendum of 2014.

The movement for either increased autonomy or full sovereignty received a boost following the 2016 United Kingdom European Union membership referendum in 2016, during which the UK as a whole voted to leave the European Union (at under 52% leave), although the majority of London voted for the UK to remain in the EU (60% remain). This led to 180,000 Londoners petitioning Sadiq Khan, Mayor of London online to seek London's independence from the UK so it could remain part of the EU. Supporters cite London's status as a "world city" and its demographic and economic differences from the rest of the United Kingdom, and argue that it should become a city-state based on the model of Singapore, while remaining an EU member state.

Spencer, Lord Livermore of the Labour Party said that London's independence "should be a goal", arguing that a Greater London city-state would have twice the GDP of Singapore. Journalist Tony Travers argued that Khan would be "well within his rights to tell the government London didn't vote for Brexit and that City Hall now viewed the government as dysfunctional." Analyst Kevin Doran said that London becoming an independent state is not just possible, but inevitable "within 20 to 30 years' time."

After the EU referendum vote, Peter John, the Labour Party leader of the London Borough of Southwark stated it would be a "legitimate question" for London to consider its future in the United Kingdom and the European Union. Southwark had voted 72% in favour of remaining in the EU. John also said "London would be the 15th largest EU state, bigger than Austria, Denmark and Ireland and our values are in line with Europe – outward looking, confident of our place in the world, enriched by our diversity and stronger working together with our friends and neighbours than we are alone."

Labour MP for Tottenham David Lammy wrote a piece in the Evening Standard in March 2017 arguing in favour of London becoming a city state in the event of a Hard or No deal Brexit.

The Londependence Party was a registered political party and first stood candidates in the May 2021 London Assembly Elections. The party gained 5,746 votes or 0.2% on the London-wide list. This party deregistered February 2024.

== Public opinion ==
Two opinion polls have been carried out by the polling company YouGov on Londoners' preferred constitutional status.

Date(s) conducted	Polling organisation/client	Sample size	London Independence	London Parliament	Status Quo (London Assembly)	Abolish the Assembly	Undecided
1–6 July 2016	YouGov/Evening Standard	1,061	11%	23%	32%	7%	28%
8–13 Oct 2014	YouGov/Evening Standard		5%	30%	30%	6%	29%

A different survey of 2,001 people carried out by the firm Censuswide in September 2014 found that 19.9% of Londoners wanted the city to become independent, with support for this being highest among people aged 25–34.

== Criticism ==
The idea of London independence has been criticised as unrealistic. Brian Groom of the Financial Times wrote that "it is ludicrous to think of any nation gladly waving goodbye to its capital", calling the idea of secession a "fantasy".

Dr. James Ker-Lindsay, a senior research fellow at the London School of Economics who specialises in secession movements, stated with regard to a referendum on London Independence that it "seems difficult to see how any government would ever agree to such a vote." He also said if London broke away unilaterally it would not be able to join the United Nations, as its membership application would be subject to the United Kingdom's permanent veto on the United Nations Security Council.

== See also ==
- Scottish independence
- Singapore-on-Thames
- Urban secession
