= Diane James =

Brexit Party politician and former leader of the UK Independence Party (born 1959)

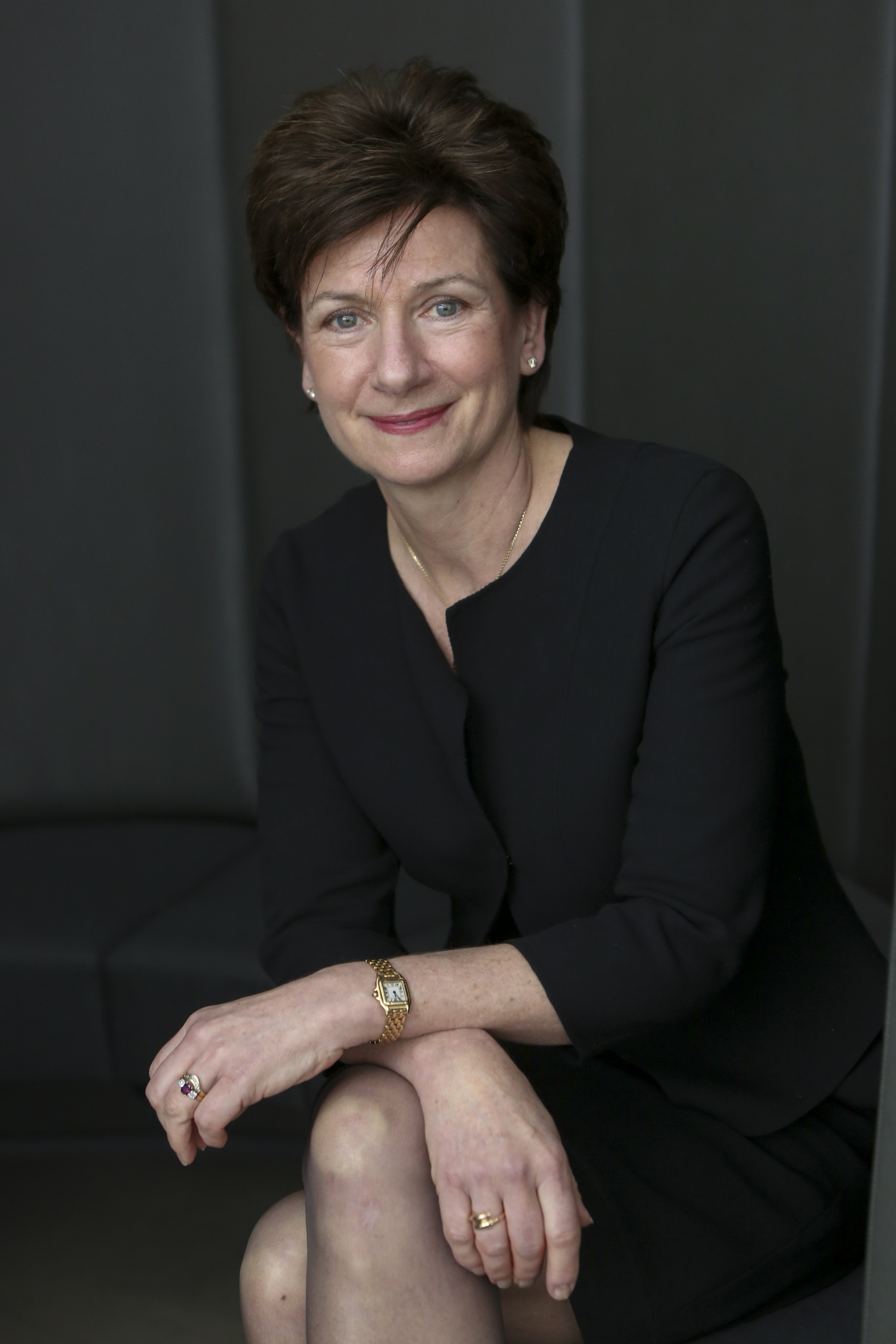
- James in 2018

Leader-elect of the UK Independence Party
- Never took office (Note: James was elected party leader on 16 September 2016 but never took up office and Farage legally remained party leader.); 16 September 2016 – 4 October 2016
- Preceded by: Nigel Farage
- Succeeded by: Paul Nuttall

Deputy Chair of the UK Independence Party
- In office 24 February 2016 – 16 September 2016 Serving with The Earl of Dartmouth
- Leader: Nigel Farage
- Preceded by: Suzanne Evans
- Succeeded by: Suzanne Evans

UKIP Home Affairs and Justice Spokesperson
- In office 21 July 2014 – 16 September 2016
- Leader: Nigel Farage
- Preceded by: Position established
- Succeeded by: Jane Collins

Member of the European Parliament for South East England
- In office 1 July 2014 – 1 July 2019
- Preceded by: Sharon Bowles
- Succeeded by: Alexandra Phillips

Personal details
- Born: 20 November 1959 (age 66) Bedford, England
- Party: Reform UK (since 2019)
- Other political affiliations: Independent (2007–2011; 2016–2019); UK Independence Party (2011–2016); Conservative (before 2007)
- Education: University of West London
- Website: dianejamesmep.com

Diane Martine James (born 20 November 1959) is a British politician who was a Member of the European Parliament (MEP) for South East England from 2014 to 2019. She was briefly leader-elect of the UK Independence Party (UKIP) from September 2016 to October 2016, but resigned before formalising her leadership. At the time of her election to the European Parliament, James was one of three UKIP MEPs for South East England, before joining the Brexit Party in 2019.

James was born in Bedford in 1959, and was a councillor on Waverley Borough Council from 2007 until 2015, when she lost the seat to the Conservative Party. She was elected to the European Parliament in 2014. Following the resignation of Nigel Farage, she was elected leader of UKIP in September 2016 as his successor. She resigned from the leadership of the party on 4 October 2016, 18 days after being elected. On 21 November 2016, James announced that she was leaving UKIP and would henceforth sit as an independent.

== Early life ==
Diane Martine James was born in Bedford in 1959, where her father was an engineer and her mother a housewife. She was educated at Rochester Grammar School, Kent and Thames Valley University, Slough. James spent three decades working in the health industry, where she established an international consultancy firm. She is fluent in both French and German.

== Political career ==
James was elected to Waverley Borough Council as an independent, representing Ewhurst ward, after falling out with local Conservatives in 2007. She stood as an independent candidate in the 2011 Cranleigh and Ewhurst by-election in Surrey, receiving 20.3% of the vote. She announced she was joining the UK Independence Party (UKIP) shortly after the 2011 local elections, but said that she would not stand down and fight a by-election. She lost her seat in 2015 after standing as the UKIP candidate in that year's elections. Her fellow UKIP councillors all lost their seats at the same time.

James came second in the 2013 Eastleigh by-election with 27.8% of the vote, an increase of 24.2% on the 2010 figure. She was elected to the European Parliament in the 2014 election. James was the party's Home Affairs spokesperson, represented UKIP on the BBC's Question Time, and took part in debates at the Cambridge Union Society.

In December 2014, she was selected by UKIP in North West Hampshire to be its parliamentary candidate, having been given a 1.2% chance of winning. However, a few hours after making a speech at the 2015 UKIP Spring Conference in Margate, Kent, she stepped down from the Westminster candidacy "for personal reasons".

=== UKIP leadership ===
Following the resignation of UKIP leader Nigel Farage, James stood in the election to succeed him in August 2016. She emerged as one of the frontrunners. On 16 September she was announced as the new leader, having received 8,451 votes (46.2% of votes cast); she was the first woman to hold the post.

On 4 October 2016, James confirmed that she would not be pursuing the leadership of the party despite winning the leadership election. James issued a statement saying that she had decided not to become party leader, because "It has become clear that I do not have sufficient authority, nor the full support of all my MEP colleagues and party officers to implement changes I believe necessary and upon which I based my campaign." Upon signing the document that notified the Electoral Commission of her election as UKIP leader, James added the Latin term vi coactus (under duress) after her signature. The Commission was unable to process the document due to her use of the words.

She resigned her party membership on 21 November 2016, stating "it was time to move on" and that her relationship with UKIP had become "increasingly difficult", although she would continue to sit in the European Parliament as an independent.

Following her resignation, the leadership of UKIP passed back to Nigel Farage who was selected as the interim Party leader, and another leadership election was held in November in which Paul Nuttall was elected as the new leader of UKIP. Nuttall kept that position only six months.

=== Post-UKIP ===
In autumn 2016, she said that Russian President Vladimir Putin was one of her political heroes: "I admire him from the point of view that he's standing up for his country."

On 8 April 2017, James stated she would consider standing for a seat in the British House of Commons as a Conservative at the next general election. Ten days later Theresa May called a snap election held on 8 June, in which James did not stand.

Remaining an MEP for the full 2014–2019 term, James joined the Brexit Party on 5 February 2019. She left the European Parliament at the expiration of her term on 1 July, five weeks after the 2019 European Parliament election in which she did not seek to be re-elected.

European Parliament
Preceded by Sharon Bowles	Member of the European Parliament for South East England; 2014–present	Incumbent
Party political offices
Preceded by Nigel Farage	Leader of the UK Independence Party; 2016	Succeeded by Nigel Farage; Acting
