= Count Dankula =

Scottish YouTuber (born 1987)

Mark Meechan
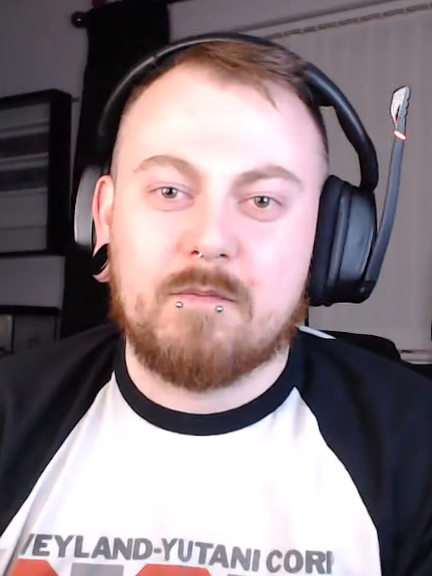
- Meechan in 2017
- Born: 19 October 1987 (age 39); Coatbridge, Scotland
- Political party: Scottish Libertarian Party
- Other political affiliations: UKIP (2018–2019)
- Other name: Count Dankula
- Spouse: Suzanne Kelly (m. 2019; div. 2024)
- Children: 2

YouTube information
- Channels: Count Dankula; Count Dankula 2 : Electric Boogaloo; Count Dankula Streams
- Years active: 2015–present
- Subscribers: 1.12 million (Count Dankula); 416,000 (Count Dankula 2); 16,500 (Count Dankula Streams)
- Views: 253 million (Count Dankula); 112.7 million (Count Dankula 2); 472,000 (Count Dankula Streams)
- Last updated: 26 December 2025

Mark Meechan (pronounced [miːkæn]; born 19 October 1987), better known as Count Dankula, is a Scottish YouTuber, comedian, and former candidate for the European Parliament.

Meechan received press coverage after posting a video to YouTube which depicts him teaching his girlfriend's dog to raise its paw in the manner of a Nazi salute, and to react to the phrase "Do you wanna gas the Jews?" Meechan was arrested and convicted of being "grossly offensive" under the Communications Act 2003, following a trial in March 2018. The arrest generated controversy and discussions about free speech. In April 2018, Meechan was fined £800. Meechan stated he would not pay the fine, and instead donated £800 to the Glasgow Children's Hospital Charity. In March 2019, the money was seized from his bank account by an arrestment order.

== Arrest ==
In April 2016, Meechan posted a video on YouTube of his girlfriend's pet pug Buddha titled "M8 Yer Dugs A Nazi". At the start of the video, he says: "My girlfriend is always ranting and raving about how cute and adorable her wee dog is so I thought I would turn him into the least cute thing I could think of, which is a Nazi." In the video, the dog, prompted by the command "Sieg Heil", raises his right paw in the manner of a Nazi salute, watches a speech by Adolf Hitler (footage shown from the Triumph of the Will), and responds immediately when Meechan asks if he wants to "gas the Jews". It ends with images of Hitler and Buddha the dog depicted with a toothbrush moustache similar to Hitler's.

Meechan was arrested on suspicion of breaching the Communications Act 2003. On 19 March 2018, Meechan was convicted of breaching the act by Sheriff Derek O'Carroll at Airdrie Sheriff Court. The court ruled that Meechan's claim that the video was a joke intended for his girlfriend "lacked credibility" as Meechan's girlfriend did not subscribe to the YouTube channel to which the video was posted. On 23 April 2018, Meechan was sentenced to a fine of £800, with no prison sentence.

=== Reaction ===
Approximately 500 people gathered in London to protest for free speech when the sentence was handed out. Following Meechan's conviction, British comedians Ricky Gervais and David Baddiel made comments supporting Meechan. Others who opposed the prosecution included Kenan Malik, Tim Blair, Helen Dale, Douglas Murray, Jordan Peterson, John Cleese, Tom Walker, Shappi Khorsandi, Marc Randazza, Jonathan Turley and Stephen Fry. Index on Censorship CEO Jodie Ginsberg stated that the right to free expression must include the right to offend, "otherwise the freedom is meaningless".

Sitcom writer Graham Linehan initially condemned Meechan; he later retracted his condemnation and apologised to Meechan. Meechan responded by saying that Linehan's show Father Ted also contained Nazi-related jokes. Meechan was scrutinised for embracing support from right-wing figures Alex Jones and Tommy Robinson, to which he replied: "Imagine totally abandoning protecting human rights, just because someone you don't like is defending them too. Astounding." On 6 May 2018, Meechan spoke at the "Day for Freedom" rally, organised by Robinson, which was described as far-right by news media and observers.

David Coburn, the United Kingdom Independence Party Member of the European Parliament for Scotland, released a two-page statement condemning the ruling as "an embarrassment". Philip Davies, Conservative MP for Shipley, brought up Meechan's case in the House of Commons and said: "Can we have a debate about freedom of speech in this country – something this country has long held dear and is in danger of throwing away needlessly?"

Other views included those of Rabbi Abraham Cooper, associate dean of the Simon Wiesenthal Centre, who stated, "If I were the judge, I would sentence the young man to meet with aging Holocaust survivors and UK World War II war heroes to learn why the Nazi Seig [sic] should never be a laughing matter", but he also stated he did not believe the offence was deserving jail time.

Meechan started a GoFundMe campaign on 24 April 2018 to raise £100,000 for an appeal, reaching the goal the next day. In August 2018, Meechan announced that his request for an appeal had been denied by a member of the Sheriff Appeal Court, who also accused Meechan's lawyer of contempt. The letter stated that the appeal was "not arguable" due to the nature of the "deeply unpleasant offence". Meechan stated that he planned to contest the matter with the Scottish Criminal Cases Review Commission. Meechan's lawyer Dorothy Bain subsequently petitioned the High Court of Justiciary to hear the case. Senior judge Lord Carloway opined that the High Court did not have the power to grant an appeal denied by the Sheriff Court. In March 2019, the £800 was seized from Meechan's bank account under an arrestment order.

On 17 June 2020, Meechan announced that his additional appeal to the Supreme Court was also rejected. Meechan stated his intention to bring the case to the European Court of Human Rights.

BBC Scotland planned to feature Meechan in a 2019 debate programme, The Collective, and had him film two episodes. However, the network announced that these episodes would not be aired after a backlash over the announcement. BBC Three produced a documentary on Meechan's case which aired in July 2019.

== YouTube career ==
In 2018, Meechan launched the series "Absolute Mad Lads" on his main YouTube Channel, wherein he explores the insane lives and antics of individuals throughout history who have, in his estimation, earned the title of "Absolute Mad Lads". These figures include Rainer Winkler, General Butt Naked, Ned Kelly, Mad Jack Churchill, GG Allin, Christopher Lee, Buster Keaton, Jim Jones, Ricardo López, Purple Aki, Richard "Beebo" Russell, and Marvin Heemeyer, among others. Meechan's main channel (which also featured videos regarding his court case, issues surrounding freedom of speech and, during his earlier YouTube career, had comedy skits) has amassed a following of 1.1 million subscribers and over 174 million views, while his second channel (which focuses more on politics) has over 340,000 subscribers and 41 million views.

== Politics ==
In the BBC Three documentary regarding his trial, Meechan said he was once a communist and left-wing before the controversy surrounding him. He currently identifies as a libertarian, though his politics have become progressively more right-wing in recent years.

On 16 June 2018, Meechan announced that he had joined UKIP along with fellow right-wing YouTubers Carl Benjamin and Paul Joseph Watson in what Watson describes as an attempted "soft coup". In April 2019, Meechan said he intended to stand for MEP on behalf of UKIP in the upcoming 2019 European Parliament election in the United Kingdom. During his campaign, the BBC reported that Meechan had directed his followers on Twitter to join a Discord channel containing racist content and expressions of support for neo-Nazi organisations. The report also stated that Meechan, using the name Count Dankula, had posted racial slurs about black people in the channel. Following the report, Discord banned the server. He was named fourth on UKIP's list in Scotland, but was not elected after UKIP won only 1.8% of the vote in Scotland.

In November 2019, Meechan posted a video announcing that he had left UKIP, citing internal disputes and backstabbing within the party over their leadership as his reason for leaving. Meechan stood in the 2021 Scottish Parliament election as a candidate for the Scottish Libertarian Party, finishing fifth in Motherwell and Wishaw with 254 votes. He was also first on the party's regional list for the Central Scotland region.

In February 2026, Searchlight reported that Meechan had expressed support for Rupert Lowe and Restore Britain on Twitter, writing: "I really like Rupert and would much prefer him over Farage but I have concerns over vote splitting."

== Personal life ==
Meechan married his girlfriend in 2019. His wife gave birth to their first daughter in 2021 and second in 2023. Meechan announced on 24 June 2024 that he and his wife were getting a divorce. Meechan has said he converted to Eastern Orthodox Christianity at some point in 2024.

According to Meechan, Buddha, the pet pug at the centre of Meechan's 2016 YouTube video, was euthanised in August 2025 after suffering from a series of health issues.

== Electoral history ==
2021

2021 Scottish Parliament election: Motherwell and Wishaw
Party	Candidate	Constituency			Regional		
Party	Candidate	Votes	%	±%	Votes	%	±%
SNP	Clare Adamson (Note: Incumbent member for this constituency)	18,156	53.2	▲0.7	15,672	45.9	▼1.8
Labour	Martine Nolan	10,343	30.3	▼0.8	8,429	24.7	▼1.8
Conservative	Nathan Wilson	4,472	13.1	▼0.6	5,911	17.3	▲3.0
Green					1,951	5.7	▲2.0
Liberal Democrats	Martin Veart	557	1.6	▼1.0	520	1.5	▼0.2
Alba					496	1.5	New
All for Unity					278	0.8	New
Independent Green Voice					254	0.7	New
Scottish Family					228	0.7	New
Scottish Libertarian	Mark Meechan	254	0.7	New	94	0.3	New
Abolish the Scottish Parliament					86	0.3	New
Reform					63	0.2	New
UKIP	Neil Wilson	173	0.5	▲0.5	62	0.2	▼2.2
Freedom Alliance (UK)					62	0.2	New
Independent	Paddy Hogg				49	0.1	New
Communist	Daniel Lambe	194	0.6	New			
Majority		9,437	26.4	▲5.0			
Valid votes		34,149			34,155		
Invalid votes		84			74		
Turnout		34,233	58.9	▲7.7	34,229	58.9	▲7.6
SNP hold		Swing					
Notes

2019

European Election 2019: Scotland
List	Candidates	Votes	Of total (%)	± from prev.
SNP	Alyn Smith (1) Christian Allard (2) Aileen McLeod (5) Margaret Ferrier, Heather Anderson, Alex Kerr	594,533 (198,177.67)	37.8	+8.8
Brexit Party	Louis Stedman-Bryce (3) Karina Walker, James Ferguson-Hannah, Stuart Waiton, Paul Aitken, Calum Walker	233,006	14.8	New
Liberal Democrats	Sheila Ritchie (4) Fred Mackintosh, Catriona Bhatia, Vita Zaporozcenko, John Edward, Clive Sneddon	218,285	13.9	+6.8
Conservative	Nosheena Mobarik (6) Ian McGill, Shona Haslam, Iain Whyte, Andrea Gee, Michael Kusznir	182,476	11.6	−5.6
Labour	David Martin, Jayne Baxter, Craig Miller, Amy Lee Fraioli, Callum O'Dwyer, Angela Bretherton	146,724	9.3	−16.6
Green	Maggie Chapman, Lorna Slater, Gillian Mackay, Chas Booth, Mags Hall, Allan Faulds	129,603	8.2	+0.1
Change UK – The Independent Group	David Macdonald, Kate Forman, Peter Griffiths, Heather Astbury, Colin McFadyen, Cathy Edgeworth	30,004	1.9	New
UKIP	Donald MacKay, Janice MacKay, Otto Inglis, Mark Meechan, Roy Hill	28,418	1.8	−8.7
Independent	Gordon Edgar	6,128	0.39	New
Independent	Ken Parke	2,049	0.13	New
Turnout		1,561,226	39.9	+6.4

== See also ==
- Censorship in the United Kingdom
- Jackie, a Dalmatian taught by its owner to do Nazi salutes and whose owner was investigated by authorities, but charges were dropped for lack of evidence.
- Twitter Joke Trial
