= Scotland (European Parliament constituency) =

Former European Parliament constituency

Scotland Alba
- European Parliament constituency
- Location among the 2014 constituencies
- Member state: United Kingdom
- Created: 1999
- Dissolved: 31 January 2020
- MEPs: 8 (1999–2004); 7 (2004–2009); 6 (2009–2020)

Scotland (Scots: Scotland, Scottish Gaelic: Alba [ˈal̪ˠapə]) was a constituency of the European Parliament created in 1999. It elected between eight and six MEPs using the D'Hondt method of party-list proportional representation every five years from 1999 until 2020. The constituency was abolished after the United Kingdom left the European Union on 31 January 2020.

== Boundaries ==
The constituency's boundaries were the same as those of Scotland, one of the four countries of the United Kingdom.

== History ==
The constituency was formed as a result of the European Parliamentary Elections Act 1999, replacing a number of single-member constituencies. These were Glasgow, Highlands and Islands, Lothians, Mid Scotland and Fife, North East Scotland, South of Scotland, Strathclyde East, and Strathclyde West.

The number of MEPs returned by the constituency was eight in 1999, seven in 2004, and six in 2009, 2014 and 2019.

After the result of the United Kingdom European Union membership referendum vote to leave the European Union in 2016, this constituency was abolished on 31 January 2020 following completion of the Article 50 withdrawal process.

MEPs for former Scottish constituencies, 1979–1999
Election	1979 – 1984	1984 – 1989	1989 – 1994	1994 – 1999	
Highlands and Islands	Winnie Ewing; SNP				
North East Scotland	James Provan; Conservative		Henry McCubbin; Labour	Allan Macartney; SNP to August 1998	Ian Hudghton; SNP from November 1998
South of Scotland	Alasdair Hutton; Conservative		Alex Smith; Labour		
Lothians	Ian Dalziel; Conservative	David Martin; Labour			
Mid Scotland and Fife	John Purvis; Conservative	Alex Falconer; Labour			
Strathclyde West	Adam Fergusson; Conservative	Hugh McMahon; Labour			
Strathclyde East	Ken Collins; Labour				
Glasgow	Janey Buchan; Labour			Bill Miller; Labour	

== Returned members ==
MEPs for Scotland, 1999 onwards
Election	1999 (5th parliament)	2004 (6th parliament)	2009 (7th parliament)	2014 (8th parliament)		2019 (9th parliament)
MEP Party	Struan Stevenson; Conservative			Ian Duncan; Conservative to September 2017	Nosheena Mobarik; Conservative from September 2017	
MEP Party	Elspeth Attwooll; Liberal Democrat		George Lyon; Liberal Democrat	David Coburn; UKIP (2014–2018); Independent (2018–2019); Brexit Party (2019)		Sheila Ritchie; Liberal Democrat
MEP Party	Neil MacCormick; SNP	Alyn Smith; SNP to December 2019				Heather Anderson; SNP in January 2020
MEP Party	Ian Hudghton; SNP					Christian Allard; SNP
MEP Party	David Martin; Labour					Aileen McLeod; SNP
MEP Party	Catherine Stihler; Labour to January 2019				Vacant	Louis Stedman-Bryce; Brexit Party (2019); Independent (2019)
MEP Party	John Purvis; Conservative		Seat abolished			
MEP Party	Bill Miller; Labour	Seat abolished				

== Election results ==
Elected candidates are listed in bold. Brackets indicate the number of votes per seat won.

=== 2019 ===
Map of highest polling party in each Scottish council area; SNP Liberal Democrats

European Election 2019: Scotland
List	Candidates	Votes	Of total (%)	± from prev.
SNP	**Alyn Smith**^{2} (1) **Christian Allard** (2) **Aileen McLeod** (5) Margaret Ferrier, Heather Anderson, Alex Kerr	594,533 (198,177.67)	37.8	+8.8
Brexit Party	**Louis Stedman-Bryce** (3) Karina Walker, James Ferguson-Hannah, Stuart Waiton, Paul Aitken, Calum Walker	233,006	14.8	New
Liberal Democrats	**Sheila Ritchie** (4) Fred Mackintosh, Catriona Bhatia, Vita Zaporozcenko, John Edward, Clive Sneddon	218,285	13.9	+6.8
Conservative	**Nosheena Mobarik** (6) Ian McGill, Shona Haslam, Iain Whyte, Andrea Gee, Michael Kusznir	182,476	11.6	−5.6
Labour	David Martin, Jayne Baxter, Craig Miller, Amy Lee Fraioli, Callum O’Dwyer, Angela Bretherton	146,724	9.3	−16.6
Green	Maggie Chapman, Lorna Slater, Gillian Mackay, Chas Booth, Mags Hall, Allan Faulds	129,603	8.2	+0.1
Change UK – The Independent Group	David Macdonald,^{1} Kate Forman, Peter Griffiths, Heather Astbury, Colin McFadyen, Cathy Edgeworth	30,004	1.9	New
UKIP	Donald MacKay, Janice MacKay, Otto Inglis, Mark Meechan, Roy Hill	28,418	1.8	−8.7
Independent	Gordon Edgar	6,128	0.39	New
Independent	Ken Parke	2,049	0.13	New
Turnout		1,561,226	39.9	+6.4

^{1} On 15 May, David Macdonald, the lead candidate for Change UK in Scotland, switched to endorsing the Liberal Democrats in order not to split the pro-Remain vote.

^{2} Alyn Smith resigned his seat following his election to the Parliament of the United Kingdom in the 2019 United Kingdom general election, alongside Margaret Ferrier. He was replaced by Heather Anderson in January 2020.

=== 2014 ===
Map of highest polling party in each Scottish council area; SNP Labour Conservatives Liberal Democrats

European Election 2014: Scotland
List	Candidates	Votes	Of total (%)	± from prev.
SNP	**Ian Hudghton** (1) **Alyn Smith** (4) Tasmina Ahmed-Sheikh, Stephen Gethins, Toni Giugliano, Chris Stephens	389,503 (194,751.5)	29.0	−0.1
Labour	**David Martin** (2) **Catherine Stihler** (5) Derek Munn, Katrina Murray, Asim Khan, Kirsty O'Brien	348,219 (174,109.5)	25.9	+5.1
Conservative	**Ian Duncan**† (3) Belinda Don, Nosheena Mobarik, Jamie Gardiner, Iain McGill, Stuart Mcintyre	231,330	17.2	+0.4
UKIP	**David Coburn** (6) Kevin Newton, Otto Inglis, Denise Baykal, Hugh Hatrick, Malcolm Mackay	140,534	10.5	+5.3
Green	Maggie Chapman, Chas Booth, Grace Murray, Alastair Whitelaw, Anne Thomas, Steen Parish	108,305	8.1	+0.8
Liberal Democrats	George Lyon, Christine Jardine, Lisa Strachan, Richard Brodie, Jade Holden, Euan Davidson	95,319	7.1	−4.4
Britain First	James Dowson, John Arthur Randall, Jayda Kaleigh Fransen, Geoffrey Clynch, Margaret Dorothy Clynch, Jane Susan Shepherd	13,639	1.0	New
BNP	Kenneth McDonald, David James Orr, Victoria McKenzie, Angus Jim Mathys, Paul Brandy Stafford, Stacey Jayne Fleming	10,216	0.8	−1.7
NO2EU	John Odell Foster, Andrew Elliott, Murdo Maclean, Gail Morrow, Brian Smith, Richard Edward Veitch	6,418	0.5	−0.4
Turnout		1,343,483	33.5	+5.0

† Ian Duncan resigned his seat in September 2017, to take up a seat in the House of Lords and be appointed as Under-Secretary of State for Scotland. He was replaced by Nosheena Mobarik later in the month.

=== 2009 ===
Map of the highest polling parties in each Scottish council area; SNP Labour Conservatives Liberal Democrats

European Election 2009: Scotland
List	Candidates	Votes	Of total (%)	± from prev.
SNP	**Ian Hudghton** (1) **Alyn Smith** (4) Aileen McLeod, Drew Hendry, Duncan Ross, Gordon Archer	321,007 (160,503.5)	29.1	+9.4
Labour	**David Martin** (2) **Catherine Stihler** (6) Mary Lockhart, Paul McAleavely, Kirsty Connell, Nasim Khan	229,853 (114,926.5)	20.8	−5.6
Conservative	**Struan Stevenson** (3) Belinda Don, Helen Gardiner, Donald G. MacDonald, Gerald Michaluk, PJ Lewis	185,794	16.8	−1.0
Liberal Democrats	**George Lyon** (5) Euan Robson, Robert Aldridge, Patsy Kenton, Douglas Herbison, Clive Sneddon	127,038	11.5	−1.6
Green	Elaine Morrison, Chas Booth, Kirsten Robb, Alastair Whitelaw, Ruth Dawkins, Peter McColl	80,442	7.3	+0.5
UKIP	Peter Adams, Paul Hencke, Phillip Anderson, Matthew Desmond, Donald Mackay, Paul Wiffen, Kathleen Desmond	57,788	5.2	−1.5
BNP	Gary Raikes, Charlie Baillie, Deborah McKnight, Roy Jones, Max Dunbar, Elise Jones	27,174	2.5	+0.8
Socialist Labour	Louise McDaid, David Jacobsen, Katherine McGavigan, James Berrington, Claire Watt, James McDaid	22,135	2.0	New
Scottish Christian	Sheila McLaughlan, John Smart, Brian Ross, Archie Linnegan, Christine Cormack, Isobel Anne Macleod	16,738	1.5	−0.3
Scottish Socialist	Colin Fox, Angela Gorrie, Johanna Dind, Nick McKerrell, Raphie de Santos, Felicity Garvie	10,404	0.9	−4.3
Independent	Duncan Robertson	10,189	0.9	New
NO2EU	John Foster, Tommy Sheridan, Leah Ganley, Stuart Hyslop, Ajit Singh Uppal, Tom Morrison	9,693	0.9	+0.9
Jury Team	Alan Wallace, John O'Callaghan, Stuart Brown, Kenneth Lees, Mev Brown, Austin Compson-Bradford	6,257	0.6	New
Turnout		1,104,512	28.5	−2.4

=== 2004 ===
Map of the highest polling parties in each Scottish Westminster constituency; SNP in yellow, Labour in red, Conservatives in blue, and Liberal Democrats in orange.

European Election 2004: Scotland
List	Candidates	Votes	Of total (%)	± from prev.
Labour	**David Martin** (1) **Catherine Stihler** (4) Bill Miller, Kirsty O'Brien, Colin Smyth, Catriona Renton, Gemma Doyle	310,865 (155,432.5)	26.4	−2.3
SNP	**Ian Hudghton** (2) **Alyn Smith** (6) Kenneth Gibson, Douglas Henderson, Alexander Nicholson, Alex Orr, Janet Law, Duncan Ross	231,505 (115,752.5)	19.7	−7.5
Conservative	**Struan Stevenson** (3) **John Purvis** (7) Cameron Buchanan, Sebastian Leslie, Anne Harper, Paul Nelson, Douglas Taylor	209,028 (104,514)	17.8	−2.0
Liberal Democrats	**Elspeth Attwooll** (5) Robert Aldridge, Alex Bruce, Karen Freel, Douglas Herbison, Clive Sneddon, Christine James, Jermaine Allison	154,178	13.1	+3.3
Green	Chas Booth, Tara O'Leary, Martin Bartos, Moira Dunworth, Alastair Whitelaw, Katherine Joester, James Park	79,695	6.8	+1.0
UKIP	Peter Troy, Philip Anderson, George Cormack, Michael Phillips, Janice Murdock, Donald Mackay, Peter Nielson	78,828	6.7	+5.4
Scottish Socialist	Felicity Garvie, Nick McKerrel, Hugh Kerr, Catriona Grant, Lynn Sheridan, John Sangster, Andrew Rossiter	61,356	5.2	+1.2
Christian Vote	George Hargreaves, William Thompson, Richard Russell, David Braid, Marion McNeill, Mary Hay, Rose Irtwange	21,056	1.8	New
BNP	Steven Blake, Scott McLean, David Kerr, Stephen Burns, Bryan Dickson, Craig McComb, John Bean	19,427	1.7	+1.3
Scottish Wind Watch	Brendan Hamill, Sylvia Thorne, Charles Bennie, Jennifer Scobie, Bennie Palmer, Helen Pass, Richard Hammock	7,255	0.6	New
Independent	Fergus Tait	3,624	0.3	New
Turnout		1,176,817	30.9	+6.2

=== 1999 ===
Map of the highest polling parties in each Scottish Westminster constituency; SNP in yellow, Labour in red, Conservatives in blue, and Liberal Democrats in orange.

European Election 1999: Scotland
List	Candidates	Votes	Of total (%)	± from prev.
Labour	**David Martin** (1) **Bill Miller** (4) **Catherine Taylor** (8) Christine May, Hugh McMahon, James Paton, John Clifford, Jeanette Bradley	283,490 (94,496.67)	28.7	
SNP	**Ian Hudghton** (2) **Neil MacCormick** (5) Anne Gillies, Gordon Wilson, Janet Law, Kris Browne, Ian Goldie, Josephine Docherty	268,528 (134,264)	27.2	
Conservative	**Struan Stevenson** (3) **John Purvis** (6) Anne Harper, Cameron Buchanan, Sebastian Leslie, Iain Mitchell, Peter Ramsay, Anthony Gilbey	195,296 (97,648)	19.8	
Liberal Democrats	**Elspeth Attwooll** (7) Robert Aldridge, Neil Mitchison, Heather Lyall, Clive Sneddon, Danus Skene, Karen Freel, Jayne Struthers	96,971	9.8	
Green	Marion Coyne, Eleanor Scott, Phil O'Brien, Graeme Farmer, Linda Hendry, Chris Ballance, Kay Allan, Alastair Whitelaw	57,142	5.8	
Scottish Socialist	Hugh Kerr, Rosie Kane, Harvey Duke, Catherine Stewart, Colin Fox, Shareen Blackall, Steve Arnott, Frances Curran	39,720	4.0	
Pro-Euro Conservative	Paul Dwyer, Joanna Lavender, Douglas McConchie, Richard Ashurst, Neasa MacEarlean, Oliver Grant, Alexander Skinner, James Waters	17,781	1.8	
UKIP	Alistair McConnachie, Donald Mackay, James McKenna, Stuart Brown, Matthew Henderson, Joseph Smith, Peter Nielson, John Mumford	12,459	1.3	
Socialist Labour	Louise McDaid, Christopher Herriot, Katharine McGavigan, Stephen Mayes, Patricia Graham, Colin Turbett, Margaret Stead, James Galloway	9,385	1.0	
BNP	Kenneth Smith, Scott McLean, Russell Bradley, Mark Allen, Paul Wilkinson, Robert Currie, David Kerr, James Mills	3,729	0.4	
Natural Law	James McKissock, George Stidolph, Diana Kras, Kenneth Blair, David Pettigrew, Iain Petrie, Anna Rawlinson, Thomas Pringle	2,087	0.2	
Accountant for Lower Scottish Taxes	Charles Lawson	1,632	0.2	
Turnout		988,310	24.7	

== See also ==
- Elections in Scotland
