= Lorraine Davidson =

British journalist

- Occupation: Journalist
- Employer(s): BBC, STV, The Times
- Spouse: David Martin
- Children: 2

Lorraine Davidson is a Chief Executive, former civil servant and TV journalist.

She has worked as an STV and BBC political correspondent, and was appointed by Tony Blair as Director of Communication for the Scottish Labour Party in the run up to the first elections to the Scottish Parliament.

== Career ==
Davidson was STV's Westminster correspondent until she joined the BBC's political unit in 1997.

In May 1998, she became Director of Communications for the Scottish Labour Party, under leader Donald Dewar, two weeks after Paul McKinney unexpectedly quit. She served until July 1999. She later wrote a biography of First Minister and Scottish Labour leader Jack McConnell.

Davidson was also the Brussels based Europe Correspondent and the Scottish Political Editor at the Daily Mirror and a political correspondent for The Times.

She was appointed Chief Executive of The Scottish Council of Independent Schools in July 2023. after serving as Head of Education Strategy at the Scottish Government She is a former Head of European Engagement and Head of Vaccine Oversight at the Scottish Government and ex Head of Communications at the Crown Office and Procurator Fiscal Service

== Personal life ==
She is married to David Martin, former Vice President and Member of the European Parliament for Scotland co-convener of the Citizens' Assembly of Scotland and President of the European Movement in Scotland.
