= Mid Scotland and Fife =

Mid Scotland and Fife may refer to:

- Mid Scotland and Fife (European Parliament constituency)
- Mid Scotland and Fife (Scottish Parliament electoral region)
