= John Purvis (politician) =

British politician (1938–2022)

John Purvis CBE
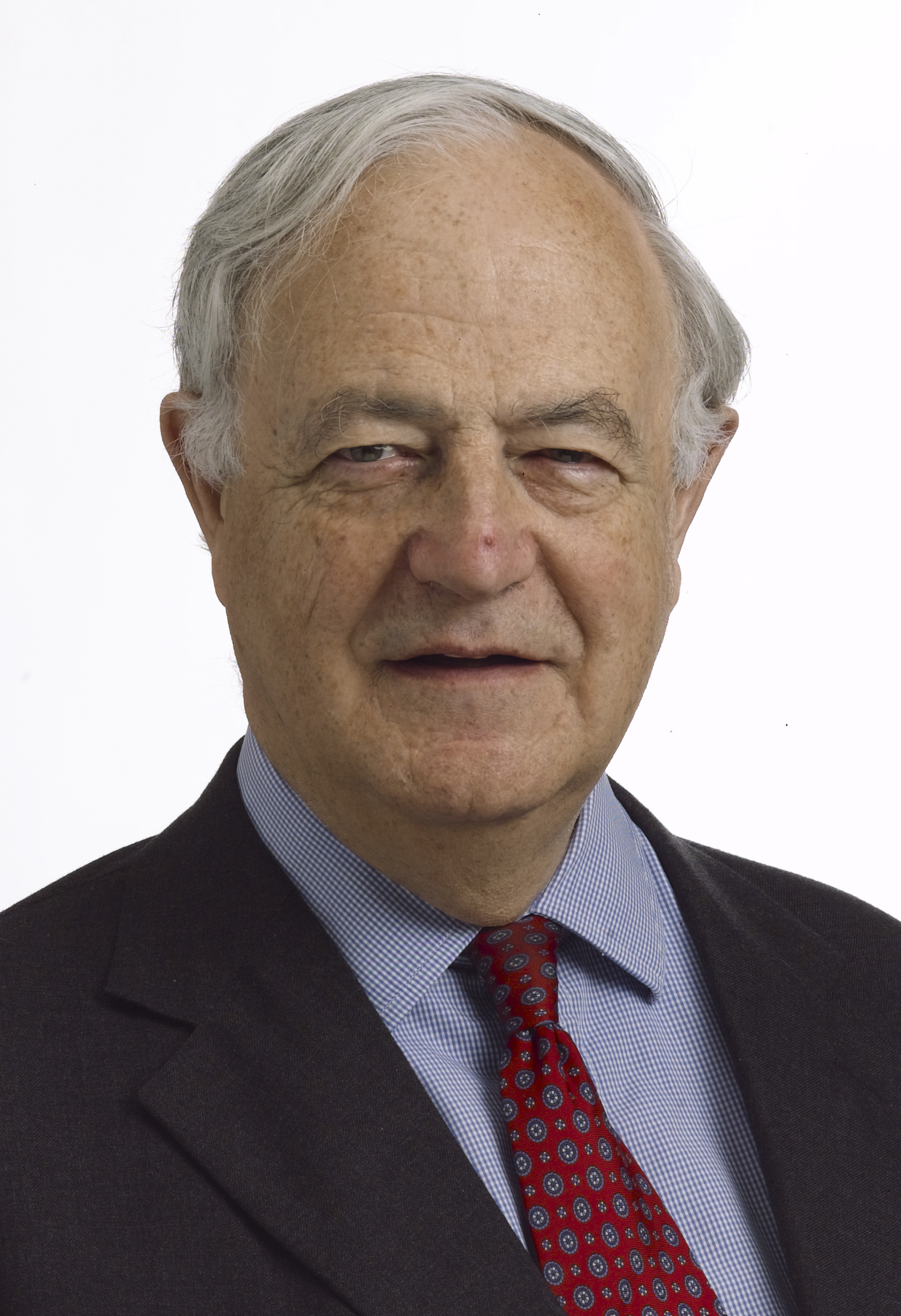

Member of the European Parliament for Scotland
- In office 10 June 1999 – 4 June 2009

Member of the European Parliament for Mid Scotland and Fife
- In office 7 June 1979 – 14 June 1984
- Preceded by: Office Created
- Succeeded by: Alex Falconer

Personal details
- Born: John Robert Purvis; 6 July 1938 St Andrews, Fife, Scotland
- Died: 20 March 2022 (aged 83)
- Party: Conservative
- Education: University of St Andrews
- Occupation: Banker

John Robert Purvis, CBE (6 July 1938 – 20 March 2022) was a Conservative MEP for Mid Scotland and Fife (1979–1984) and for Scotland from 1999 to 2009 was one of Scotland's seven MEPs.

== Biography ==
Purvis was married with three children and ten grandchildren. He had farming and property interests in North East Fife and had extensive knowledge of the international financial services industry, having worked in the sector for several decades and having later contributed his expertise on relevant committees in the European Parliament.

Purvis served as a second lieutenant in the Scots Guards (1956–1958) and graduated MA (Hons) from the University of St Andrews (1962). He worked for First National City Bank in London, New York and Milan (1962–1969) and was Treasurer of merchant bank Noble Grossart Ltd in Edinburgh (1969–1973). He was Managing Director and Chairman of Gilmerton Management Services Ltd St Andrews (1973–1986) and Chairman of the Economic Affairs Committee of the Scottish Conservative and Unionist Party (1986–1997). He received the CBE in 1990.

In his first term he was appointed to the new Internal Market subcommittee of the Economic and Monetary Affairs Committee. In this capacity he worked with fellow UK MEP Basil de Ferranti and others to propose harmonised standards across a wide range of goods. Their final proposals would form the basis of the Single European Act in 1985.

During his second term as an MEP, Purvis was elected Vice Chairman of the European Parliament's Economic and Monetary Affairs Committee in 2002, and then re-elected to this position during his third term in 2005 and 2007 (2002–2009). He was also a member of the Committee on Industry, Research and Energy (1999–2009). He also served on EU delegations to the Gulf States and to Middle Eastern countries and served on the EU Committee of Inquiry into the Equitable Life Assurance Society crisis. During his 15 years as an MEP, Purvis produced a number of major reports which helped to shape EU policy – notably on biotechnology (supporting GM foods), telecommunications and financial regulation.

In 2001, Purvis spoke out against the legality of actions by Customs and Excise officers who were confiscating alcohol and tobacco bought for personal use from travellers returning from the European Union saying such actions were illegal. In 2002, Purvis stated that he supported the building of a new airport in central Scotland as an alternative to upgrading the airports at Edinburgh or Glasgow.

In 2008, it was alleged that Purvis may have breached rules regarding parliamentary expenses and the payment of staff through a company. Purvis said at the time that he sought clarification from the relevant authorities and such clarification was not forthcoming. He was cleared of any wrongdoing.

Since standing down in 2009, Purvis continued to serve in Europe as Chairman of Financial Future Forum which provides a means of dialogue between the financial services industries of Europe and the EU's legislators. He was also Chairman of Belgrave Capital Management in London, and was for many years a Director of Kingdom FM Radio Ltd., Fife, and Advisor to the Board of Elmwood College in Cupar (2012).

He died following a battle with cancer on 20 March 2022, at the age of 83.

European Parliament
| New district | Member of the European Parliament for Mid Scotland & Fife; 1979 – 1984 | Succeeded by Alex Falconer |
