= Catherine Stihler =

Scottish politician and CEO

Catherine Stihler OBE FRSE
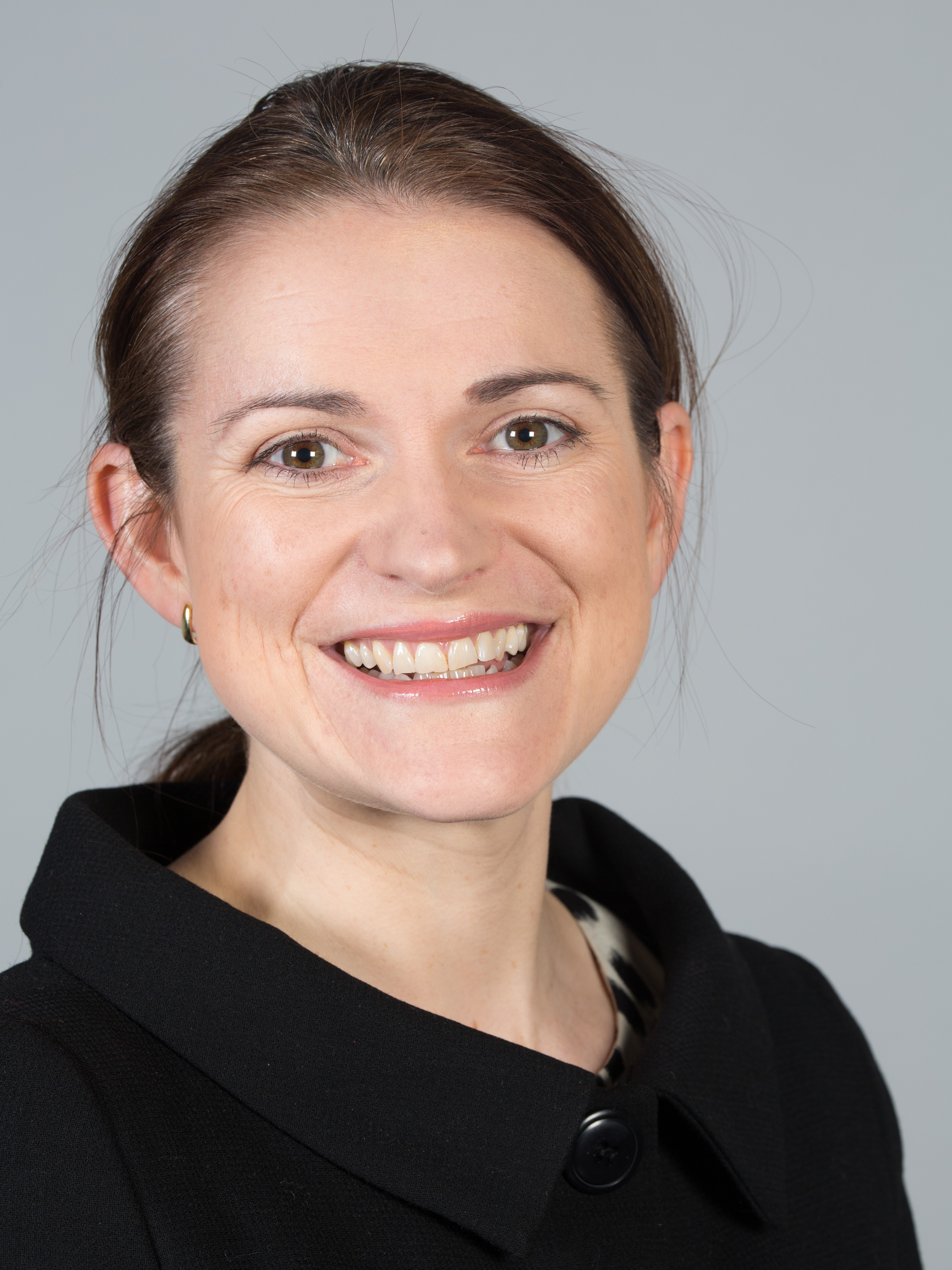
- Stihler in 2014

Member of the European Parliament for Scotland
- In office 10 June 1999 – 31 January 2019
- Preceded by: Constituency established
- Succeeded by: Louis Stedman-Bryce

Lord Rector of the University of St Andrews
- In office October 2014 – October 2017
- Preceded by: Alistair Moffat
- Succeeded by: Srđa Popović

Personal details
- Born: 30 July 1973 (age 53) Bellshill, North Lanarkshire, Scotland, UK
- Party: Labour
- Spouse: David
- Education: University of St Andrews
- Profession: CEO of Creative Commons (2020-2024)

Catherine Dalling Taylor Stihler OBE FRSE (née Taylor; born 30 July 1973) is a Scottish former politician who was chief executive officer (CEO) of Creative Commons from 2020 to 2023. A member of the Scottish Labour Party, she was a Member of the European Parliament (MEP) for Scotland from 1999 to 2019.

In October 2014, she was elected as the 52nd rector of the University of St Andrews, the second woman to hold that post.

After leaving the European Parliament, she was CEO of non-profit organisation Open Knowledge Foundation and from August 2020 to January 2024 CEO of Creative Commons.

== Early and personal life ==
Stihler was educated at Coltness High School, later going to the University of St Andrews, where she gained an MA with joint honours in International Relations and Geography and a postgraduate MLitt in International Security Studies. In 2018, she received an honorary Doctorate (D. Litt) from the University of St. Andrews.

Stihler was appointed Officer of the Order of the British Empire (OBE) in the 2019 Birthday Honours.

In 2022, she was elected Fellow of the Royal Society of Edinburgh.

== Political career ==
Whilst a student at St Andrews, she was elected president of the Students' Association, from 1994–95. She also was on the Scottish Executive Committee of the Labour Party from 1993–95 and was the Young Labour delegate to the National Executive Committee from 1995–97. Whilst a postgraduate student, she stood at the Angus constituency at the 1997 general election. She was not elected however, and finished in third place, behind Sebastian A.A. Leslie of the Conservatives and Andrew Welsh of the Scottish National Party.

Stihler worked for Anne Begg, Member of Parliament for Aberdeen South, as a researcher. She was placed at third on the Labour Party list for Scotland in the 1999 European Parliament election, and therefore took the third Labour Party seat under the d'Hondt electoral system becoming the UK's youngest MEP at the age of 25.

Stihler was re-elected as an MEP for Scotland in 2004 and 2009. She was the unsuccessful Labour candidate in the 2006 Dunfermline and West Fife by-election, coming second with 30.6% of the vote. She served as the Deputy Leader of the EPLP and held positions as Labour's Euro spokesperson on health and fisheries. Stihler was Labour's Euro-Spokesperson on Consumer Rights and was the only Scottish MEP on the economic and monetary affairs committee.

She supported Owen Smith in the 2016 Labour Party (UK) leadership election.

She resigned as an MEP on 31 January 2019, to take up a new role. Her seat was left vacant and not filled by the Scottish Labour Party due to the UK's [then] impending exit from The EU on 29 March 2019.

== Later career ==
In November 2018, Stihler was appointed as the new Chief Executive Officer of Open Knowledge Foundation. She stood down as an MEP on 31 January 2019 to take up the role in February 2019. On 9 July 2020, Creative Commons announced she would be the new CEO with a starting date of 17 August 2020. Stihler left her role at the end of December 2023.

Academic offices
Preceded by Alistair Moffat	Rector of the University of St Andrews; 2014—2017	Succeeded by Srđa Popović
Party political offices
Preceded by Claire Ward	Young Labour representative on the National Executive Committee of the Labour Party; 1995–1997	Succeeded by Sarah Ward
