= Jackie (dog) =

Finnish dog

Tor Borg and his dog Jackie. The dog had been trained to react to the command "Hitler" by raising a paw.

Jackie was a black-and-white spotted dog, a Dalmatian mix, that became known for the political incident it caused between its owner, Tor Borg, Borg's company, and Nazi Germany.

Borg was a Finnish businessman from Tampere who became head of what is now Tamro Group, which had been co-founded by his father. Jackie was trained to raise a single paw whenever the name "Hitler" was mentioned, appearing to emulate the Nazi salute. In 1941, shortly before the invasion of the Soviet Union provoked the Continuation War, an anonymous source notified Nazi authorities of Borg and Jackie.

The report of Jackie's actions set into motion a series of documents and diplomatic cables between the German Foreign Office, Economy Ministry, Nazi Party Chancellery and German diplomats in Finland. In an exchange dated 29 January 1941, German Vice Consul Willy Erkelenz in Helsinki wrote that "a witness, who does not want to be named, said he saw and heard how Borg's dog reacted to the command 'Hitler' by raising its paw". Upon hearing of the situation, Borg became worried, as his company relied on German suppliers; his wife, Josefine, was a known anti-Nazi German.

Borg was summoned to the German Embassy in Helsinki where he admitted that on a few occasions his wife called the dog "Hitler" and that on a few occasions it did respond with a raised paw. However, he claimed the incident in question had occurred earlier, telling Nazi officials: "The rumor might emanate from an episode in the summer of 1933 which happened within my family only and which had no ulterior political background whatsoever." He denied that his family or Jackie had done anything "that could be seen as an insult against the German Reich".

Embassy officials were skeptical of the explanation, noting in communications with Berlin that "Borg, even though he claims otherwise, is not telling the truth." The Foreign Office spent three months investigating ways of bringing Borg to trial for insulting Hitler, but no witnesses would come forward. Finally, in March 1941, the Chancellory decided that "considering that the circumstances could not be solved completely, it is not necessary to press charges." Meanwhile, the Third Reich attempted to economically sabotage Borg's company, including trying to get IG Farben to stop supplying it. It is unclear if Adolf Hitler had ever been aware or had any say in the incident.

"The dog affair tells us the Nazis were not only criminals and mass murderers, they were silly as hell. There are very few things you can laugh about because what they did was so monstrous. But there were two or three dozen people discussing the affair of the dog rather than preparing for the invasion of the Soviet Union. They were crazy."
— Journalist Klaus Hillenbrand on the absurdity of the Nazi effort regarding Jackie.

The incident was uncovered by historian and author Klaus Hillenbrand, who discovered the story while researching Nazi era activities in the German federal archive. Johannes Tuchel, head of the Memorial to the German Resistance, noted that "This case shows that National Socialism was striving to dominate all spheres of public life and all areas that it could influence. And that went as far as to this rather bizarre case of this dog."

Jackie died of natural causes. Borg died in 1959 at age 60; Josefine died in 1971. The company, which had been recently renamed Tampereen Rohdoskauppa Oy and later renamed Tamro Group, expanded during the war years into a national wholesale business and supplied pharmaceuticals throughout Finland's wars of the period. Tamro became a leading wholesale pharmaceutical company in Scandinavia.

== See also ==
- Mark Meechan – Scotsman convicted in 2018 for teaching his girlfriend's dog to do a Nazi salute as a joke
- List of individual dogs
