= David Coburn (politician) =

Scottish politician and businessman (born 1959)

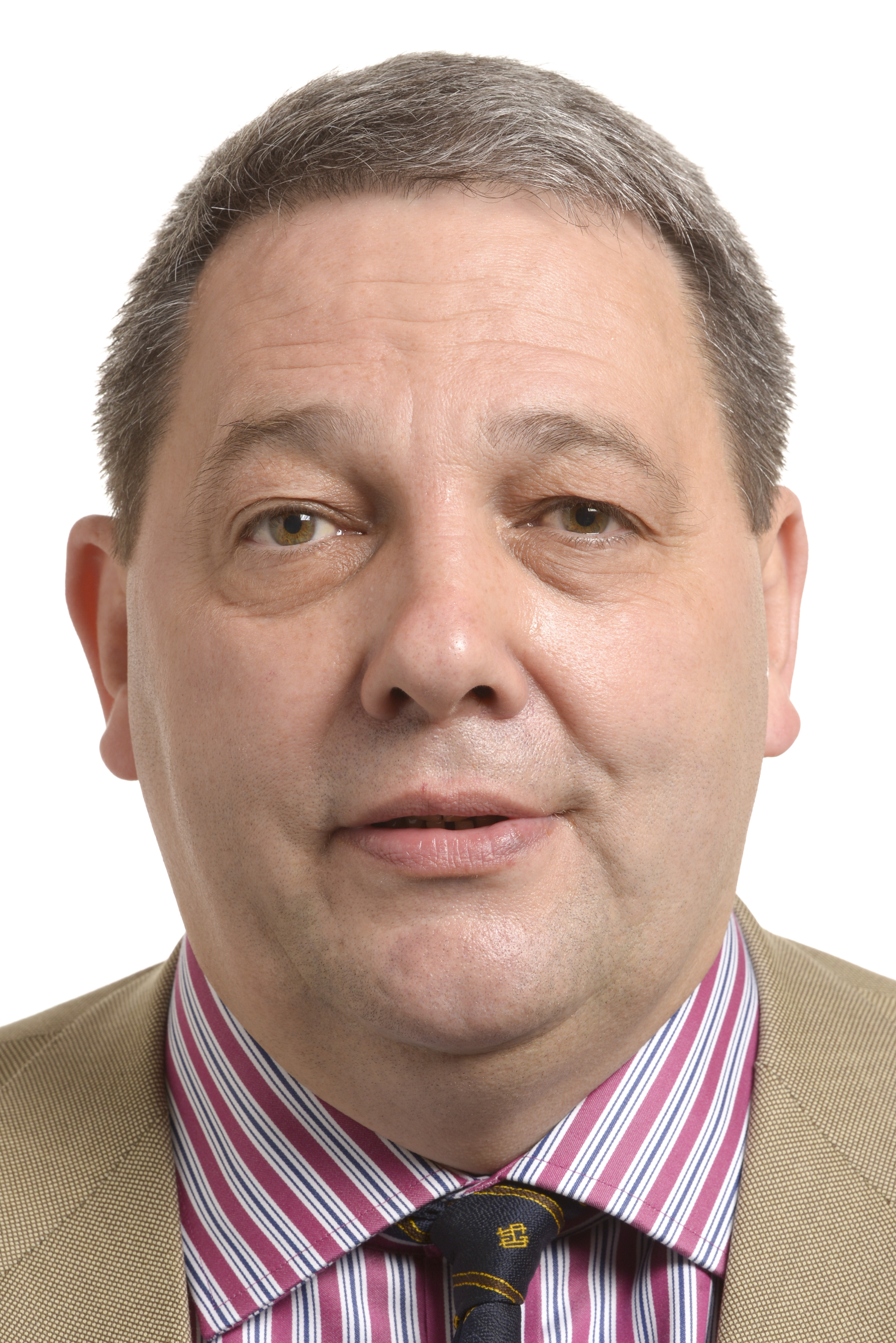

Leader of UKIP Scotland
- In office 1 July 2014 – 6 December 2018
- Preceded by: The Viscount Monckton of Brenchley
- Succeeded by: Donald MacKay

Member of the European Parliament for Scotland
- In office 1 July 2014 – 1 July 2019
- Preceded by: George Lyon
- Succeeded by: Sheila Ritchie

Personal details
- Born: David Adam Coburn; 11 February 1959 (age 67) Glasgow, Scotland
- Party: Brexit Party (2019–2020); Independent (2018–2019); UKIP (2008–2018)
- Education: University of Leeds

David Adam Coburn (born 11 February 1959) is a Scottish politician and businessman who served as a Member of the European Parliament (MEP) for Scotland from 2014 to 2019. A former member of the UK Independence Party (UKIP), Coburn was the leader of UKIP Scotland from July 2014 until December 2018.

He joined the Brexit Party in 2019, and stood down as an MEP before the 2019 European Parliament election.

== Early life and career ==
Coburn was born in Glasgow and educated at The High School of Glasgow after which he studied law at the University of Leeds but failed to graduate with a degree. He then worked as an art dealer and City of London financial trader before owning a freight company.

== Political career ==
Coburn contested the South-east London constituency of Old Bexley and Sidcup in 2010, and finished in fifth place with 1,532 votes. He also stood in Bexley and Bromley at the 2012 London Assembly election, finishing in fourth place. Coburn ran and was successful in the 2014 European Parliament election to become a Member of the European Parliament for the Scotland constituency, as a member of UKIP Scotland.

At the end of 2013, UKIP Scotland was dissolved after infighting tore the regional party apart; the party's administrative body was dissolved, Mike Scott-Hayward (the chairman and chief fundraiser) quit, and UKIP leader Nigel Farage fired Lord Christopher Monckton via email. The main party as a whole, and UKIP Scotland focused on supporting the candidates for the upcoming European elections. After Coburn won the seat, he was appointed leader of UKIP Scotland.

According to SNP candidate Tasmina Ahmed-Sheikh, Coburn repeatedly muddled her name at hustings during the European election campaign, when she was standing against him, referring to her as "Pashmina, Jasmine and Tamzin before eventually settling on a combination of 'love', 'dear' and 'honey'." UKIP's Scottish chairman Arthur (Misty) Thackeray responded by saying "How humourless and thin-skinned are these people trying to make faux outrage stories about a slip of the tongue over a name? ... It wasn't mispronounced throughout the entire Euro campaign. It was mispronounced once; if memory serves me correctly, David called her Jasmina."

In 2014 after his MEP election, Coburn stated his priorities were decriminalising drugs, opposing same-sex marriage, restricting immigration, bringing public awareness to bad EU policies, and withdrawing the UK from the EU. He affirmed his desire for Scotland to stay within the United Kingdom.

In 2015, Coburn compared Scottish government minister Humza Yousaf to the convicted terrorist Abu Hamza, later apologising and calling it a "joke". The then UKIP leader Nigel Farage called it a "joke in bad taste" and the then President of the European Parliament, Martin Schulz, stated that whereas the remarks were "not worthy of any elected member", he could not act on remarks made outside parliament. Parliamentary candidate Tim Wilson quit the party in response, saying he had been "systematically gagged by the party whip and forbidden to speak about Islam favourably".

In April 2015, a Wikipedia account operated by Coburn's office was blocked indefinitely for edit warring over Coburn's Wikipedia article. Coburn claimed he had directed one of his staff to make the changes in order to clear the page of "garbage" and "nonsense"; some news outlets attribute those edits to Coburn himself.

In the 2015 general election, Coburn stood for the Falkirk constituency. During the campaign, he came out in favour of Fracking in the area, in the face of local concerns. He won 3.0% of the vote.

UKIP contested the 2016 Scottish Parliament election, standing list-only candidates in the eight electoral regions. Coburn, himself, was UKIP's lead candidate for the Highlands and Islands region. During the campaign, Coburn was accused of 'hand-picking' candidates for the different regions. He denied this, claiming that UKIP's director, Paul Oakden, would be selecting candidates instead. Oakden disputed this, telling members in a leaked email that: "“The NEC, who will ultimately decide the final lists have determined that the UKIP Leader in Scotland should devise a list, including candidate rankings for each region of Scotland.” Ultimately, the party was unsuccessful in securing any seats, receiving 2% of list votes in total. In Coburn's own region, UKIP polled 5,344 votes (2.6%), finishing sixth.

In July 2016, Coburn declared his support for Steven Woolfe in UKIP's leadership election to replace Nigel Farage.

In the 2017 general election, Coburn unsuccessfully ran for Kirkcaldy and Cowdenbeath, securing just 1.2% of the vote and losing his deposit in the race.

On 7 December 2018, Coburn quit UKIP and became an independent MEP. He joined the Brexit Party in February 2019 but did not seek re-election in the 2019 European Parliament election and stood down as an MEP on 1 July 2019 prior to the conclusion of the UK formally withdrawing from the EU. Following the 2019 general election, Coburn applied to join the Scottish Conservatives but was rejected on the instruction of party leader Jackson Carlaw.

Coburn's name appeared in documents presented during the trial of Nathan Gill, former MEP and Brexit Party leader in Wales. WhatsApp messages between Gill and suspected Russian security service members show Oleg Voloshyn, a pro-Russian former member of the Ukrainian parliament, discussing money apparently set aside for a person referred to as "David" while he was bribing Gill. The messages stated that "David" was a member of the 112 Ukraine editorial board: Coburn was the only known board member of that name. Coburn denied he had ever been paid to speak favourably about Russia, and the BBC analysed that it had "not seen evidence" that Coburn had received any bribes.

== Personal life ==
Coburn is gay and was UKIP's second openly gay MEP, after Nikki Sinclaire. When the results of the 2014 European Parliament elections were declared, his permanent address was listed as Kensington, London. During the campaign he lived in a rented property in Edinburgh.

As of November 2025, Coburn was living in France.
