= Jonathan Caine, Baron Caine =

British political advisor and peer (born 1966)

The Right Honourable The Lord Caine
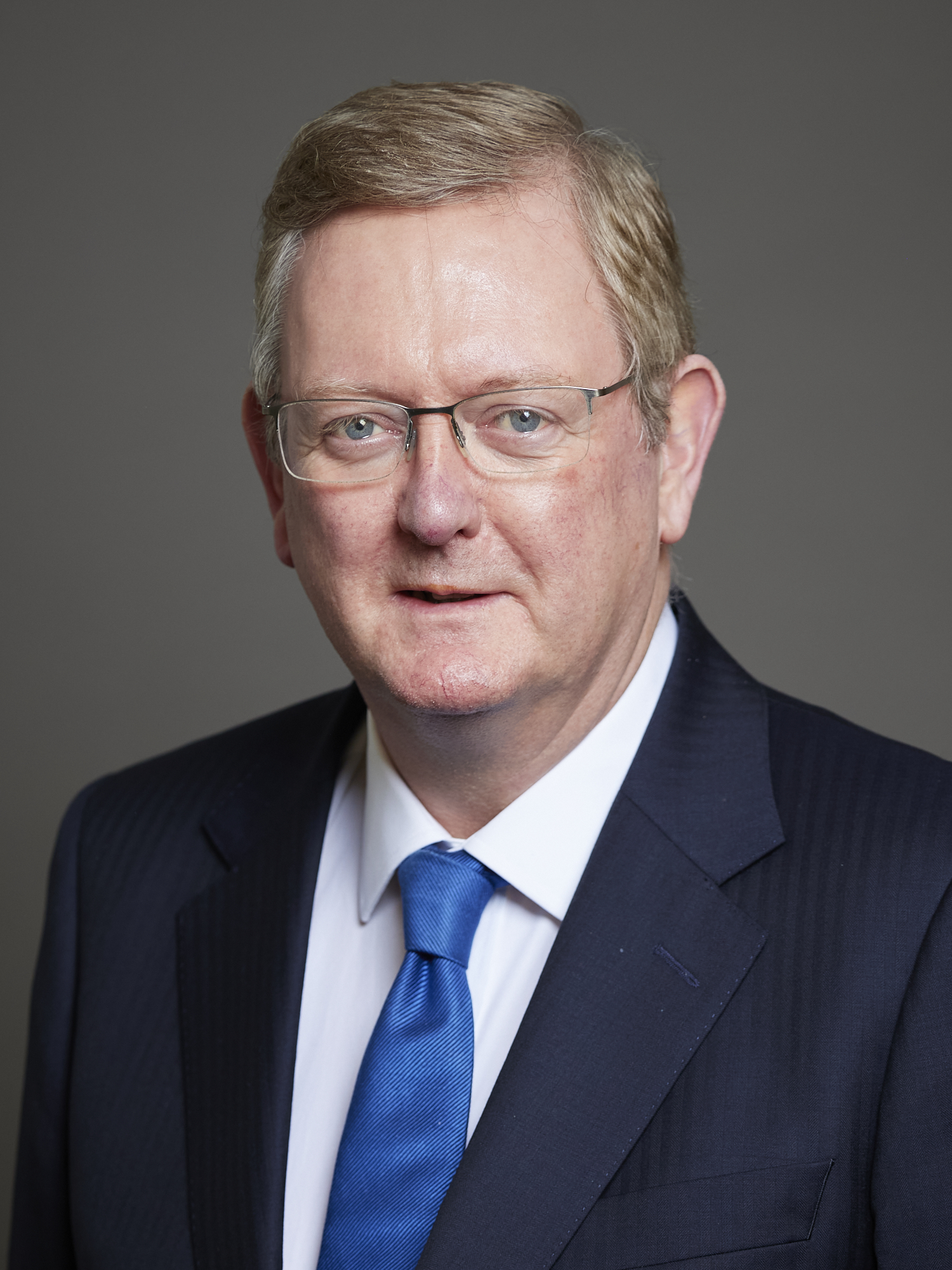
- Official portrait, 2023

Shadow Minister for Northern Ireland
- Incumbent
- Assumed office 1 September 2024
- Leader: Rishi Sunak; Kemi Badenoch

Lord-in-waiting Government Whip
- In office 24 November 2022 – 5 July 2024
- Prime Minister: Rishi Sunak

Parliamentary Under-Secretary of State for Northern Ireland
- In office 5 November 2021 – 5 July 2024
- Prime Minister: Boris Johnson; Liz Truss; Rishi Sunak
- Preceded by: The Lord Duncan of Springbank (2020)
- Succeeded by: Fleur Anderson

Member of the House of Lords
- Lord Temporal
- Life peerage 2 September 2016

Personal details
- Born: Jonathan Michael Caine; 1966 (age 59–60) Leeds, West Yorkshire, England
- Party: Conservative
- Education: Temple Moor High School
- Alma mater: University of Leicester (BA)

Jonathan Michael Caine, Baron Caine (born 1966) is a British Member of the House of Lords and a former political aide (or "SPAD") who served six Secretaries of State.

== Education and career ==
Caine grew up in Leeds in the 1970s, and was educated at Templenewsam Halton Primary and Halton Middle School, then Temple Moor High School. He studied history at the University of Leicester, where his specialism was the Conservative Party 1902-1940 which included the Home Rule Crisis 1912-14 and the Anglo-Irish Treaty 1921.

He joined the Conservative Research Department (CRD) in 1987, working in the office next to David Cameron's. He joined the party's Northern Ireland desk in 1988, and by 1991 was a special adviser at the Northern Ireland Office until 1995 – rejoining it in 2010.

In 2008, Caine stated that he was a Director at Bell Pottinger Public Affairs.

In 2014, Caine worked as special adviser to Theresa Villiers, being described in the press as her "right-hand man". Caine had also worked for Owen Paterson, and was described by him as "one of the foremost experts on Northern Ireland". However, a senior member of the SDLP noted that, although he understood Unionism in Ireland, he had no real understanding of Irish republicanism, and no sympathy for it.

As of 2016, Caine had worked for Tom King, Peter Brooke, Patrick Mayhew, Owen Paterson, Theresa Villiers and James Brokenshire.

Jonathan Caine has been described as "one of the most quietly brilliant Westminster strategists, whose knowledge of Northern Ireland is formidable." In his memoir, For The Record, former Prime Minister David Cameron is quoted in The Yorkshire Post as crediting Caine with being "an authority in his field and a tireless behind-the-scenes presence. He was – and remains – passionate about securing peace... in Northern Ireland, and maintaining our United Kingdom."

He was nominated for a life peerage as part of David Cameron's Resignation Honours list and was created Baron Caine, of Temple Newsam in the City of Leeds, on 2 September 2016.

On 5 November 2021, Caine was appointed as a Parliamentary Under-Secretary of State at the Northern Ireland Office. On 24 November 2022, he was appointed as a whip (Lord-in-waiting) in addition to his role the NIO. On 1 September 2024, he was appointed Shadow Minister for Northern Ireland.

== Personal life ==
Caine supports Yorkshire County Cricket Club and Leeds Rhinos, and enjoys listening to Led Zeppelin. He was a longstanding friend of David Trimble. He is unmarried.

Orders of precedence in the United Kingdom
Preceded by The Lord Kirkhope of Harrogate	Gentlemen; Baron Caine	Followed by The Lord Macpherson of Earl's Court
