= Temple Moor High School =

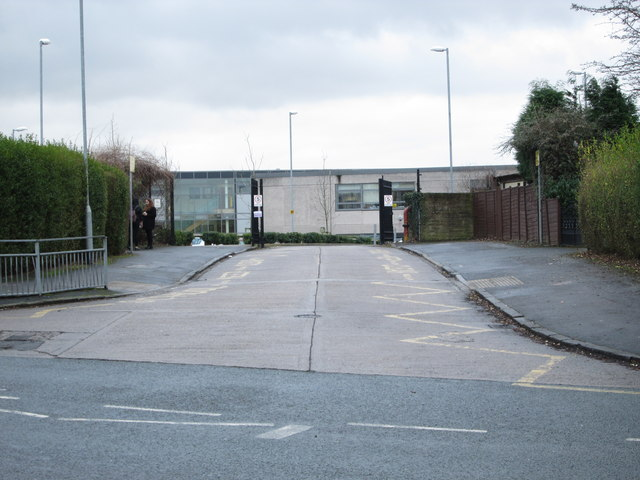
- Entrance in Field End Grove

Location
- Field End Grove; Selby Road; Leeds, West Yorkshire, LS15 0PT; England; 53.79654°N 1.46139°W

Information
- Type: Academy
- Motto: "Novae mentis templa colimus"
- Established: 1956
- Local authority: City of Leeds
- Trust: Red Kite Learning Trust
- Department for Education URN: 146247 Tables
- Ofsted: Reports
- Head Master: Matthew West
- Gender: Coeducational
- Age: 11 to 18
- Enrolment: 1,283
- Publication: Tempo (School Magazine/Newsletter)
- Website: https://tmhs.co.uk/

Temple Moor High School is a coeducational secondary school and sixth form located in Leeds, West Yorkshire, England. In recent years, it has received 'Science College' status. In 2017 an Ofsted inspection gave the school a Good rating.

== History ==
The school was founded in 1956 in Leeds as a boys' Grammar school, a status it retained until 1973. At its inception, the school was male-only and competed in Rugby Union with Leeds' state boys' schools who competed in that code, as well as the private male-only Leeds Grammar School. The male-only structure was abandoned as times changed, and Temple Moor is currently a mixed gender institution (1992). The school was associated with notable local families, most credibly the DeLacy family, who are recognised in the Temple Newsam area.

On 16 May 2007 construction workers punctured a chlorine tank whilst demolishing the school's disused swimming pool, forcing evacuation of the school.

Temple Moor is the first Leeds school ever to reach the Carnegie Champion Schools Final in its 30-year history.

Previously a foundation school administered by Leeds City Council, in November 2018 Temple Moor High School converted to academy status. The school is now sponsored by the Red Kite Learning Trust.

In late 2023, the schools Sixth Form block was renovated.

== Admissions ==
The school is oversubscribed, and currently has a roll of around 1,400 as of September 2018 pupils.

Temple Moor local feeder primary schools are: Temple Newsam Halton Primary School, Crossgates Primary School, Temple Learning Academy, Whitkirk Primary School, Colton Primary School, St. Peters Primary School and Austhorpe Primary School.

== Ofsted ==
In its 2013 Ofsted inspection the school was rated as Grade 2 (Good), and this was also the school's rating in its 2017 Ofsted inspection.

== Former houses ==
The school's original houses were based on names of local historical families: Manston (red), Scargill (white), Smeaton (yellow) and Irwin (purple). The DeLacy family is associated with Temple Newsam, an estate and country house situated nearby, from which the school derived its name and its Templar Cross emblem.

The House System was reintroduced in 2006–2007, as part of the school's 50 year anniversary, with the houses named after stars appropriate to the school's Science College specialist status:

House	Colour
Rigel	Purple
Capella	Yellow
Sirius	Silver
Vega	Red

The house system was discontinued in September 2017.

== Former students ==
- Dr. Ian McCormick, academic author and professor, University of Northampton
- Jonathan Michael Caine, Baron Caine of Temple Newsam
- Dr. Mark Taylor-Batty, professor of Theatre Studies, University of Leeds
- Nigel Botterill, business writer and entrepreneur
- Andrew Morton, author and journalist
