= Citizens' Assembly of Scotland =

2019 government-established citizens' assembly

Citizens' Assembly of Scotland Seanadh Saoranaich na h-Alba
- Citizens' assembly

History
- Founded: 2019

Leadership
- Convener: Kate Wimpress

Structure
- Seats: 100+
- Salary: £200 per weekend

The Citizens' Assembly of Scotland (Scottish Gaelic: Seanadh Saoranaich na h-Alba) is a citizens' assembly that was established in 2019 by the Scottish Government to deliberate on three broad issues of Scottish society:

- What kind of country are we seeking to build?
- How can we best overcome the challenges we face, including those arising from Brexit?
- What further work should be carried out to give people the detail they need to make informed choices about the future of the country?

== Establishment ==
The Citizens’ Assembly is one strand of the Scottish Government's three-pronged approach to determine constitutional and governance change for Scotland. The others are the establishment of a legal framework providing the option for a referendum through the 'Referendums (Scotland) Bill' and cross-party talks to identify areas of agreement on constitutional change.

== Principles ==
The Assembly will be conducted according to the following principles:

Independence from government: including through the appointment of an impartial and respected convener or co-conveners, an arms-length secretariat, and expert advisory groups.

Transparency: at all levels of the operation of the Assembly, from the framing of the questions, to the selection of members and expert witnesses, through to proactive publication and live-streaming of deliberative sessions and clarity about what the outputs will be used for.

Inclusion: extending not just to those invited to take part as members, but also to the operations of the Assembly itself.

Access: the wider public must be able to see and comment upon the work of the Assembly, and stakeholders must feel that they and their interests have a route into the Assembly.

Balance: the information used to build members’ (and the wider public's) learning must be balanced, credible and easily understood.

Cumulative learning: embedded into the design of the Assembly, to ensure members develop a rich understanding of the issues considered and have time to do so.

Open-mindedness: the Assembly will be a forum for open-minded deliberation between participants, ensuring the public see it as a genuine process of enquiry, and to help ensure that it receives an open-minded response from the parliament and government.

== Format and personnel ==
The assembly will have 120 members who represent a cross-section of Scottish society. The individuals will be broadly representative of Scotland's adult population in terms of age, gender, socio-economic class, ethnic group, geography and political attitudes. Members will be identified by early September, with the Assembly meeting on six weekends between the autumn and Spring 2020. MSPs, MPs, MEPs, councillors and members of the House of Lords, political party staff, public appointees and senior public and civil servants will be ineligible to sit on the Assembly, as will representatives and officials of relevant advocacy groups.

David Martin, former Member of the European Parliament for Scotland, and Kate Wimpress, from a charity and arts background, took office as co-conveners on 6 August 2019.

== Reception ==
The Citizens' Assembly has received criticism with some claiming the initiative is being used as a tool to achieve independence. Pro-independence journalist Neil Mackay has criticised the Scottish Government's approach to the citizens' assembly due to its announcement being alongside planning for a referendum on independence and SNP MP Joanna Cherry's comments on the links between a citizens' assembly and its links with independence.

Counter to this, Citizens' Assembly Co-convener David Martin said that under his chairmanship, the Citizens' Assembly will remain independent of Government and non-partisan, with the Assembly deciding amongst its members how to approach its remit without interference. Martin also called Cherry's comments 'unhelpful' making the task of establishing the assembly 'ten times harder'.

The Scottish Conservatives and the Scottish Liberal Democrats alongside campaign group Scotland in Union have called for a boycott of the Citizens' Assembly. Scottish Labour have not stated a stance on the citizens' assembly, with Chairman David Martin aiming to establish a non-partisan assembly that will reduce the fears of unionist participants.

Some academics noted the assembly had too broad of a remit to accomplish much in the short-term, but found the report impressive and considered the online deliberations as successful as in-person ones.
