= Coltness High School =

Coordinates: 55.78182°N 3.90539°W

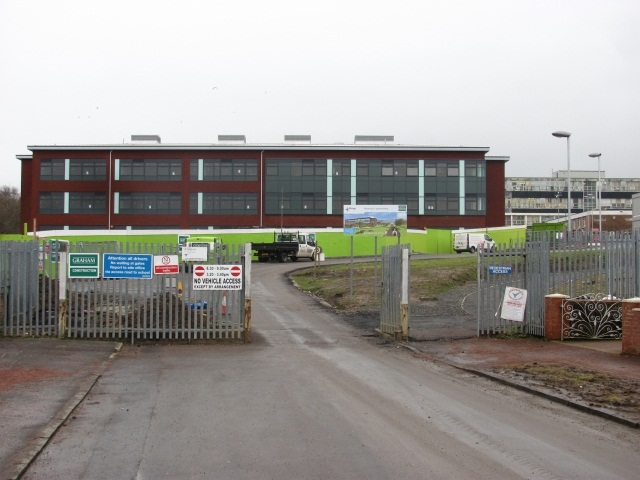
- The school building in February 2011

Location
- Mossland Drive; Wishaw, North Lanarkshire, ML2 8LY; Scotland

Information
- School type: Secondary
- Opened: 1966
- Authority: North Lanarkshire Council
- School number: 8339
- Head teacher: J McGilp
- Teaching staff: 56 (as of August 2014)
- Gender: Coeducational
- Age range: 11–18
- Enrollment: 780 (as of May 2015)
- Houses: Arran, Lewis, Skye
- Website: Coltness High School

Coltness High School is a secondary school located in Coltness, the largest suburb of Wishaw, North Lanarkshire, Scotland. The school opened in 1966, and as of May 2015 had a roll of 780 pupils. The school serves the catchment area of Coltness and Cambusnethan, as well as settlements outside of Wishaw such as Cleland.

From 2010 the school underwent a series of renovation works to modernise its aging facilities and reduce the likelihood of closure.

== Notable alumni ==
- Eilidh Austin, footballer
- Andrew Barrowman, footballer
- Derek Holmes, footballer
- Stewart Kerr, footballer
- Scott Leitch, footballer and manager
- Lewis Macleod, footballer
- David McEwan, footballer
- Lennon Miller, footballer
- Paul Quinn, footballer
- Catherine Stihler, Scottish MEP and Rector of the University of St Andrews
- David Turnbull, footballer
- Andrew Wilson, ex-MSP
- Stevie Jukes, musician, Saint Phnx
- Alan Jukes, musician, Saint Phnx
