= Ian Duncan, Baron Duncan of Springbank =

British politician (born 1973)

The Right Honourable The Lord Duncan of Springbank
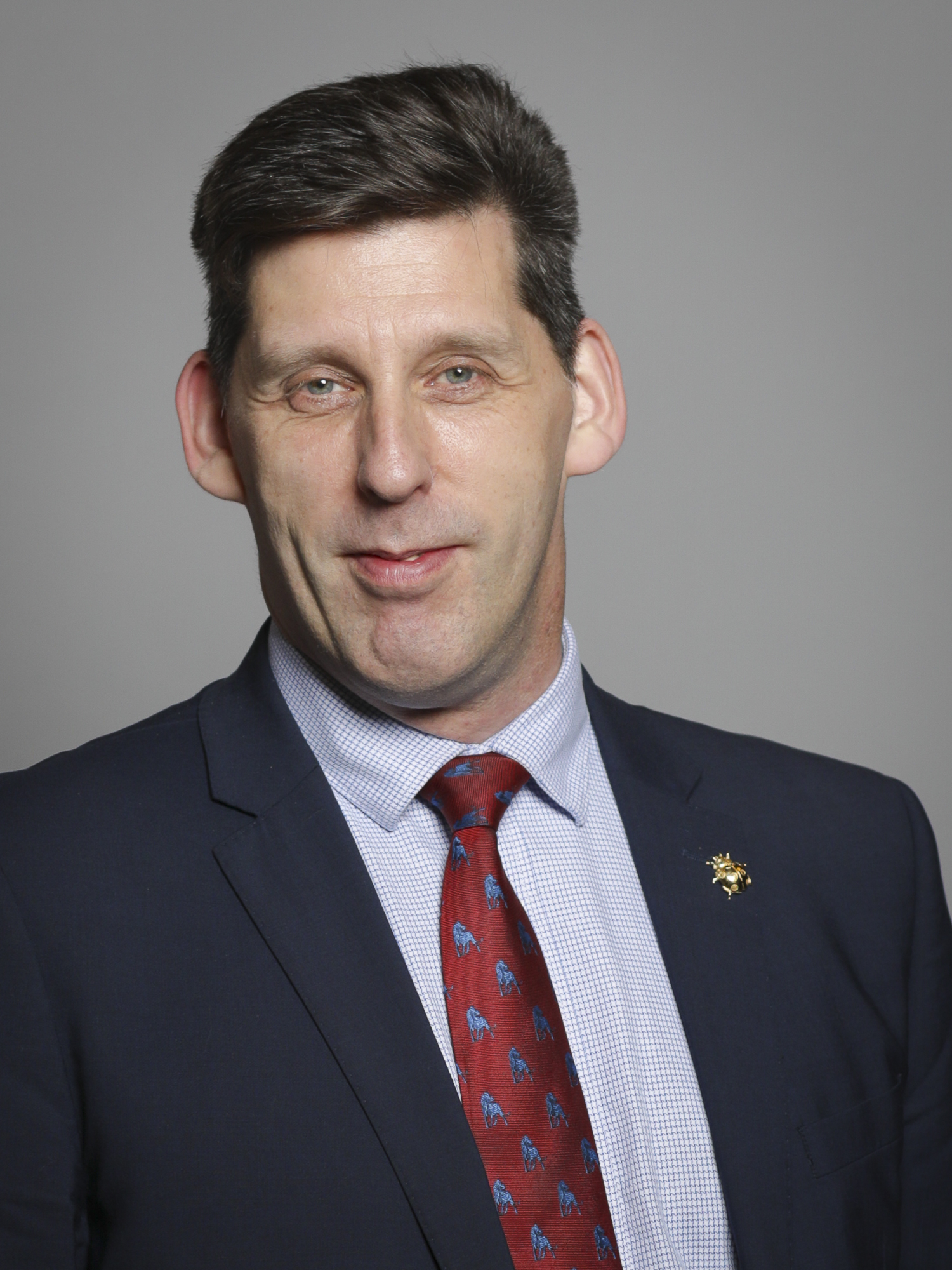
- Official portrait, 2019

Parliamentary Under-Secretary of State for Climate Change
- In office 26 July 2019 – 13 February 2020
- Prime Minister: Boris Johnson
- Preceded by: The Lord Henley (Note: As Parliamentary Under-Secretary of State for Business, Energy and Industrial Strategy.)
- Succeeded by: The Lord Callanan (Note: As Parliamentary Under-Secretary of State for Business, Energy and Corporate Responsibility.)

Parliamentary Under-Secretary of State for Northern Ireland
- In office 27 October 2017 – 13 February 2020
- Prime Minister: Theresa May; Boris Johnson
- Preceded by: The Lord Bourne of Aberystwyth
- Succeeded by: The Lord Caine (Note: Office vacant between 13 February 2020 and 5 November 2021.)

Parliamentary Under-Secretary of State for Scotland
- In office 15 June 2017 – 26 July 2019
- Prime Minister: Theresa May
- Preceded by: The Lord Dunlop (Note: As Parliamentary Under-Secretary of State for Scotland and Northern Ireland.)
- Succeeded by: Robin Walker; Colin Clark

Parliamentary Under-Secretary of State for Wales
- In office 17 June 2017 – 27 October 2017
- Prime Minister: Theresa May
- Preceded by: The Lord Bourne of Aberystwyth
- Succeeded by: The Lord Bourne of Aberystwyth

Member of the House of Lords
- Lord Temporal
- Life peerage 14 July 2017

Member of the European Parliament for Scotland
- In office 1 July 2014 – 22 June 2017
- Preceded by: Struan Stevenson
- Succeeded by: The Baroness Mobarik

Personal details
- Born: 13 February 1973 (age 53) Scotland
- Party: Conservative
- Education: University of St Andrews; University of Bristol
- Profession: Policy developer

Ian James Duncan, Baron Duncan of Springbank (born 13 February 1973) is a Scottish politician serving as a deputy speaker in the House of Lords. A member of the Conservative Party, he was formerly Minister for Climate Change in the Department for Business, Energy and Industrial Strategy and minister in the Northern Ireland Office. He initially joined the UK Government as a Scotland Office minister following the 2017 UK general election. Duncan was a Member of the European Parliament (MEP) for Scotland from 2014 to 2017. He is the only minister to have served in each of the UK Government's territorial offices.

== Early life ==
Duncan was born on 13 February 1973 and raised in Alyth, Perthshire, where he attended Alyth High School. He achieved a Bachelor of Science (BSc) degree in geology from the University of St Andrews in 1994, and subsequently earned a PhD degree in paleontology from the University of Bristol in 1997.

== Career before politics ==
During the late 1990s Duncan served as a policy analyst for BP's political affairs team, where he worked on the company's strategy for emerging economic prospects in post-communist eastern Europe and the former Soviet Union.

In 1999 Duncan became the deputy chief executive, and secretary for the Scottish Fishermen's Federation, where he developed policy and worked closely with the European Union, lobbying for the development of a regional management model that was later adopted by the European Commission.

From 2004 to 2005 he acted as the head of policy & communication for the Scottish Refugee Council, a charity which offers advice to those taking asylum within Scotland.

Duncan served as Head of the EU Office for the Scottish Parliament in Brussels from 2005 and 2011. Thereafter he was appointed Clerk to the Parliament's European Committee and EU Advisor to the Parliament. He resigned from his position in 2013 to pursue candidacy for the upcoming European elections with the Scottish Conservatives, following Struan Stevenson's announcement that he would not seek re-election.

== Political career ==
=== Member of the European Parliament ===
As a candidate for the Scottish Conservatives at the 2014 European election, Duncan campaigned on a platform of delivering reform in the European Union as well as an in-out referendum within three years.

Duncan sat on three committees of the European Parliament: the Committee on Industry, Research and Energy, the Committee on the Environment, Public Health and Food Safety and the Committee on Fisheries. He was the European Parliament's rapporteur on post-2020 reforms to the European Union Emissions Trading Scheme.

From 2014 Duncan served as the chief whip of the UK Conservative delegation. He was also a vice-chair of the Wine, Spirits and Quality Foodstuffs intergroup in the European Parliament.

In 2017, Duncan was ranked as the 10th-most influential MEP on environmental policy in the European Parliament. and the 6th-most influential on energy policy. EurActiv ranked Duncan as the 15th-most influential politician on energy union in Europe in 2016.

Duncan resigned as an MEP in 2017. He was replaced by The Baroness Mobarik.

=== UK Parliament candidate ===
Duncan was selected by the Scottish Conservatives as their candidate for Perth and North Perthshire in the 2017 UK general election. He lost to incumbent Pete Wishart, of the Scottish National Party, by 21 votes.

=== UK Government Minister ===
After he failed to win the Perth constituency, the Prime Minister's Office announced in June 2017 that Duncan would be granted a life peerage and thus become a member of the House of Lords, in order to take up his appointment as Parliamentary Under-Secretary of State for Scotland and for Wales. On 14 July, he was created Baron Duncan of Springbank, of Springbank in the County of Perth.

Following a reshuffle Duncan was appointed a minister in the Northern Ireland Office and demitted office in the Wales Office. He retained his position in the Scotland Office until 2019.

Duncan called out the UK government for failing to stand up for trans people at the PinkNews Awards 2022.

In July 2025 he was required to apologise after a report by the House of Lords Commissioner for Standards found that he had breached parliamentary standards by facilitating a meeting between Andrew Bowie, the Under-Secretary of State for Nuclear and Networks at the time, and Simon Irish, the chief executive of the American nuclear technology company Terrestrial Energy, for which Duncan was a paid advisor.

== Personal life ==
Duncan maintains a keen interest in public speaking. He is the honorary president of English Speaking Union Scotland, previously serving as Chairman (2014–2017) and Speech & Debates Officer. Duncan is a former English-Speaking Union US Debating Scholar (1995). He retains links to academia, acting as an advisor to University of St Andrews' Institute of Legal and Constitutional Research. Duncan is a fellow of the Geological Society.

In 2014, Duncan was appointed to the board of advisers of the Schwarzenegger Institute at the University of Southern California, established by former California governor Arnold Schwarzenegger.

He serves as President of the Northern Ireland Conservatives since his election to the role in 2022. He is also a patron of LGBT+ Conservatives and is openly gay.

== Notes ==
European Parliament
Preceded by Struan Stevenson	Member of the European Parliament for Scotland; 2014–2017	Succeeded by The Baroness Mobarik
Political offices
Preceded by The Lord Bourne of Aberystwyth	Parliamentary Under-Secretary of State for Wales; 2017	Succeeded by The Lord Bourne of Aberystwyth
Preceded by The Lord Dunlop as Parliamentary Under-Secretary of State for Scotland and Northern Ireland	Parliamentary Under-Secretary of State for Scotland; 2017–2019	Succeeded by Robin Walker; Colin Clark
Preceded by The Lord Bourne of Aberystwyth	Parliamentary Under-Secretary of State for Northern Ireland; 2017–2020	Vacant Title next held by The Lord Caine
Preceded by The Lord Henley as Parliamentary Under-Secretary of State for Business, Energy and Industrial Strategy	Parliamentary Under-Secretary of State for Climate Change; 2019–2020	Succeeded by The Lord Callanan as Parliamentary Under-Secretary of State for Business, Energy and Corporate Responsibility
Orders of precedence in the United Kingdom
Preceded by The Lord Llewellyn of Steep	Gentlemen; Baron Duncan of Springbank	Followed by The Lord Agnew of Oulton
