= David Martin (Scottish politician) =

British Labour Party politician

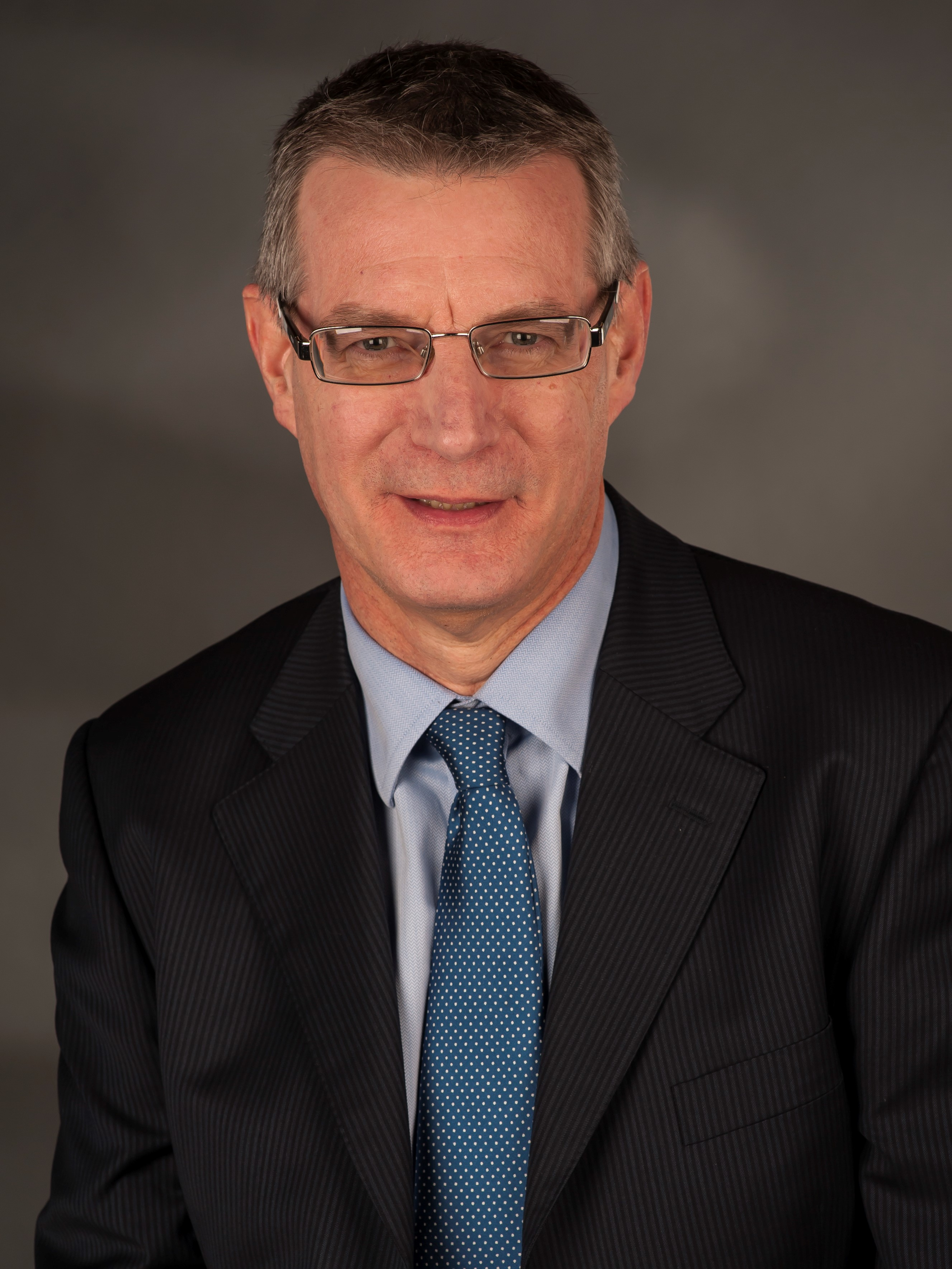
- Official portrait, 2014

Co-convener of the Citizens' Assembly of Scotland
- Incumbent
- Assumed office 6 August 2019 Serving with Kate Wimpress
- Preceded by: Position established

Member of the European Parliament for Scotland Lothians (1984–1999)
- In office 14 June 1984 – 1 July 2019
- Preceded by: Ian Dalziel
- Succeeded by: Aileen McLeod

Personal details
- Born: 26 August 1954 (age 72) Edinburgh, Scotland
- Party: Scottish Labour
- Other political affiliations: Progressive Alliance of Socialists and Democrats
- Spouse(s): Margaret Martin (div); Lorraine Davidson
- Education: Heriot-Watt University; University of Leicester
- Profession: Economist

David Martin (born 26 August 1954) is a Scottish politician who has served as co-convener of the Citizens' Assembly of Scotland since 2019. A member of the Scottish Labour Party, he was a Member of the European Parliament (MEP) from 1984 to 2019, having first represented the Lothians constituency until 1999 and then for the Scotland constituency. He was the United Kingdom's longest serving MEP and the second longest serving MEP in the whole European Parliament.

== Early life ==
David Martin was born and educated in Edinburgh, where he attended Liberton High School then Heriot-Watt University. Prior to entering politics, he worked as a stockbroker's assistant, and also as an animal rights campaigner.

== Political career ==
Martin was first elected as a councillor in 1982.

=== European Parliament ===
Martin won the Lothians seat in the 1984 European Parliament election. He retained his seat, and following a reform of the electoral system, was in 1999 elected to represent the whole of Scotland along with other members.

He was elected in 1987 as the youngest ever leader of the British Labour delegation of MEPs. He was Vice-President of the European Parliament from 1989 to 2004, the longest period anyone has served in that position. In 2002 he was the defeated Socialist candidate for President of the Parliament.

He was the European Parliament's rapporteur on the Maastricht and Amsterdam Treaties.

Martin supported Owen Smith in the 2016 Labour Party (UK) leadership election.

Martin was first on the Scottish Labour party list for the 2019 European Parliament election. The result for Scotland was declared on 17 May 2019. Scottish Labour lost both its seats, receiving 9.3% of the vote. He did not attend the declaration, leaving Edinburgh City Chambers the night before.

==== Trade Committee ====
Martin was a co-ordinator and spokesperson for the Socialists and Democrats Group on the International Trade (INTA) committee. As well as this role, he was the rapporteur for the EU-Singapore Free Trade Agreement and standing rapporteur for the ASEAN-5 countries.

Martin stepped in as the rapporteur for the ACTA treaty after the original rapporteur, Kader Arif, resigned in protest. In April 2012, Martin recommended that the European Parliament reject ACTA, on the grounds that civil liberties were not adequately protected. His recommendation was adopted by the Parliament in the biggest ever defeat of a legislative proposal from the European Commission – 478 MEPs voted against ACTA, 39 in favour, and 165 abstained.

In 2013, Martin was voted MEP of the year in the international trade category by The Parliament Magazine.

Martin was the rapporteur for the UN Arms Trade Treaty, encouraging member states to ratify the treaty and pushing for the EU to lead strict global implementation of new rules for greater transparency and responsibility in the arms industry.

==== Animal Welfare ====
Martin is Honorary Vice-President of the Animal Welfare Intergroup, a cross-party group of MEPs striving for animal rights.

He was instrumental in the 2009 Seal Regulation, which bans the sale of seal products in the European Union. It has been estimated by the Humane Society International that in Canada around 250,000 seals have been saved per year as a result of this ruling. This was reinforced by a landmark WTO ruling following a challenge to the EU legislation by the Norwegian and Canadian governments.

=== Scottish politics ===
Following the Brexit vote of 23 June 2016, Martin was invited to join the First Minister's Standing Council on Europe, a cross-party body which offers advice to the Scottish government on how best to protect Scotland's relationship with the European Union. In contrast to England and Wales, Scotland voted firmly in favour of EU membership by 62% to 38%.

In a video he explained, "she [First Minister Nicola Sturgeon] assured me this would be an all-party and no-party, a pro-independence and an anti-independence grouping, that there would be no bias one way or the other. Our job is simply to look at what would be best for Scotland in the new situation that we face".

In January 2024, Martin became President of the European Movement in Scotland.

=== Citizens' Assembly ===
Since losing his seat in 2019, Martin has been appointed as co-convener of the Citizens' Assembly of Scotland. He took office on 6 August 2019 with co-convener Kate Wimpress.

In July 2019, Joanna Cherry, Member of Parliament for Edinburgh South West, suggested the Assembly would be used to promote Scottish nationalism. Martin, a unionist, refused to endorse a boycott of the Assembly encouraged by Scotland in Union, the Scottish Conservatives and the Scottish Liberal Democrats. He insisted the running of the Assembly would be impartial and expressed his disappointment at the going ahead of the boycott.

== Personal life ==
Martin is married to Lorraine Davidson, with two children; he also has two children from a previous marriage to his first wife Margaret.

Party political offices
Preceded by Alf Lomas	Leader of the European Parliamentary Labour Party; 1987–1988	Succeeded by Barry Seal
