= Struan Stevenson =

Scottish politician (born 1948)

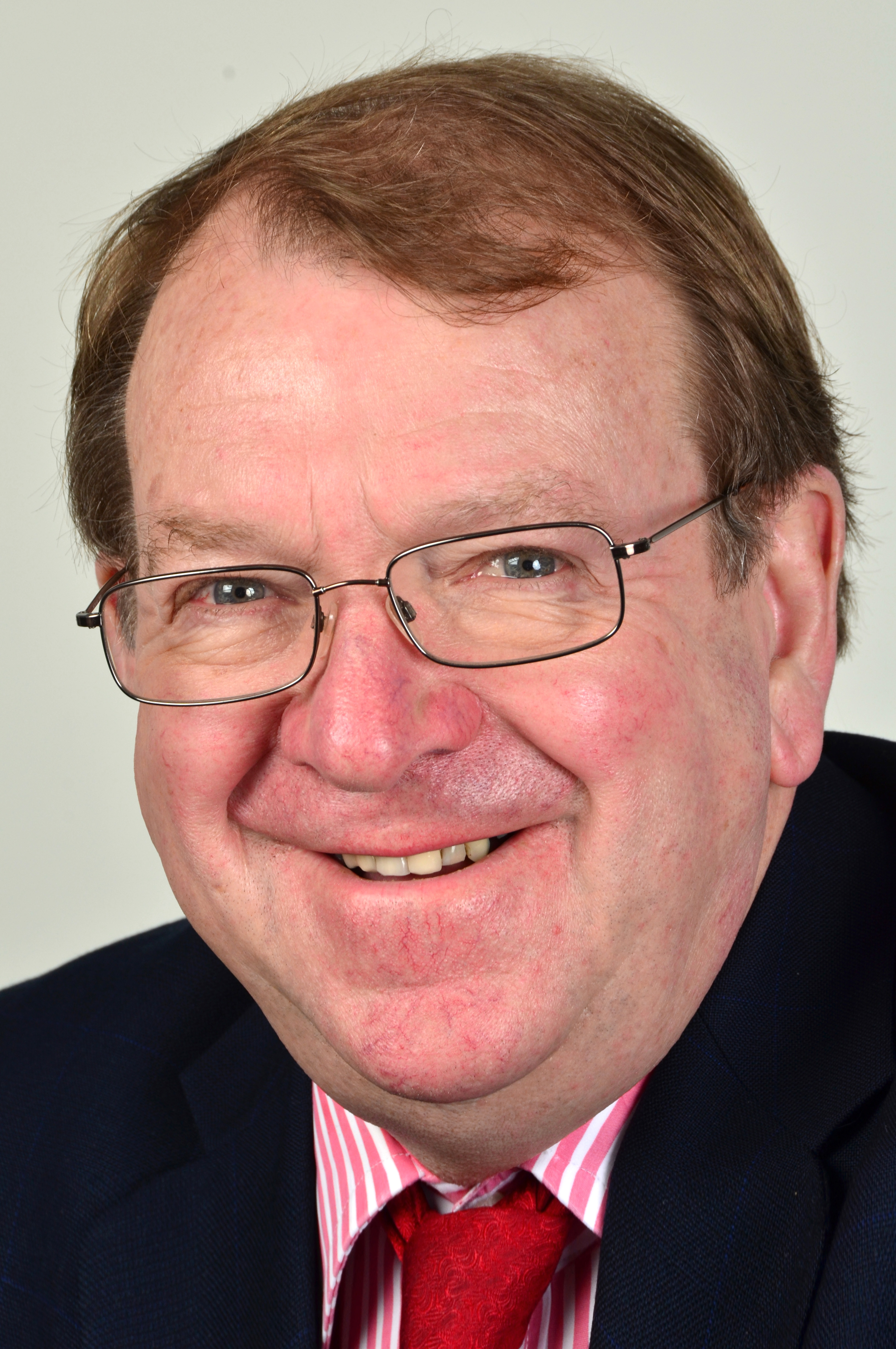

Member of the European Parliament for Scotland
- In office 10 June 1999 – 2 July 2014
- Preceded by: Position established
- Succeeded by: Ian Duncan

Personal details
- Born: 4 April 1948 (age 78) Ballantrae, Ayrshire, Scotland
- Party: Scottish Conservative
- Website: struanstevenson.com

Struan John Stirton Stevenson (born 4 April 1948) is a Scottish politician. He was the Conservative Member of the European Parliament (MEP) for Scotland from 1999 to 2014 and chair and Vice Chair of the Committee on Fisheries, and was also a member of the Executive of the Scottish Conservative party. He was President of the European Parliament's Delegation for Relations with Iraq and President of the Friends of Free Iran Intergroup (FoFI).

Stevenson is President of the European Iraqi Freedom Association (EIFA) and Coordinator of the Campaign for Iran Change. He is a columnist with The Herald and an international lecturer on human rights. He is CEO of Scottish Business UK (SBUK), a pro-Union business group. He was educated at the independent Strathallan School and the West of Scotland Agricultural College.

== Political career ==
Stevenson attended the West of Scotland Agricultural College and initially managed his family farm before entering politics. His political career began in local councillor for 22 years, sitting on South Ayrshire Council and its predecessor body the Kyle and Carrick District Council. He stood for election to Parliament at the 1987 election, the 1992 election and 1997 election. He was then elected to the European Parliament in 1999, and retained his seat in 2004 and 2009. He retired from the European Parliament at the elections in 2014.

=== Semipalatinsk radiation victims ===
As an MEP, Stevenson led an international campaign to raise awareness and secure aid for the victims of radiation in the Semipalatinsk region of Kazakhstan, where the Soviet Union government tested 607 nuclear devices from 1949 to 1990, leaving an appalling legacy of pollution, deprivation, illness and death. He was awarded with an honorary doctorate in Science from the Semey State Medical Academy, State Medical Academy in Semipalatinsk in recognition of his efforts and on his third visit to Kazakhstan in 2003, he was made an honorary citizen of Semipalatinsk.

In September 2004 Stevenson won a $50,000 prize in an international essay competition sponsored by the US-based John Templeton Foundation for an essay entitled "Crying Forever" describing the suffering of the people of Semipalatinsk. Stevenson donated the entire $50,000 to Mercy Corps Scotland to assist with their work in Semipalatinsk.

In 2006 he published a book, also entitled Crying Forever, detailing his experiences in Kazakhstan. The book was launched at the UN Headquarters in New York and all proceeds from its sale were presented by Stevenson to the Children's Hospital in Semipalatinsk, totalling over $20,000. In January 2007 Stevenson was decorated by the President of Kazakhstan with the "Shapagat" ("Mercy") award for his humanitarian work in Semipalatinsk.

=== Ban of cat and dog fur ===
Stevenson also led a successful campaign for eight years in the European Parliament to impose an EU-wide ban on the import, export and trade in cat and dog fur. It was estimated that up to two million cats and dogs were being slaughtered each year in China alone, simply to meet demand for fur products in Europe. Working with Humane Society International, Stevenson's campaign generated more than a million emails and signatures on petitions, finally culminating in a draft regulation being prepared by the European Commission and voted through the European Parliament. The regulation was enacted into European Union law across all 27 Member States in 2008.

=== Climate change ===
Stevenson was president of the European Parliament's Climate Change, Biodiversity & Sustainable Development Intergroup. He has been an outspoken critic of off-shore wind farms. Stevenson has recently cited the loss of ocean carbon sinks due to offshore wind turbines as a possible reason not to build them, and outlined the pros and cons of wind turbines in his book, So Much Wind: The Myth of Green Energy.

=== Iraq ===
Stevenson was chairman of European Parliament's Delegation for Relations with Iraq (2009–2014). Since the foundation of the European Iraqi Freedom Association (EIFA), a non-governmental and non-profit organisation based in Brussels 4 April 2014, he has acted as its president.

== Personal life ==
Stevenson's wife Pat is a former editor of BBC Radio Scotland. They have two sons and three grandsons. Stevenson comes from a family with historical ties, including a connection to Robert Louis Stevenson, the author of Treasure Island.

== Bibliography ==
- Dictatorship and Revolution: Iran – A Contemporary History (2023). ISBN 94-647522-5-4
- The Course of History: Ten Meals That Changed the World (2017)
- Stevenson, Struan (2015). Self-Sacrifice: Life with the Iranian Mojahedin. Birlinn, Edinburgh. ISBN 978-1-78027-288-7.
- Stevenson, Struan (2013). So Much Wind: The Myth of Green Energy. Birlinn ltd. ISBN 978-1-78027-113-2.
- Stalin's Legacy: The Soviet War on Nature (2012)
- Crying Forever: A Nuclear Diary (2006)
- Crying Forever (Russian version) (2006)
