= Lothians (European Parliament constituency) =

Former European Parliament constituency

- European Parliament constituency
- Boundary within Scotland (1979-1984)
- Member state: United Kingdom
- Created: 1979
- Dissolved: 1999
- MEPs: 1

Prior to its uniform adoption of proportional representation in 1999, the United Kingdom used first-past-the-post for the European elections in England, Scotland and Wales. The European Parliament constituencies used under that system were smaller than the later regional constituencies and only had one Member of the European Parliament each.

The constituency of Lothians was one of them.

Boundary within Scotland (1984-1999)

== Boundaries ==
1979–1984: Edinburgh Central, Edinburgh East, Edinburgh Leith, Edinburgh North, Edinburgh Pentlands, Edinburgh South, Edinburgh West, Midlothian, West Lothian.

1984–1999: Edinburgh Central, Edinburgh East, Edinburgh Leith, Edinburgh Pentlands, Edinburgh South, Edinburgh West, Linlithgow, Livingston, Midlothian.

== Members of the European Parliament ==
Elected	Member	Party
1979	Ian Dalziel	Conservative
1984	David Martin	Labour
1989	David Martin	Labour
1994	David Martin	Labour

== Election results ==
European elections 1994: Lothians
Party	Candidate	Votes	%	±%
Labour	David Martin	90,531	44.9	+3.6
SNP	Keith Brown	53,324	26.5	+6.1
Conservative	Patrick McNally	33,526	16.6	–7.0
Liberal Democrats	Hilary C. Campbell	17,883	8.9	+4.7
Green	Robin Harper	5,149	2.6	–7.9
Socialist (GB)	John McGregor	637	0.3	New
Natural Law	Michael Siebert	500	0.2	New
Majority		37,207	18.4	+0.7
Turnout		201,550	38.7	–3.3
Labour hold		Swing	–1.3	

European elections 1989: Lothians
Party	Candidate	Votes	%	±%
Labour	David Martin	90,840	41.3	+0.9
Conservative	Catherine M. Blight	52,014	23.6	–2.9
SNP	Jay Smith	44,935	20.4	+8.4
Green	Robin Harper	22,983	10.5	+9.1
SLD	Keith Leadbetter	9,222	4.2	−15.5
Majority		38,826	17.7	+3.8
Turnout		219,994	42.0	+6.7
Labour hold		Swing	+1.9	

European elections 1984: Lothians
Party	Candidate	Votes	%	±%
Labour	David Martin	74,989	40.4	+7.8
Conservative	Iain J. Henderson	49,065	26.5	–9.1
SDP	Dickson Mabon	36,636	19.7	+3.9
SNP	David J.D. Stevenson	22,331	12.0	–4.0
Ecology	Linda M. Hendry	2,560	1.4	New
Majority		25,924	13.9	N/A
Turnout		185,581	35.3	+0.4
Labour gain from Conservative		Swing	+8.5	

European elections 1979: Lothians
Party	Candidate	Votes	%	±%
Conservative	Ian Dalziel	66,761	35.6	
Labour	A.A. Mackie	61,180	32.6	
SNP	D.J.D. Stevenson	29,935	16.0	
Liberal	Robert L. Smith	29,518	15.8	
Majority		5,581	3.0	
Turnout		187,394	34.9	
Conservative win (new seat)				
