= Nosheena Mobarik =

British life peer (born 1957)

The Right Honourable The Baroness Mobarik CBE
- نوشینہ شاہین مبارک
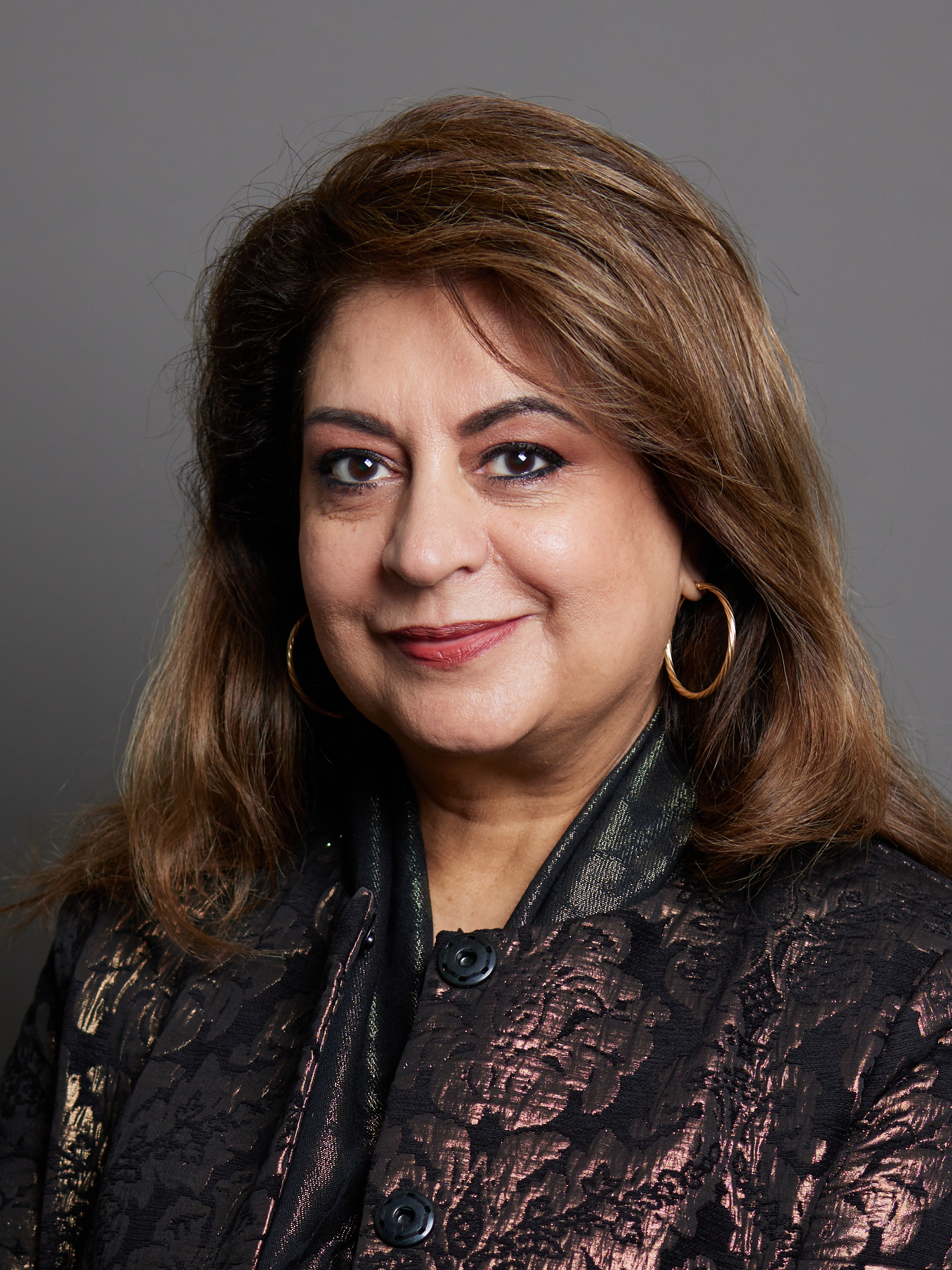

Baroness-in-waiting Government Whip
- In office 17 July 2016 – 6 April 2017
- Prime Minister: Theresa May
- Preceded by: The Lord Bourne of Aberystwyth
- Succeeded by: The Baroness Buscombe

Member of the European Parliament for Scotland
- In office 11 September 2017 – 31 January 2020
- Preceded by: The Lord Duncan of Springbank
- Succeeded by: Constituency abolished

Member of the House of Lords
- Lord Temporal
- Life peerage 19 September 2014

Personal details
- Born: Nosheena Shaheen Mobarik; 16 October 1957 (age 69) Glasgow, Scotland
- Party: Conservative
- Spouse: Iqbal Mobarik
- Children: 2
- Education: Shawlands Academy
- Alma mater: University of Strathclyde (BA)
- Occupation: Politician; businesswoman

Nosheena Shaheen Mobarik, Baroness Mobarik CBE (Punjabi: نوشینہ شاہین مبارک; born 16 October 1957) is a British Conservative politician and Life Peer. She served as a Member of European Parliament for Scotland from 2017 to 2020.

== Early life and education ==
Mobarik was born in Glasgow on 16 October 1957 to a Pakistani family originally from Mian Channu, Khanewal District, Pakistan which emigrated to Scotland in the early 1950s. Soon after she was born her family went back to live in Pakistan. At the age of six, she migrated with her family back to Glasgow, Scotland. Mobarik completed her secondary education at Shawlands Academy. She graduated with a Bachelor of Arts with Honours in History from the University of Strathclyde in 1991.

== Career ==
=== Business ===
In 1997 Mobarik and her husband, Dr Iqbal Mobarik, set up M Computer Technologies, an IT business solutions company aimed at retail companies. In 1999 M Computer Technologies won the Business Startup of the Year Award, going on to be voted Scotland's Company of the Year in 2005. That same year Mobarik was named Business Woman of the Year.

Mobarik was a Member of the Business Advisory Forum of Glasgow Caledonian University 2007–2011, and served on the West Regional Advisory Board of Scottish Enterprise, 2009–2011.

From 2007 to 2011, Mobarik was a Member of the Business Advisory Forum of Glasgow Caledonian University.

=== Confederation of British Industry (CBI) ===
Mobarik was first elected to the Council of CBI Scotland in 2001, following which she was re-elected in 2004, 2007, and 2010. Mobarik held this position until serving a two-year term as Chairman of CBI Scotland between 2011 and 2013. As Chairman Mobarik became a leading member of two influential CBI committees, the Chair's Committee and the President's Committee.

A focus during Mobarik's time as Chairman was developing the agenda in support of growing small firms in Scotland and increasing Scotland's exports.

=== Philanthropy ===
Mobarik has held a deep interest in human rights throughout her life and has worked to raise awareness around human rights issues over many years.

She was a founder of the Save the Bosnian People Campaign, which was inaugurated in 1995. She travelled to Bosnia to see the effects of the conflict herself and worked to raise awareness about the human rights violations in the UK and raise money for the victims.

Mobarik was also the director of the multi-faith charity Glasgow the Caring City, from 2001 to 2006.

=== Pakistan ===
Mobarik has spent much of her career building relations between Scotland and Pakistan and then later with the rest of the UK.

In 2008, Mobarik formed the Scottish Pakistan network, which aims to facilitate business and cultural links between Scotland and Pakistan.

In 2008, Mobarik was appointed chair of the Pakistan Britain Trade & Investment Forum (PBTIF). Mobarik rebranded the PBTIF; this council has both the support of the UK and Pakistan government and is a vehicle to increase bilateral trade and investment in both countries.

== Political career ==
In June 2013, Mobarik was appointed to the Strathclyde Commission on future devolution in Scotland, chaired by Lord Strathclyde, on behalf of the Scottish Conservative Party. The Commission published its report in June 2014.

In November of the same year, Mobarik joined the board of the Better Together Campaign. Better Together was the official campaign for a No Vote in the Scottish Independence Referendum, 2014, and was chaired by Alistair Darling.

Mobarik was a Scottish Conservative Party candidate in the May 2014 European Parliament elections.

In March 2018, Mobarik was asked by Ruth Davidson, leader of the Scottish Conservative Party, to head up a commission aimed at encouraging more women and ethnic minorities to stand for the party.

=== House of Lords ===
In 2014, Mobarik was appointed as a Conservative life peer, assuming the title of Baroness Mobarik of Mearns in the county of Renfrewshire.

Mobarik's maiden speech in the Lords was on the Modern Day Slavery Bill.

From March 2015 to 2017, Mobarik served as a party whip and then as a government whip from 2016 to 2017 for the Department for International Trade and the Department for International Development.

=== Member of European Parliament ===
In September 2017, she replaced Ian Duncan as Conservative MEP for the Scotland constituency.

In the European Parliament Mobarik has worked on bringing awareness to the plight of the Rohingya in Myanmar. As part of this work, Mobarik visited the Cox's Bazar refugee camp in Bangladesh in April 2018.

Mobarik also spoke at the European Parliament calling for EU countries to step up their action to end early forced marriage.

At the 2019 European Parliament elections Baroness Mobarik was the leading candidate on the Scottish Conservative Party's list and was one of six MEPs elected for the Scotland Constituency. She served as MEP until the 31 January 2020, when the Brexit process was completed.

== Honours and awards ==
Mobarik was appointed an Officer of the Order of the British Empire (OBE) in the 2004 Birthday Honours, and was promoted to Commander (CBE) in the 2014 Birthday Honours, for her services to Business and Public Service in Scotland.

The state of Pakistan awarded her the Tamgha-e-Imtiaz in 2012, in recognition of her work in improving Pakistan–Scotland relations.

In January 2013 she was awarded an honorary doctorate from the University of Edinburgh

Mobarik was created a life peer as Baroness Mobarik, of Mearns in the County of Renfrewshire, on 19 September 2014.
