= Ken Collins (Scottish politician) =

Scottish politician

Sir Ken Collins
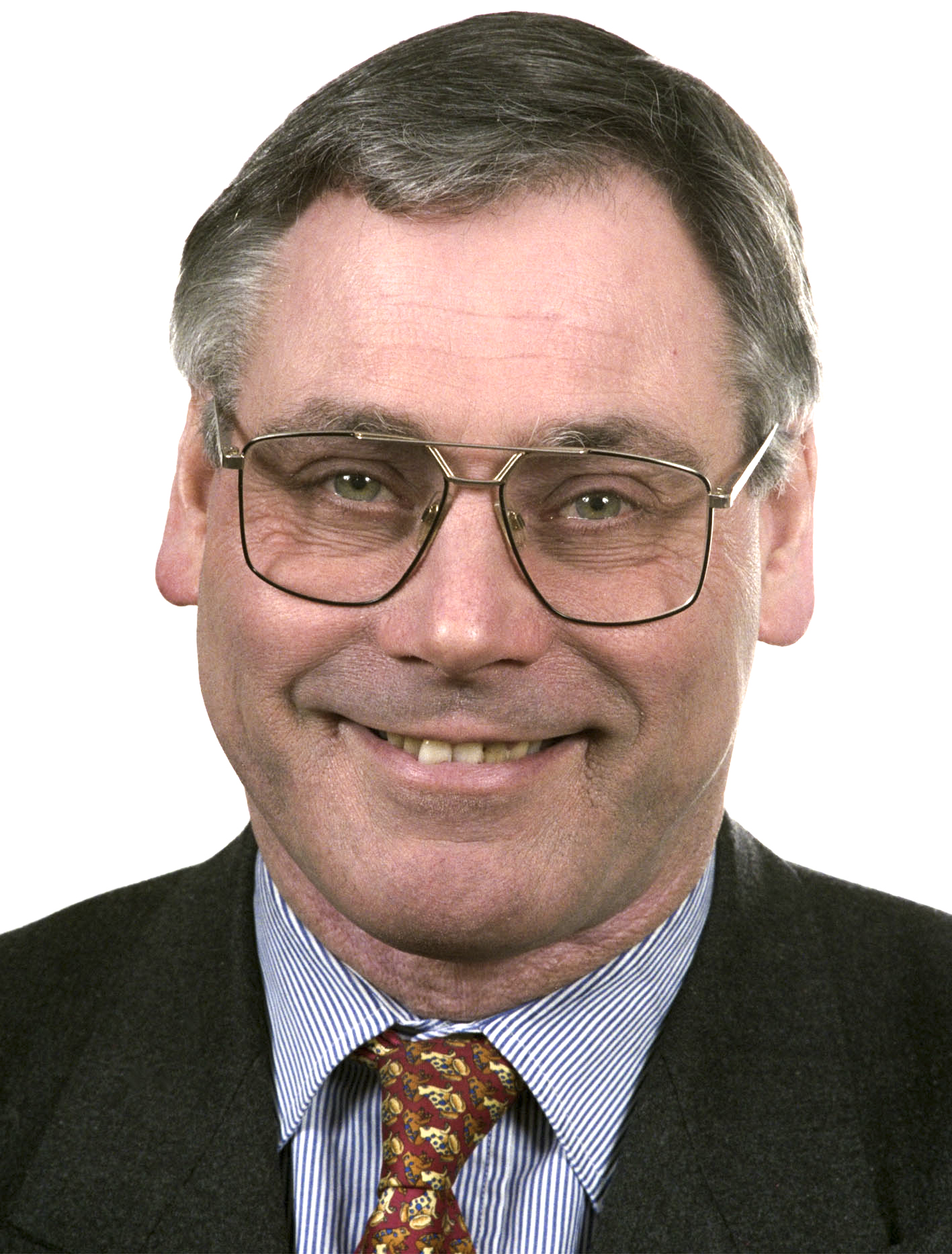
- Collins in 1994

Member of the European Parliament for Strathclyde East
- In office 1979 – 20 July 1999
- Preceded by: Constituency established
- Succeeded by: Constituency abolished

Personal details
- Born: Kenneth Darlingston Collins; 12 August 1939 (age 87) Hamilton, Lanarkshire, Scotland, United Kingdom
- Party: Labour
- Education: University of Glasgow; University of Strathclyde

Sir Kenneth Darlingston Collins (born 12 August 1939) is a Scottish former politician who was Member of the European Parliament and Chairman of the Scottish Environment Protection Agency.

== Early life ==
Collins was born in Hamilton, Lanarkshire, Scotland and educated at the former Hamilton Academy. He later studied at the University of Glasgow and University of Strathclyde, attaining Bsc (Hons) and Msc.

== Early career ==
On leaving university, Collins worked as a local authority planning officer and lectured at the Glasgow School of Art and Paisley College of Technology subsequently being elected a Member of East Kilbride Town and District Council (1973–79) and of Lanark County Council (1973–75). From 1976 to 1979, Collins was also a member of the East Kilbride Development Corporation and, from 1974 to 1976, Chairman of North East Glasgow Children's Panel.

== Later career ==
In 1979, Collins was elected a Member of the European Parliament, serving as deputy leader of the U.K. Labour Group at the European Parliament from 1979 to 1984 and as chairman of the European Parliament's Environment Committee, 1979–84; vice-chairman from 1984 to 1987; and again as chairman from 1989 to 1999. Collins was also Socialist spokesman on environment, public health and consumer protection at the European Parliament from 1984 to 1989.

In 1999, Collins was appointed chairman of the Scottish Environment Protection Agency (SEPA) and subsequently re-appointed in 2004, holding the post until December 2007.

== Appointments, awards and honours ==
Collins is a Fellow of the Royal Scottish Geographical Society and The Royal Geographical Society; an Hon. Fellow of the Chartered Institution of Water and Environmental Management and of the Chartered Institution of Wastes Management; and a Fellow of the Industry and Parliament Trust.

He is also a board member of the Institute for European Environmental Policy, London, and of Energy Action Scotland; a former member of the British Waterways Scotland Group; a Trustee of The Green Foundation; board member of the Central Scotland Forest Trust (2001–04, and chairman 1998–2001); a former board member, Forward Scotland; a former chairman (1999–2002) of Tak Tent Cancer Support; and member of the management board, European Environment Agency.

An ambassador for the National Asthma Campaign, Collins has also served as honorary vice-president of the National Society for Clean Air; as vice-president of the Royal Environmental Health Institute of Scotland and as honorary president of the Scottish Association of Geography Teachers.

Collins was invested with knighthood in 2003 for services to environmental protection and awarded an Honorary Degree of Doctor from the University of Paisley in 2004.
