= Strathclyde East (European Parliament constituency) =

Former European Parliament constituency

- European Parliament constituency
- Boundary within Scotland (1979-1984)
- Member state: United Kingdom
- Created: 1979
- Dissolved: 1999
- MEPs: 1

Prior to its uniform adoption of proportional representation in 1999, the United Kingdom used first-past-the-post for the European elections in England, Scotland and Wales. The European Parliament constituencies used under that system were smaller than the later regional constituencies and only had one Member of the European Parliament each.

The constituency of Strathclyde East was one of them.

When it was created in Scotland in 1979, it consisted of the Westminster Parliament constituencies of Bothwell, Coatbridge and Airdrie, East Kilbride, Hamilton, Kilmarnock, Lanarkshire North, Motherwell and Wishaw, and Rutherglen. From 1984 until 1999 it consisted of the constituencies of Cumbernauld and Kilsyth, East Kilbride, Glasgow Rutherglen, Hamilton, Kilmarnock and Loudoun, Monklands East, Monklands West, Motherwell North, and Motherwell South.

Boundary within Scotland (1984-1999)

== Members of the European Parliament ==
Elected	Member	Party
1979	Ken Collins	Labour
1984	Ken Collins	Labour
1989	Ken Collins	Labour
1994	Ken Collins	Labour

== Election results ==
European Parliament election, 1979: Strathclyde East
Party	Candidate	Votes	%	±%
Labour	Ken Collins	72,263	49.8	
Conservative	Miss M. A. Carse	41,482	28.6	
SNP	G. S. Murray	21,013	14.5	
Liberal	Dr. J. D. Watts	10,325	7.1	
Majority		30,781	21.2	
Turnout		145,083	31.3	
Labour win (new seat)				

European Parliament election, 1984: Strathclyde East
Party	Candidate	Votes	%	±%
Labour	Ken Collins	90,792	58.6	+8.8
SNP	George A. Leslie	27,330	17.6	+3.1
Conservative	P. R. (Ross) Leckie	24,857	16.1	−12.5
Liberal	Mrs. Patricia de Seume	11,883	7.7	+0.6
Majority		63,462	41.0	
Turnout		154,862	31.1	
Labour hold		Swing		

European Parliament election, 1989: Strathclyde East
Party	Candidate	Votes	%	±%
Labour	Ken Collins	109,170	56.2	−2.4
SNP	George A. Leslie	48,853	25.2	+7.6
Conservative	Dr. Michael K. Dutt	22,233	11.4	−4.7
Green	Alastair Whitelaw	9,749	5.0	New
SLD	Graham C. H. Lait	4,276	2.2	−5.5
Majority		60,317	31.0	−10.0
Turnout		194,281	39.3	+8.2
Labour hold		Swing		

European Parliament election, 1994: Strathclyde East
Party	Candidate	Votes	%	±%
Labour	Ken Collins	106,476	58.0	+1.8
SNP	Ian Hamilton	54,136	29.5	+4.3
Conservative	Brian D. Cooklin	13,915	7.6	−3.8
Liberal Democrats	R. (Bob) Stewart	6,383	3.5	+1.3
Green	Alistair Whitelaw	1,874	1.0	−4.0
Natural Law	J. D. (Dobie) Gilmour	787	0.4	New
Majority		52,340	28.5	−2.5
Turnout		183,571	37.3	−2.0
Labour hold		Swing		
