= John Edward (civil servant) =

Scottish policy professional and civil servant (born 1968)

Head of Operations of the Scottish Council on Global Affairs since 2023.

Personal details
- Born: 22 September 1968 (age 58) Edinburgh, Scotland
- Spouse: Alexandra Angulo
- Relations: Elizabeth and David Edward.
- Children: One son One daughter
- Education: University of St Andrews; University of Glasgow; Università per Stranieri di Siena
- Profession: public policy, public servant, international affairs

John Edward (born 22 September 1968) is Head of Operations of the Scottish Council on Global Affairs Scotland's first international relations institute, previously a charity CEO, an EU and Scottish civil servant and campaigner.

== Education ==
John Edward was educated at the University of St Andrews (Scottish History), the University of Glasgow and the Università per Stranieri di Siena.

== Career ==
After working as a stagiaire (intern) in ECHO (European Commission) in Brussels, John Edward worked for the European Policy Centre as personal assistant to Max Kohnstamm.
He was employed for 5 years as the EU Policy Manager by Scotland Europa.

John Edward was then Parliamentary Manager for Scottish Enterprise then served as Head of the Office in Scotland of the European Parliament from 2003 to 2009.

From 2010 to 2023, John Edward was Director of the Scottish Council of Independent Schools.

== European campaigning ==
John Edward was Chief Campaign Spokesman for Scotland Stronger in Europe, the discrete Scottish campaign to Remain in the European Union during the 2016 United Kingdom European Union membership referendum.

From 2016 to 2018, John Edward represented Scotland for Open Britain. In 2018-19 he chaired media events for the Scotland element of the People's Vote campaign.

He contributed a chapter on "Soft power in hard times" to the 2017 IPPR publication, "Scotland, the UK and Brexit: A guide to the future". In 2023, he wrote for Encompass Europe on the 25th anniversary of devolution and the European Union.

He was a Liberal Democrat candidate in the 2019 European Parliament election in the United Kingdom, for the Scotland region.

== Other activities ==
John Edward served on the Presiding Officer of the Scottish Parliament's Commission on Parliamentary Reform which produced a Report on how the Scottish Parliament can engage better with the people of Scotland and how its work can be improved to deliver better scrutiny in 2017.

He was a member of the Steel Commission on “Moving Towards Federalism” from 2003 to 2006, and a member of the Campbell Commission on “Home and Community Rule” from 2011 to 2012.

John Edward is vice-chair of the Stockbridge and Inverleith Community Council.

He was a trustee of the Scottish European Educational Trust, a non-political charity which promoted education about Europe, languages and the wider world and which ceased operations in 2024.

He is a member of the Scotland committees of the European Movement and Liberal International.

He has written for Alcohol Change UK and was involved in the centenary commemoration of the Quintinshill rail disaster.

He is a board member of the Association of Governing Boards of Independent Schools, and member of the Scottish Commission on School Reform, hosted by Reform Scotland. Colleges Scotland published an article in 2023 on the International potential of Scotland's Colleges.
