= Louis Stedman-Bryce =

German politician, director, property investor (born 1974)

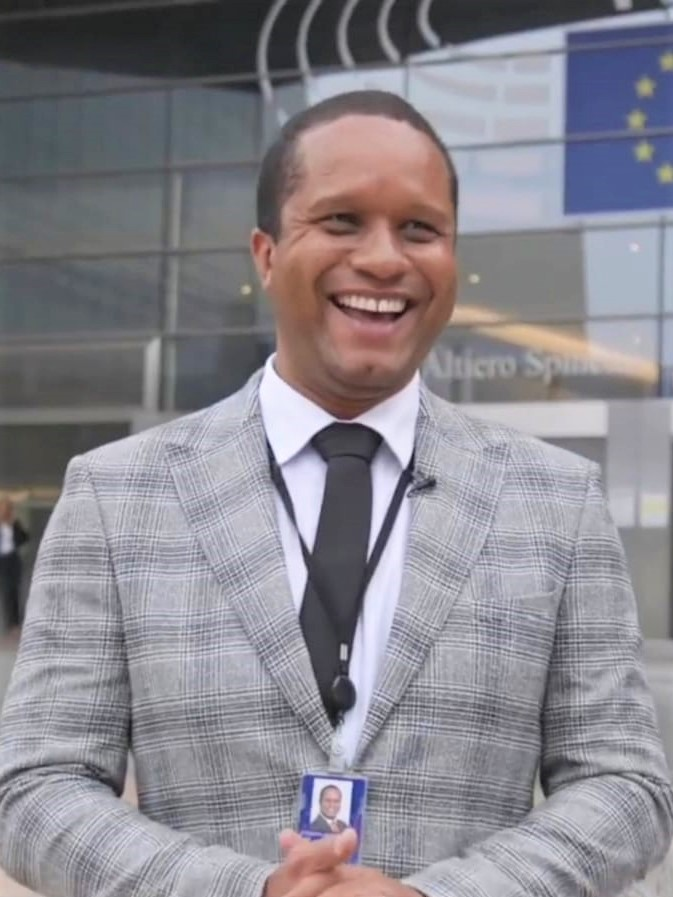
- Stedman-Bryce in 2019

Member of the European Parliament for Scotland
- In office 2 July 2019 – 31 January 2020
- Preceded by: Catherine Stihler
- Succeeded by: Constituency abolished

Personal details
- Born: December 1974 (age 51)
- Party: Independent (since 2019; before 2019)
- Other political affiliations: Brexit (2019)
- Spouse: Gavin Stedman-Bryce
- Occupation: Care home director and property investor

Louis Stedman-Bryce (born December 1974) is a British care home director, property investor and former politician. He served as a Member of the European Parliament (MEP) for Scotland from 2019 to 2020. He was elected as a Brexit Party candidate but left the party in November 2019 to sit as an independent.

== Early life and career ==
Stedman-Bryce was born in December 1974 to a Jamaican father and British mother and grew up in Kent, England, before moving to Scotland. A care home director and property investor, he is the co-founder of iNkfish Capital and a director of iNkfish Care and iNkfish Property Developments.

== Political career ==
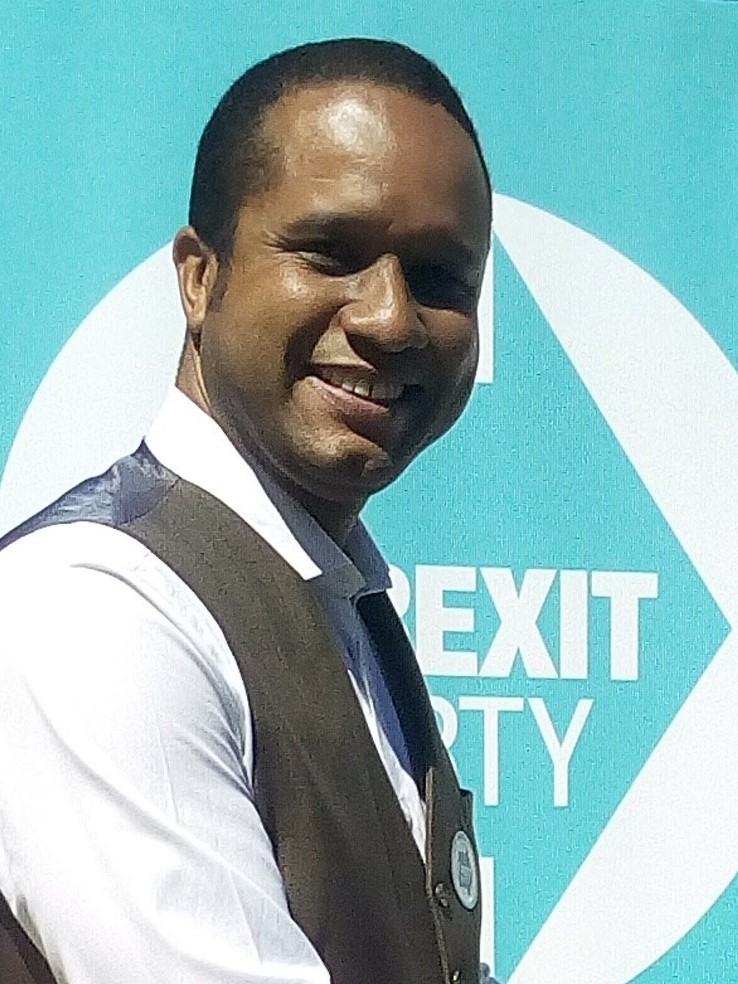
Stedman-Bryce as a Brexit Party candidate

As a candidate for the Brexit Party, Stedman-Bryce was elected to the European Parliament for the Scotland constituency in the 2019 European Parliament election and took his seat on 2 July 2019, becoming the first ever black parliamentarian elected in Scotland. On the left of the party, he stated he would never have joined the UK Independence Party and wanted the Brexit Party to be a "broad church".

Stedman-Bryce was briefly his party's prospective parliamentary candidate (PPC) for Glasgow North East in the 2019 general election. However, he stood down in protest at Nigel Farage's decision not to stand candidates in Conservative-held seats. Stedman-Bryce claimed this was enabling Boris Johnson to deliver a flawed Brexit withdrawal agreement.

Days after standing down as a general election candidate, Stedman-Bryce left the Brexit Party altogether to sit as an independent MEP after taking issue with the party's candidate screening process. He remained an MEP until the UK's withdrawal from the European Union on 31 January 2020.

During his time in the European Parliament, Stedman-Bryce was ranked the sixth highest earning MEP within the Brexit Party just behind Nigel Farage who was fifth. He was the first and only gay black man to ever represent the United Kingdom in the European Parliament.

== Personal life ==
Stedman-Bryce is openly gay and married to his business partner Gavin.
