= Alex Falconer (Scottish politician) =

British politician (1940–2012)

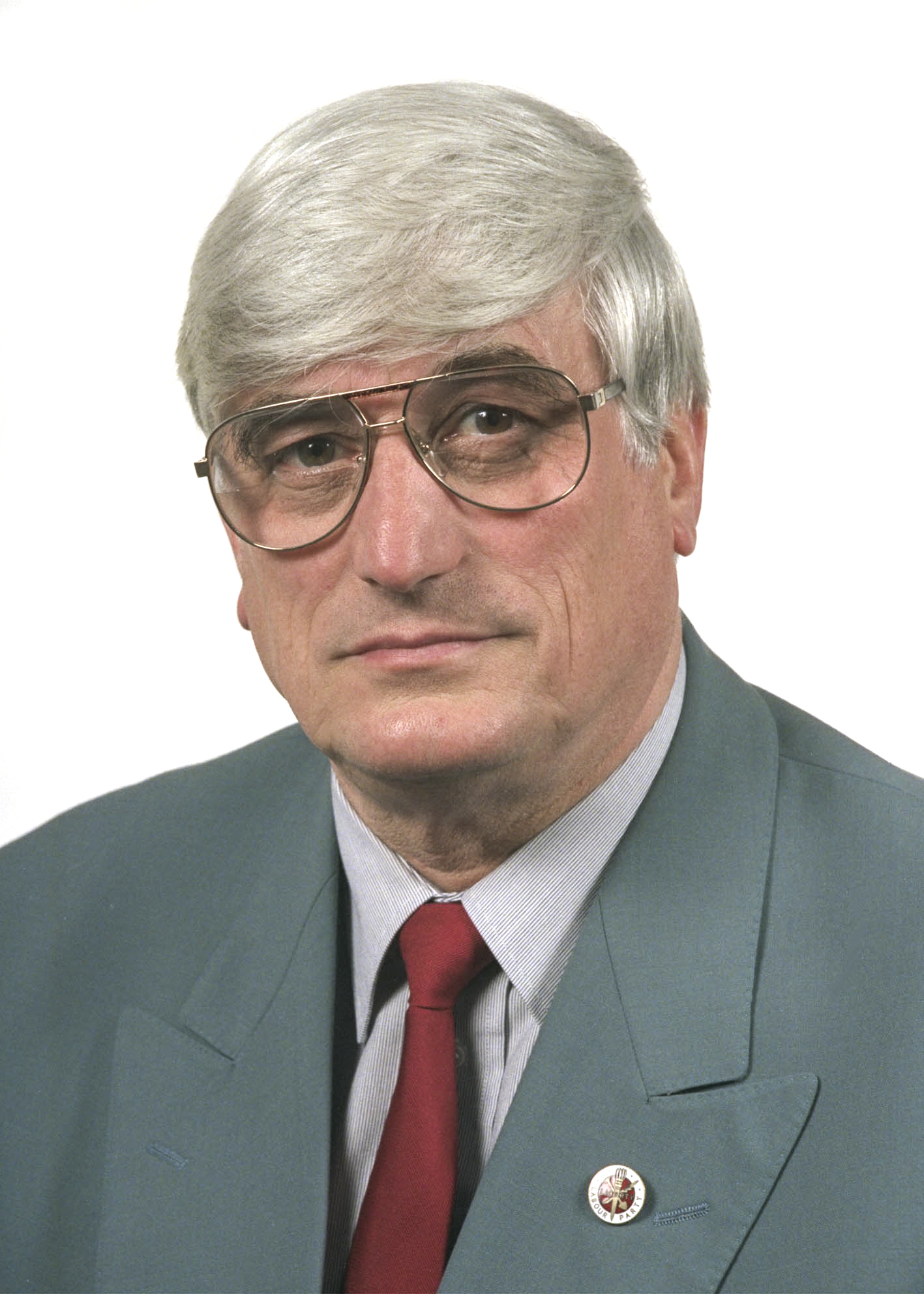
- Falconer in 1994

Member of the European Parliament for Mid Scotland and Fife
- In office 14 June 1984 – 10 June 1999
- Preceded by: John Purvis
- Succeeded by: Constituency abolished

Personal details
- Born: Alexander C. Falconer; 1 April 1940
- Died: 12 August 2012 (aged 72)
- Party: Labour
- Other political affiliations: Campaign for Socialism
- Spouse: Margaret Falconer

Alexander C. Falconer (1 April 1940 – 12 August 2012) was a Scottish Labour Party politician. He was the Member of the European Parliament (MEP) for Mid Scotland and Fife from 1984 to 1999.

He was a campaigner on international development, globalisation, equalities, human rights and environmental issues. He was prominent in leading a number of campaigns throughout the Margaret Thatcher years, including against the poll tax and water privatisation.

== Early life and career ==
Born in 1940, Alex Falconer left school without any formal qualifications. His first employment was as a lodge boy in the Blackness Foundry in Dundee. After being made redundant in 1958, he joined the Royal Navy, in which he served for nine years. After a short period as a labourer in the Ministry of Public Building and Works, and a year as a stoker in a Dunfermline hospital, he joined Rosyth Dockyard as a lagger in 1969. He became a shop steward in 1970, and served on many negotiating committees in the Civil Service.

== Political career ==
Falconer joined the Labour Party in 1973, and was a Scottish Labour Party Conference delegate, on behalf of the Transport and General Workers' Union, from 1975 until he was elected as an MEP. He also served as chairman of Fife Trades Council.

In the European Parliament, he supported the cause of striking miners against the Thatcher government and the cause of people who had contracted pleural plaque because of exposure to asbestos, having set a legal precedent when he took forward his own case. He foiled proposals for European secrecy laws by getting himself made rapporteur and then being unable to complete his report because the information he requested was not made available. He also made himself a target for neo-fascist ire, after campaigning against a visit to Edinburgh by Jean-Marie Le Pen of the French National Front. His aide for five years was the newly-graduated Richard Leonard, a future Leader of the Scottish Labour Party.

He was a staunch supporter of the founding principles of the Labour Party, fighting for the retention of Labour's commitment to common ownership and redistribution. He supported Tony Benn in the 1988 Labour Party leadership election and was a founding member of the Scottish Labour grouping Campaign for Socialism in 1994.

During his period of office, he served on several European Parliamentary committees – Economic Monetary and Industrial Policy; Environmental and Public Health and Safety; Legal Affairs and Citizens Rights; Regional Policy; and External Trade and Relations.

== Death ==
Following the announcement of Falconer's death, tributes were made by former Prime Minister Gordon Brown and Scottish Labour leader Johann Lamont.

== Publications ==
- "Publications by Alex Falconer", pamphlets including "The Democratic Deficit" (1991), "Usage and Abusage of the Wealth of Nations" (1992), "Global Village Economics" (1995), "Beyond the Wealth of Nations" (1997), and "The Ill Divided World" (1999).

European Parliament
Preceded by John Purvis	Member of the European Parliament for Mid Scotland & Fife; 1984 – 1999	Constituency abolished
