= Duncan Ross (Scottish politician) =

Scottish politician and academic

Duncan Ross is a Scottish nationalist political activist and Professor of Economic and Social History.

Ross studied at the University of Glasgow and the London School of Economics. He joined the Scottish National Party (SNP) in 1987, and was elected as the party's national secretary in 2006. He stood for the party in Coatbridge, Chryston and Bellshill at the 2005 general election, taking second place with 13.6% of the votes cast, then in Cunninghame South at the 2007 Scottish Parliament election, taking second place, with 34.6% of the vote. He was fifth on the party list for the 2009 European Parliament election, but only the top two candidates were elected.

In 2009, Ross was a leading supporter of an independent Scotland joining the Euro, arguing that the SNP's manifesto should commit to this, rather than stating that the matter would be put to a referendum. In 2014, he was an organiser of an event promoted by Republic, putting the case for an independent Scotland to be a republic.

Ross works as a Professor of Economic and Social History, as well as the Dean of Learning & Teaching in the College of Social Sciences at the University of Glasgow.

Party political offices
Preceded by Alasdair Allan	National Secretary of the Scottish National Party; 2006–2009	Succeeded by William Henderson
