= Sheila Ritchie =

British politician (born 1957)

Sheila Ritchie MBE
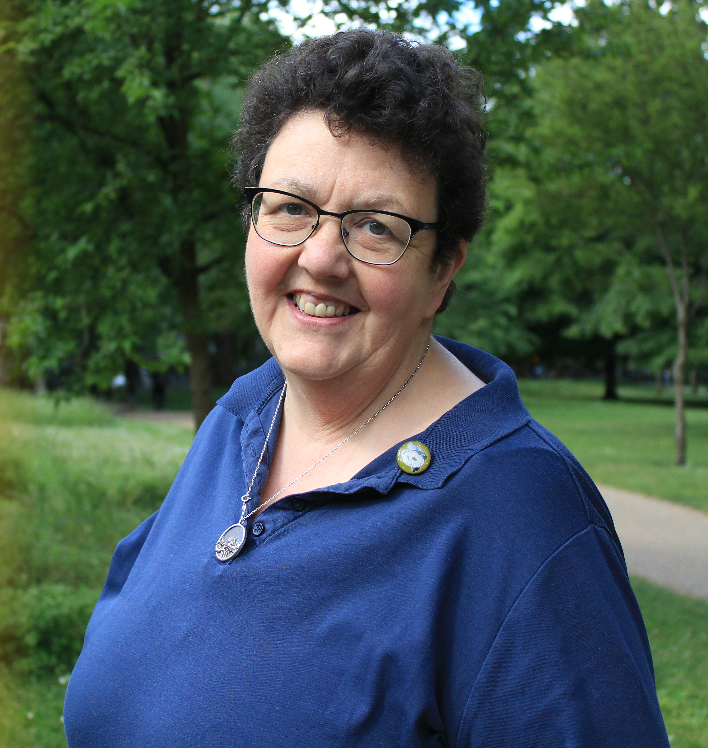
- Ritchie in 2019

Member of the European Parliament for Scotland
- In office 2 July 2019 – 31 January 2020
- Succeeded by: Constituency abolished

Personal details
- Born: 18 May 1957 (age 69) Perth, Scotland
- Party: Liberal Democrat

Sheila Ewan Ritchie MBE (born 18 May 1957) is a Scottish Liberal Democrat politician and solicitor, who served as a Member of the European Parliament (MEP) for the Scotland constituency from 2019 to 2020.

== Career ==
She is a retired Solicitor of an Aberdeen law firm, and was formerly a Councillor and the leader of Gordon District Council.

She was a Scottish Government appointee to the European Economic and Social Committee between 2000 and 2003.

She is a Trustee of the sustainable land development non-profit, The Macaulay Development Trust, the arts-based charity for care-experienced young people, Articulate Cultural Trust, and Aberdeen community charity Celebrate Aberdeen.

=== Member of the European Parliament ===
Ritchie was elected as a Member of the European Parliament for the Scotland constituency in the 2019 European Parliament election. As a Liberal Democrat, she sat with Renew Europe group. From July 2019, she was a member of the European Parliament Committee on Budgetary Control and the European Parliament Committee on Agriculture and Rural Development. She served as an MEP until the 31 January 2020, when the Brexit process was completed.

=== Post 2020 ===
Ritchie stood in Moray at the 2021 Scottish Parliament election and was also the fifth candidate on the list vote for the Highlands and Islands region.

Ritchie was appointed Member of the Order of the British Empire (MBE) in the 2023 New Year Honours for political service in Scotland.

Ritchie was appointed as a Commissioner for the Electoral Commission in February 2024.
