= Ian Dalziel (politician) =

British businessman and politician (born 1947)

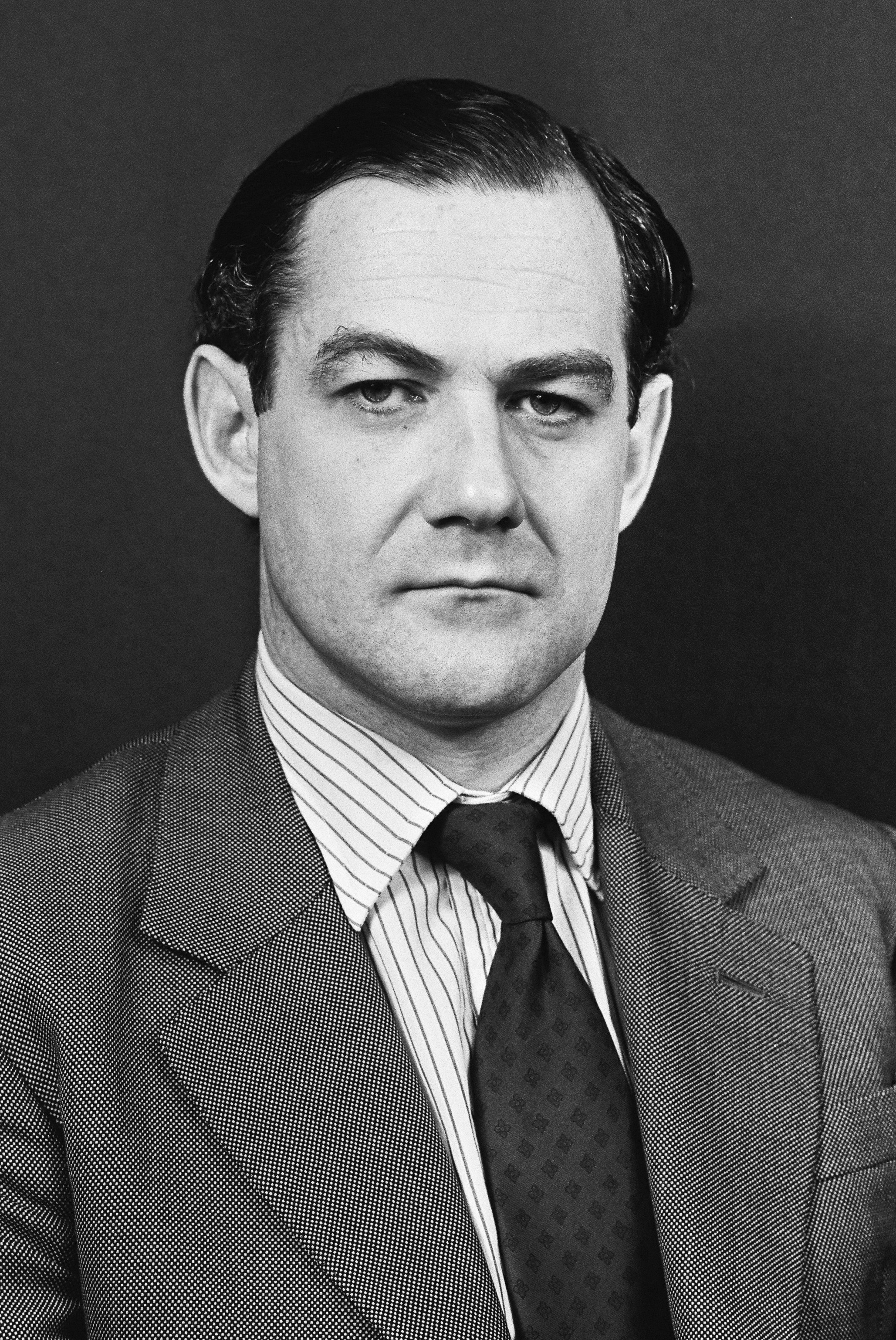
European Parliament portrait

Ian Martin Dalziel (pronounced /diˈɛl/; born 21 June 1947) is a British businessman and politician who served one term as a Conservative Member of the European Parliament from 1979 to 1984.

Dalziel was educated at Daniel Stewart's College in Edinburgh and St John's College, Cambridge, before studying as a postgraduate at the Université libre de Bruxelles and London Business School. He worked for Mullens & Co from 1970, before moving to a management position at Manufacturers Hanover Ltd. In 1978 he was elected as a Conservative to Richmond-upon-Thames Council for Barnes ward.

His involvement in international business led him to seek election to the European Parliament at the first election in 1979, and he was unexpectedly elected for the Lothians constituency which included his birthplace of Edinburgh. He stood down after one five-year term, due to pressure of business: in 1983 he had become the co-founder of Adam & Company, a start-up private bank subsequently acquired by Royal Bank of Scotland, and following a merger, became chairman of Continental Assets Trust plc.

In 1989 Dalziel became a director of Lepercq-Amcur Fund NV, and he has chaired the board of C.S.I., Inc., since 1992. He was appointed to the board of Precision Systems Inc. in 1996. In 1998 he was a defendant in a dismissed class action suit by shareholders of Precision Systems.
