= Mid Scotland and Fife (European Parliament constituency) =

Former European Parliament constituency

- European Parliament constituency

- Mid Scotland and Fife's location within Scotland (1979-1984)
- Member state: United Kingdom
- Electorate: 546,060
- Created: 1979
- Dissolved: 1999
- MEPs: 1

Mid Scotland and Fife was a European Parliament constituency in the United Kingdom prior to the uniform adoption of proportional representation in the UK in 1999. The United Kingdom had previously used first-past-the-post for the European elections in England, Scotland and Wales. The European Parliament constituencies used under that system were smaller than the later regional constituencies and only had one Member of the European Parliament each.

Boundary within Scotland (1984–1999)

== Boundaries ==
1979-1984: Clackmannan and East Stirlingshire, Dunfermline, Fife Central, Fife East, Kinross and West Perthshire, Kirkcaldy, Perth and East Perthshire, Stirling, Falkirk and Grangemouth, Stirlingshire West.
1984-1999: Central Fife, Clackmannan, Dunfermline East, Dunfermline West, Falkirk East, Falkirk West, Kirkcaldy, North East Fife, Perth and Kinross, Stirling.

The 1979-1984 boundaries exactly mirror the boundaries of the present-day Scottish Parliament electoral region of the same name.

== Members of the European Parliament ==
Elected	Member	Party
1979	John Purvis	Conservative
1984	Alex Falconer	Labour
1989	Alex Falconer	Labour
1994	Alex Falconer	Labour

== Election results ==
European elections 1994: Mid Scotland and Fife
Party	Candidate	Votes	%	±%
Labour	Alex Falconer	95,667	45.8	–0.3
SNP	Dick Douglas	64,254	30.8	+8.2
Conservative	Peter W.B. Page	28,192	13.5	–7.4
Liberal Democrats	Heather S. Lyall	17,192	8.2	+4.2
Green	Mark J. Johnston	3,015	1.4	−5.0
Natural Law	Tom J. Pringle	532	0.3	New
Majority		31,413	15.0	–8.5
Turnout		208,852	38.2	–3.3
Labour hold		Swing	–4.3	

European elections 1989: Mid Scotland and Fife
Party	Candidate	Votes	%	±%
Labour	Alex Falconer	102,246	46.1	+3.5
SNP	Kenny MacAskill	50,089	22.6	+6.3
Conservative	Alan F. Christie	46,505	20.9	–7.3
Green	George C. Morton	14,165	6.4	New
SLD	Malcolm Black	8,857	4.0	−8.9
Majority		52,157	23.5	+9.1
Turnout		221,862	41.5	+6.0
Labour hold		Swing	–1.4	

European elections 1984: Mid Scotland and Fife
Party	Candidate	Votes	%	±%
Labour	Alex Falconer	80,038	42.6	+11.4
Conservative	John Purvis	52,872	28.2	–6.9
SNP	Janette Jones	30,511	16.3	–7.8
SDP	Alexander A.I. Wedderburn	24,220	12.9	+3.3
Majority		27,166	14.4	N/A
Turnout		187,641	35.5	+0.5
Labour gain from Conservative		Swing	+9.2	

European elections 1979: Mid Scotland and Fife
Party	Candidate	Votes	%	±%
Conservative	John Purvis	66,255	35.1	
Labour	Mary Panko	58,768	31.2	
SNP	Robert McIntyre	45,426	24.1	
Liberal	J.M. Calder	18,112	9.6	
Majority		7,487	3.9	
Turnout		188,561	35.0	
Conservative win (new seat)				
