= Elections in Scotland =

Scotland has elections to several bodies: the Scottish Parliament, the United Kingdom Parliament, local councils and community councils. Before the United Kingdom left the European Union, Scotland elected members to the European Parliament.

== Scottish Parliament ==
Scottish Parliamentary elections use the Additional Member System (AMS). Under this system, voters are given two votes: one for their constituency, which elects a single MSP by first-past-the-post; and one for their region, which elects seven MSPs by closed list. Five Scottish Parliamentary elections have been held since the reconvention of the Scottish Parliament in 1999. Elections are held every five years, on the first Thursday in May.

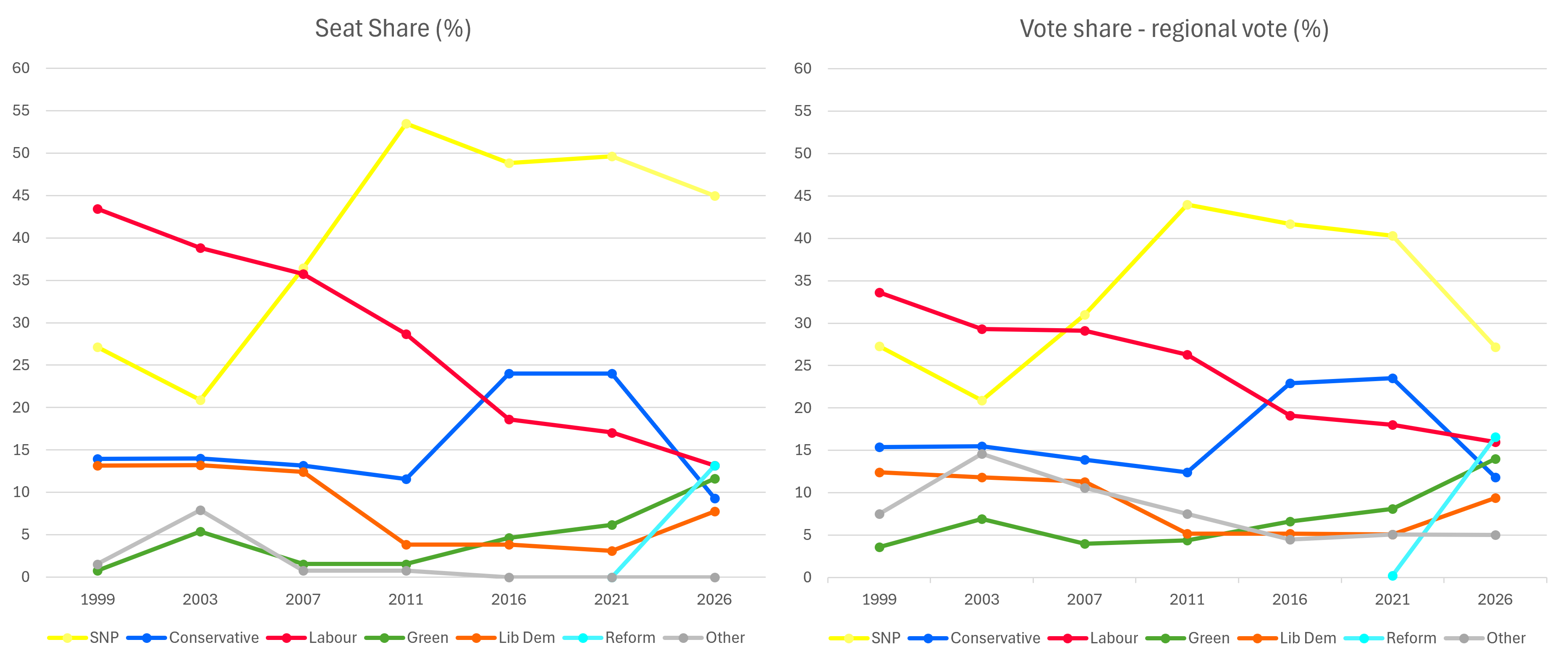
Scottish Parliament election results

=== 2026 ===
Party	Seats	Seats change	Constituency votes	Constituency votes, of total (%)	Constituency vote change (%)	Regional votes	Regional votes, of total (%)	Regional vote change (%)	Total votes	Total votes, (%)	Total votes change (%)	Seats won, of total (%)
SNP	58	▼6	877,077	38.2	▼9.5	625,949	27.2	▼13.1	1,503,026	32.7	▼11.19	44.96
Labour	17	▼5	440,708	19.2	▼2.4	368,785	16.0	▼1.9	809,493	17.6	▼2.14	13.18
Reform	17	▲17	361,994	15.8	New	383,425	16.6	▲16.4	745,419	16.2	▲16.2	13.18
Green	15	▲7	52,528	2.3	▲1.0	321,964	14.0	▲5.9	374,492	8.14	▲3.45	11.63
Conservative	12	▼19	271,740	11.8	▼10.1	271,550	11.8	▼11.7	543,290	11.8	▼10.82	9.3
Liberal Democrats	10	▲6	261,408	11.4	▲4.4	216,224	9.4	▲4.3	477,632	10.38	▲4.41	7.75
Other	0	Steady	31,704	1.38	▲0.80	115,615	5.02	▼0.08	147,319	3.20	▲0.37	0.0
			2,297,159	100		2,303,512	100		4,600,671	100		
Registered voters/Turnout			4,320,981	53.16	▼10.3	4,320,981	53.30	▼10.19	8,641,962	53.23	▼10.24	

=== 2021 ===
Party	Seats	Seats change	Constituency votes	Constituency votes, of total (%)	Constituency vote change (%)	Regional votes	Regional votes, of total (%)	Regional vote change (%)	Total votes	Total votes, (%)	Total votes change (%)	Seats won, of total (%)
SNP	64	▲1	1,291,204	47.7	▲1.2	1,094,374	40.3	▼1.4	2,385,578	43.89	▼0.21	49.6
Conservative	31	Steady	592,518	21.9	▼0.1	637,131	23.5	▲0.6	1,229,649	22.62	▲0.15	24.0
Labour	22	▼2	584,392	21.6	▼1.0	488,819	18.0	▼1.0	1,073,211	19.74	▼1.07	17.05
Green	8	▲2	34,990	1.3	▲0.7	220,324	8.1	▲1.5	255,314	4.69	▲1.11	6.2
Liberal Democrats	4	▼1	187,746	6.9	▼0.9	137,152	5.1	▼0.1	324,898	5.97	▼0.54	3.1
Other	0	Steady	15,833	0.58	▲0.08	137,984	5.1	▲0.6	153,817	2.83	▲0.34	0.0
			2,706,761	100		2,712,784	100		5,434,851	100		
Registered voters/Turnout			4,280,785	63.46	▲7.66	4,280,785	63.49	▲7.69	8,561,570	63.47	▲7.67	

=== 2016 ===
A map showing the constituency winners of the Election by their party colours.
Party	Seats	Seats change	Constituency votes	Constituency votes, of total (%)	Constituency vote change (%)	Regional votes	Regional votes, of total (%)	Regional vote change (%)	Total votes	Total votes, (%)	Total votes change (%)	Seats won, of total (%)
SNP	63	▼6	1,059,897	46.5	▲1.1	953,587	41.7	▼2.3	2,013,484	44.10	▼0.60	48.8
Conservative	31	▲16	501,844	22.0	▲8.1	524,222	22.9	▲10.6	1,026,066	22.47	▲9.34	24.03
Labour	24	▼13	514,261	22.6	▼9.2	435,919	19.1	▼7.2	950,180	20.81	▼8.18	18.60
Green	6	▲4	13,172	0.6	▲0.6	150,426	6.6	▲2.2	163,598	3.58	▲1.40	4.65
Liberal Democrats	5	Steady	178,238	7.8	▼1.0	119,284	5.2	Steady	297,522	6.51	▼0.04	3.87
Other	0	▼1	11,741	0.5	▼0.58	102,314	4.5	▼3.02	114,055	2.49	▼1.89	0
			2,279,154	100		2,285,752	100		4,564,906	100		
Registered voters/Turnout			4,099,907	55.90	▲5.24	4,099,907	55.75	▲5.36	5,434,851	55.67	▲5.30	

=== 2011 ===
Party	Seats	Seats change	Constituency votes	Constituency votes, of total (%)	Constituency vote change (%)	Regional votes	Regional votes, of total (%)	Regional vote change (%)	Total votes	Total votes, (%)	Total votes change (%)	Seats won, of total (%)
SNP	69	▲23	902,915	45.5	▲12.5	876,421	44.0	▲13.0	1,779,336	44.70	▲12.74	53.48
Labour	37	▼7	630,461	31.7	▼0.5	523,469	26.3	▼2.9	1,153,930	28.99	▼1.64	28.68
Conservative	15	▼5	276,652	13.9	▼2.7	245,967	12.4	▼1.5	522,619	13.13	▼2.01	11.6
Liberal Democrats	5	▼12	157,714	7.9	▼8.2	103,472	5.2	▼6.1	261,186	6.56	▼7.18	3.87
Green	2	▲1	0	0.0	▼0.1	86,939	4.4	▲0.3	86,939	2.18	▲0.08	1.55
Other	1	Steady	21,534	1.08	▼0.92	149,809	7.52	▼3.08	171,343	4.30	▲2.03	0.77
			1,989,276	100		1,990,836	100		3,980,112	100		
Registered voters/Turnout			3,950,626	50.35	▼0.70	3,950,626	50.39	▼1.31	7,901,252	50.37	▼1.01	

=== 2007 ===
A map showing the constituency winners of the Election by their party colours.
Party	Seats	Seats change	Constituency votes	Constituency votes, of total (%)	Constituency vote change (%)	Regional votes	Regional votes, of total (%)	Regional vote change (%)	Total votes	Total votes, (%)	Total votes change (%)	Seats won, of total (%)
SNP	47	▲20	664,227	32.9	▲9.1	633,611	31.0	▲10.1	1,297,838	31.96	▲9.65	36.43
Labour	46	▼4	648,374	32.1	▼2.5	595,415	29.1	▼0.2	1,243,789	30.63	▼1.36	35.65
Conservative	17	▼1	334,743	16.6	Steady	284,035	13.9	▼1.6	614,778	15.14	▼0.91	13.17
Liberal Democrats	16	▼1	326,232	16.2	▲0.8	230,651	11.3	▼0.5	556,883	13.74	▲0.17	12.40
Green	2	▼5	2,971	0.1	▲8.5	82,577	4.0	▼2.9	85,584	2.10	▼1.34	1.55
Other	1	▼9	40,431	2.0	▼7.6	216,577	10.6	▼4.0	257,008	6.33	▼6.31	0.77
			2,016,978	100		2,042,866	100		4,059,844	100		
Registered voters/Turnout			3,950,626	51.05	▲1.63	3,950,626	51.70	▲2.30	7,901,252	51.38	▲1.89	

(Liberal Democrats won Dunfermline West, not Labour)

=== 2003 ===
A map showing the constituency winners of the Election by their party colours.
Party	Seats	Seats change	Constituency votes	Constituency votes, of total (%)	Constituency vote change (%)	Regional votes	Regional votes, of total (%)	Regional vote change (%)	Total votes	Total votes, (%)	Total votes change (%)	Seats won, of total (%)
Labour	50	▼6	663,585	34.6	▼4.2	561,375	29.3	▼4.3	1,224,960	31.96	▼4.25	38.8
SNP	27	▼8	455,722	23.8	▼5.1	399,659	20.9	▼6.4	855,381	22.31	▼5.70	20.9
Conservative	18	Steady	318,279	16.6	▲1.0	296,929	15.5	▼0.1	615,208	16.05	▲0.60	14.0
Liberal Democrats	17	Steady	294,347	15.4	▲1.2	225,774	11.8	▼0.6	520,121	13.57	▲0.25	13.2
Green	7	▲6	-	-	-	132,138	6.9	▲3.3	132,138	3.44	▲1.65	5.4
Other	10	▲8	184,641	9.6	▲6.9	299,946	14.6	▲7.1	484,587	12.64	▲7.45	7.9
			1,916,574	100		1,915,821	100		3,832,395	100		
Registered voters/Turnout			3,877,460	49.42	▼8.74	3,877,460	49.40	▼8.57	7,754,920	49.49	▼8.62	

=== 1999 ===
A map showing the constituency winners of the Election by their party colours.
Party	Seats	Constituency votes	Constituency votes, of total (%)	Regional votes	Regional votes, of total (%)	Total votes	Total votes, (%)	Seats won, of total (%)
Labour	56	908,346	38.8	786,818	33.6	1,695,164	36.21	43.41
SNP	35	672,768	28.7	638,644	27.3	1,311,412	28.01	27.13
Conservative	18	364,425	15.6	359,109	15.4	723,534	15.45	13.95
Liberal Democrats	17	333,179	14.2	290,760	12.4	623,939	13.32	13.17
Green	1	-	-	84,023	3.6	84,023	1.79	0.77
Other	2	63,770	2.7	179,481	7.5	243,251	5.19	1.55
		2,342,488	100	2,338,835	100	4,681,323	100	
Registered voters/Turnout		4,027,433	58.16	4,027,433	57.97	8,054,866	58.11	

=== By-elections ===
- 2019 Shetland by-election, Lib Dem hold
- 2017 Ettrick, Roxburgh and Berwickshire by-election, Con hold
- 2014 Cowdenbeath by-election, Lab hold
- 2013 Dunfermline by-election, Lab gain from SNP
- 2013 Aberdeen Donside by-election, SNP hold
- 2006 Moray by-election, SNP hold
- 2005 Glasgow Cathcart by-election, Lab hold
- 2001 Banff and Buchan by-election, SNP hold
- 2001 Strathkelvin and Bearsden by-election, Lab hold
- 2000 Glasgow Anniesland by-election, Lab hold
- 2000 Ayr by-election, Con gain from Lab

== UK Parliament ==
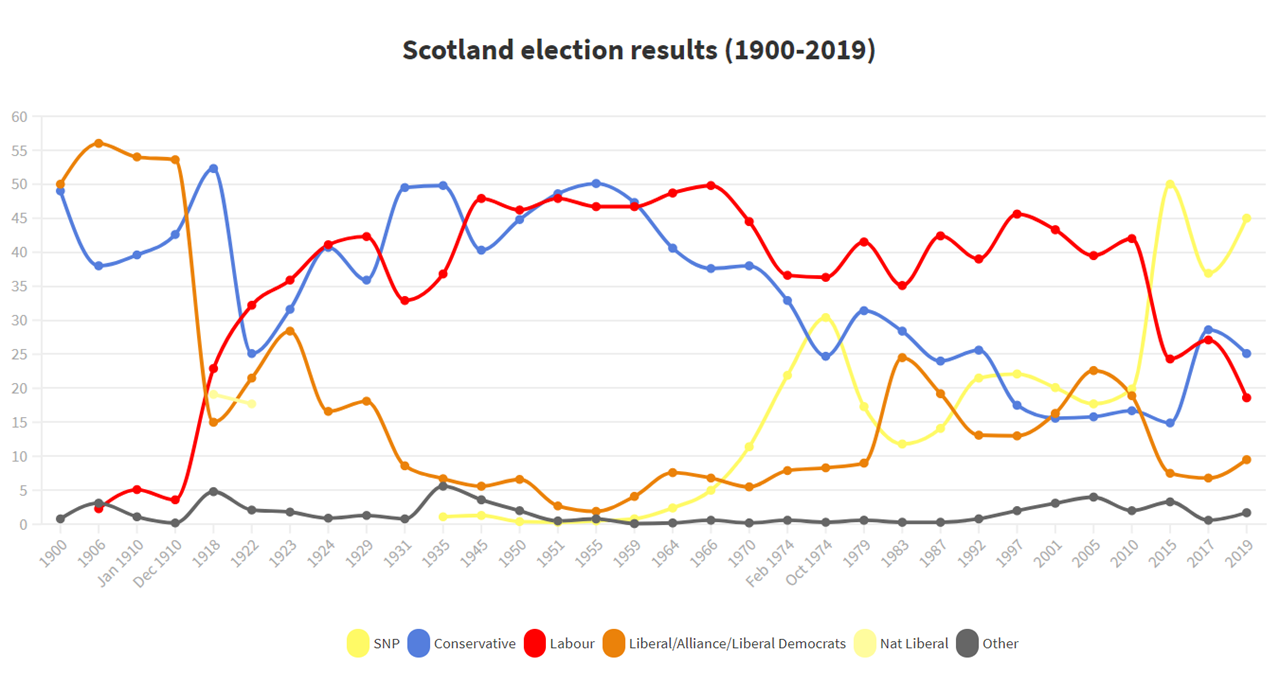
Scotland election results by percentage of popular vote, 1900–2019. Conservative total includes Liberal Unionists 1900–1910 and Liberal Nationals 1931–1964. Liberal total incorporates Liberal Party (1900–1979), Alliance (1983–1987) and Liberal Democrats (since 1992).

=== 2024 ===
2024 Map

Party	Seats	Seats change	Seats contested	Votes	Votes, of total (%)	Change (%)
Labour	37	▲36	57	851,897	35.3	▲16.7
SNP	9	▼39	57	724,758	30.0	▼15.0
Conservative	5	▼1	57	307,344	12.7	▼12.4
Liberal Democrats	6	▲4	57	234,228	9.7	▲0.2
Reform	0	New	57	167,979	7.0	▲6.5
Green	0	Steady	44	92,685	3.8	▲2.8
Other	0	Steady		35,919	1.5	▲1.4
Turnout				2,414,810	59.2	▼8.4

=== 2019 ===
2019 Map

Party	Seats	Seats change	Seats contested	Votes	Votes, of total (%)	Change (%)
SNP	48	▲13	59 (Note: Kirkcaldy and Cowdenbeath candidate Neale Hanvey was suspended before the election but appeared on ballot papers as an SNP candidate.)	1,242,380	45.0	▲8.1
Conservative	6	▼7	59 (Note: Aberdeen North candidate Ryan Houghton and Glasgow Central candidate Flora Scarabello were both suspended before the election but appeared on the ballot paper as Conservative candidates.)	692,939	25.1	▼3.5
Liberal Democrats	4	Steady	59	263,417	9.5	▲2.8
Labour	1	▼6	59 (Note: Falkirk candidate Safia Ali was suspended before the election but appeared on ballot papers as a Labour candidate.)	511,838	18.6	▼8.5
Green	0	Steady	22	28,122	1.0	▲0.8
Brexit Party	0	Steady	15	13,243	0.5	New
UKIP	0	Steady	6	3,303	0.1	▼0.1
Other	0	Steady		3,819	0.1	▼0.2
Turnout				2,759,061	68.1	▲1.7

=== 2017 ===
2017 Map

Party	Seats	Seats change	Seats contested	Votes	Votes, of total (%)	Change (%)
SNP	35	▼21	59	977,569	36.9	▼13.1
Conservative	13	▲12	59	757,949	28.6	▲13.7
Labour	7	▲6	59*	717,007	27.1	▲2.8
Liberal Democrats	4	▲3	59	179,061	6.8	▼0.7
Green	0	Steady	3	5,886	0.2	▼1.1
UKIP	0	Steady	10	5,302	0.2	▼1.4
Other	0	Steady	Steady	6,921	0.3	Steady
Turnout				2,649,695	66.4	▼4.7

=== 2015 ===
2015 Map

At the 2015 election the SNP won a majority of Scottish seats for the first time.

Party	Seats	Seats change	Seats, of total (%)	Seats contested	Votes	Votes, of total (%)	Change (%)
SNP	56	▲50	94.6	59	1,454,436	50.0	▲30.1
Labour	1	▼40	1.7	59*	707,147	24.3	▼17.7
Conservative	1	0	1.7	59	434,097	14.9	▼1.8
Liberal Democrats	1	▼10	1.7	59	219,675	7.5	▼11.3
UKIP	0	Steady	0	41	47,078	1.6	▲0.9
Green	0	Steady	0	32	39,205	1.3	▲0.7
Other	0	Steady	0	37	8,827	0.3	▼0.5
Turnout					2,910,465	71.1	▲6.3

=== 2010 ===
2010 Map

Party	Seats	Seats change	Seats, of total (%)	Candidates	Votes	%	% change
Labour	41	Steady	69.4	59	1,035,528	42.0	▲2.5
Liberal Democrats	11	Steady	18.6	59	465,471	18.9	▼3.7
SNP	6	Steady	10.16	59	491,386	19.9	▲2.3
Conservative	1	Steady	1.69	59*	412,855	16.7	▲0.9
UKIP	0	Steady	0	34	17,223	0.7	▲0.3
Green	0	Steady	0	20	16,827	0.7	▼0.4
Other	0	Steady	0	45	19,555	0.8	▲0.14
Turnout:					2,465,722	63.8	▲3.2

^{*} Philip Lardner, the Conservative candidate for North Ayrshire and Arran was disowned by the Conservative Party for comments he posted on his website, calling homosexuality 'abnormal'. It was too late for him to be replaced and he still read as the Scottish Conservative & Unionist Party candidate on the ballot paper.

=== 2005 ===
2005 Map

Party	Seats	Seats change	Seats, of total (%)	Votes	%	% change
Labour	41	▼15	69.4	922,402	39.5	▼4.5
Liberal Democrats	11	▲1	18.6	528,076	22.6	▲6.3
SNP	6	▲1	10.16	412,267	17.7	▼2.4
Conservative	1	Steady	1.7	369,388	15.8	▲0.2
Scottish Socialist	0	Steady	0	43,514	1.9	▼1.2
Green	0	Steady	0	25,760	1.1	▲1.1
UKIP	0	Steady	0	8,859	0.4	▲0.3
Other	0	Steady	0	15,490	0.66	
Turnout:				2,333,887	60.6	▲2.4

=== 2001 ===
2001 Map

Party	Seats	Seats change	Votes	%	% change
Labour	56	Steady	1,001,173	43.3	▼2.3
Liberal Democrats	10	Steady	378,034	16.3	▲3.3
SNP	5	▼1	464,314	20.1	▼2.1
Conservative	1	▲1	360,658	15.6	▼1.9
Scottish Socialist	0	Steady	72,516	3.1	▲2.8
Turnout:			2,315,703	58.2	▼13.1

=== 1997 ===
1997 Map

Party	Seats	Seats change	Votes	%	% change
Labour	56	▲7	1,283,350	45.6	▲6.6
Liberal Democrats	10	▲1	365,362	13.0	▼0.1
SNP	6	▲3	621,550	22.1	▲0.6
Conservative	0	▼11	493,059	17.5	▼8.2
Other	0	Steady	53,427	2.0	▲1.2
Turnout:			2,816,748	71.3	▼4.2

=== 1992 ===
1992 Map

Party	Seats	Seats change	Votes	%	% change
Labour	49	▼1	1,142,911	39.0	▼3.4
Conservative	11	▲1	751,950	25.6	▲1.6
Liberal Democrats	9	Steady	383,856	13.1	▼6.1
SNP	3	Steady	629,564	21.5	▲7.4
Other	0	Steady	23,417	0.8	▲0.5
Turnout:			2,931,698	75.5	▲0.4

=== 1987 ===
1987 Map

Party	Seats	Seats change	Votes	%	% change
Labour	50	▲9	1,258,132	42.4	▲7.3
Conservative	10	▼11	713,081	24.0	▼4.4
Alliance	9	▲1	570,053	19.2	▼5.3
SNP	3	▲1	416,473	14.1	▲2.3
Other	0	Steady	10,069	0.3	Steady
Turnout:			2,967,808	75.1	▲2.4

=== 1983 ===
1983 Map

Party	Seats	Seats change	Votes	%	% change
Labour	41	▼3	990,654	35.1	▼6.5
Conservative	21	▼1	801,487	28.4	▼3.0
Alliance	8	▲5	692,634	24.5	▲15.5
SNP	2	Steady	331,975	11.8	▼5.5
Other	0	Steady	7,830	0.3	▲0.2
Turnout:			2,824,580	72.7	

=== 1979 ===
1979 Map

Party	Seats	Seats change	Votes	%	% change
Labour	44	▲3	1,211,455	41.5	▲5.2
Conservative	22	▲6	916,155	31.4	▲6.7
SNP	2	▼9	504,259	17.3	▼13.1
Liberal	3	Steady	262,224	9.0	▲0.7
SLP	0	Steady	13,737	0.5	New
Other	0	Steady	2,881	0.1	▲0.1
Turnout:			2,916,637	76.84	

=== October 1974 ===
October 1974 Map

Party	Seats	Seats change	Votes	%	% change
Labour	41	▲1	1,000,581	36.3	▼0.3
Conservative	16	▼5	681,327	24.7	▼8.2
SNP	11	▲4	839,617	30.4	▲8.5
Liberal	3	Steady	228,855	8.3	▲0.4
Communist	0	Steady	7,453	0.3	▼0.2
National Front	0	Steady	86	0.0	New
Other	0	Steady	182	0.0	▼0.1
Turnout:			2,758,101	74.81	

=== February 1974 ===
February 1974 Map

Party	Seats	Seats change	Votes	%	% change
Labour	40	▼4	1,057,601	36.6	▼7.9
Conservative	21	▼2	950,668	32.9	▼5.1
SNP	7	▲6	633,180	21.9	▲10.5
Liberal	3	Steady	229,162	7.9	▲2.4
Communist	0	Steady	15,071	0.5	▲0.1
Other	0	Steady	1,393	0.1	▼0.1
Turnout:			2,887,075	78.86	

=== 1970 ===
1970 Map

Party	Seats	Seats change	Votes	%	% change
Labour	44	▼2	1,197,068	44.5	▼5.4
Conservative	23	▲3	1,020,674	38.0	▲0.4
SNP	1	▲1	306,802	11.4	▲6.4
Liberal	3	▼2	147,667	5.5	▼1.3
Communist	0	Steady	11,408	0.4	▼0.2
Other	0	Steady	4,616	0.2	▲0.2
Turnout:			2,688,235	73.91	

=== 1966 ===
1966 Map

Party	Seats	Seats change	Votes	%	% change
Labour	46	▲3	1,273,916	49.9	▲1.2
Conservative	20	▼4	960,675	37.6	▼3.0
Liberal	5	▲1	172,447	6.8	▼0.8
SNP	0	Steady	128,474	5.0	▲2.6
Communist	0	Steady	16,230	0.6	▲0.1
Other	0	Steady	638	0.0	▼0.2
Turnout:			2,552,380		

=== 1964 ===
1964 Map

Party	Seats	Seats change	Votes	%	% Change
Labour Party	43	▲5	1,283,667	48.7	▲2.0
Unionist	24	▼1	981,641	37.3	▼2.5
National Liberal & Conservative	0	▼6	88,054	3.3	▼4.2
Liberal	4	▲3	200,063	7.6	▲3.5
SNP	0	Steady	64,044	2.4	▲1.6
Communist	0	Steady	12,241	0.5	0.0
Other	0	Steady	4,829	0.2	▲0.1
Total	71		2,634,539	100	

=== 1959 ===
1959 Map

Party	Seats	Seats change	Votes	%	% Change
Labour Party	38	▲4	1,245,255	46.7	0.0
Unionist	25	▼5	1,060,609	39.8	▼1.7
National Liberal & Conservative	6	Steady	199,678	7.5	▼1.1
Liberal	1	Steady	108,963	4.1	▲2.1
Independent Unionist	1	▲1	12,163	0.5	New
SNP	0	Steady	21,738	0.8	▲0.3
Communist	0	Steady	12,150	0.5	New
Fife Socialist League	0	Steady	4,886	0.2	New
Other	0	Steady	2,071	0.1	▼0.2
Total	71		2,667,513	100	

=== 1955 ===
1955 Map

Party	Seats	Seats change	Votes	%	% Change
Unionist	30	▲1	1,056,209	41.5	▲1.6
National Liberal & Conservative	6	Steady	217,733	8.6	▼0.1
Labour Party	34	▼1	1,188,058	46.7	▼1.2
Liberal	1	Steady	47,273	1.9	▼0.8
Communist	0	Steady	13,195	0.5	▲0.1
SNP	0	Steady	12,112	0.5	▲0.2
Other	0	Steady	8,674	0.3	▲0.2
Total	71		2,543,254	100	

=== 1951 ===
1951 Map

Party	Seats	Seats change	Votes	%	% Change
Unionist	29	▲3	1,108,321	39.9	▲2.7
National Liberal & Conservative	6	▲1	240,977	8.7	▲1.1
Labour Party	35	▼2	1,330,244	47.9	▲1.7
Liberal	1	▼1	76,291	2.7	▼3.9
Communist	0	Steady	10,947	0.4	▼0.6
SNP	0	Steady	7,299	0.3	▼0.1
Other	0	▼1	3,758	0.1	▼0.9
Total	71		2,777,837	100	

=== 1950 ===
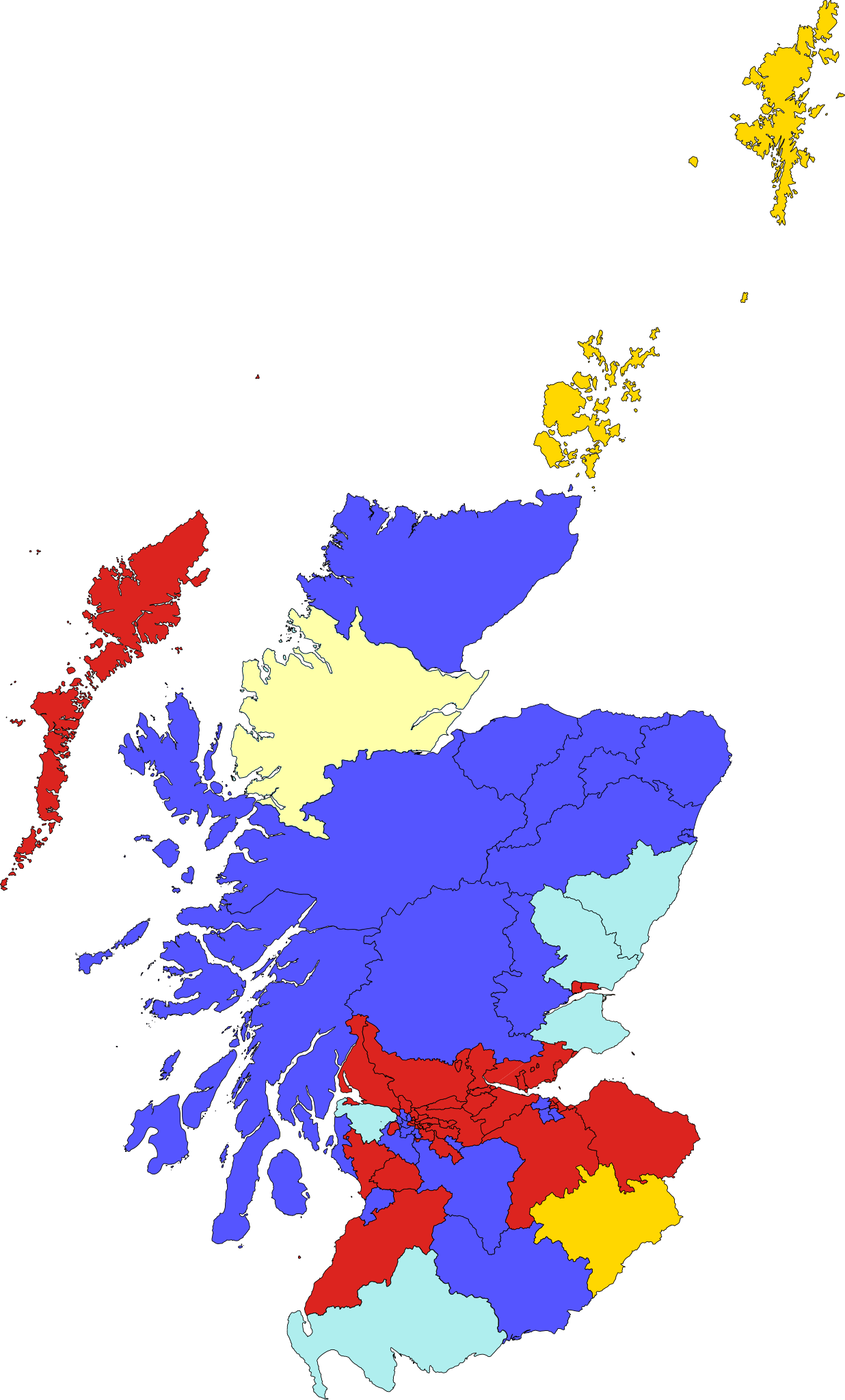
1950 Map

Party	Seats	Seats change	Votes	%	% Change
Labour Party	37	Steady	1,259,410	46.2	▼1.7
Unionist	26	▲2	1,013,909	37.2	▲0.5
National Liberal & Conservative	5	▲2	208,101	7.6	▲4.0
Liberal	2	▲2	180,270	6.6	▲1.0
SNP	0	Steady	9,708	0.4	▼0.9
Communist	0	▼1	27,559	1.0	▼0.4
Other	1	▼2	27,727	1.0	▼0.7
Total	71		2,726,684	100	

=== 1945 ===
1945 Map

Party	Seats	Seats change	Votes	%	% Change
Labour Party	37	▲17	1,144,310	47.9	▲11.1
Unionist	24	▼11	878,206	36.7	▼5.3
National Liberal & Conservative	3	▼4	85,937	3.6	▼3.1
Independent Labour Party	3	▼1	40,725	1.7	▼3.3
Independent Liberal	2	▲2	26,127	1.1	▲1.1
Communist	1	-	33,265	1.4	▲0.8
Independent Unionist	1	▲1	13,647	0.6	▲0.6
Liberal	0	▼3	132,849	5.6	▼1.1
SNP	0	-	30,595	1.3	▲0.2
Common Wealth Party	0	-	4,231	0.2	▲0.2
Total	71		2,389,892	100	

=== 1935 ===
1935 Map

Party	Seats	Seats change	Votes	%	% Change
National Government (Total)	43	▼21	1,135,403	49.8	▼15.2
Unionist	35	▼13	962,595	42.0	▼7.5
National Liberal	7		149,072	6.7	
National Labour	1		19,115	0.9	▼0.1
National	0		4,621	0.2	
Labour Party	20	▲13	863,789	36.8	▲4.2
Liberal	3	▼4	174,235	6.7	▼1.9
Independent Labour Party	4		111,256	5.0	
SNP	0		25,652	1.1	
Communist	1	▲1	13,462	0.6	▼0.8
Total	71		2,323,797	100	

=== 1931 ===
1931 Map

Party	Seats	Seats change	Votes	%	% Change
National Government (Total)	64		1,385,385	64.0	
Unionist	48	▲28	1,056,768	49.5	▲13.6
National Liberal & Conservative	8	New	101,430	4.9	New
Liberal	7	▼6	205,384	8.6	▼9.5
National Labour	1	New	21,803	1.0	New
Labour Party	7	▼30	696,248	32.6	▼9.7
Communist	0	Steady	35,618	1.4	▲0.3
National Party of Scotland	0	Steady	20,954	1.0	▲0.8
New Party	0	New	3,895	0.2	New
Other	0		32,229	0.8	
Total	71		2,174,329	100	

=== 1929 ===
1929 Map

Party	Seats	Seats change	Votes	%	% Change
Labour	37	▲11	931,432	43.1	▲2.0
Unionist	20	▼16	776,397	35.9	▼4.8
Liberal	13	▲5	390,896	18.1	▲1.5
Scottish Prohibition	1	-	25,037	1.2	
Communist	0	-	24,868	1.1	▲0.4
National Party of Scotland	0	-	3,313	0.2	New
Other	0		8,613	0.4	
Total	71		2,161,350	100	

=== 1924 ===
1924 Map

Party	Seats	Seats change	Votes	%	% Change
Unionist	36	▲22	688,299	40.7	▲9.1
Labour	26	▼8	697,146	41.1	▲5.2
Liberal	8	▼14	286,540	16.6	▼11.8
Communist	0	-	15,930	0.7	▼1.7
Other	1	-	29,193	0.9	▼0.8
Total	71		1,717,108	100	

=== 1923 ===
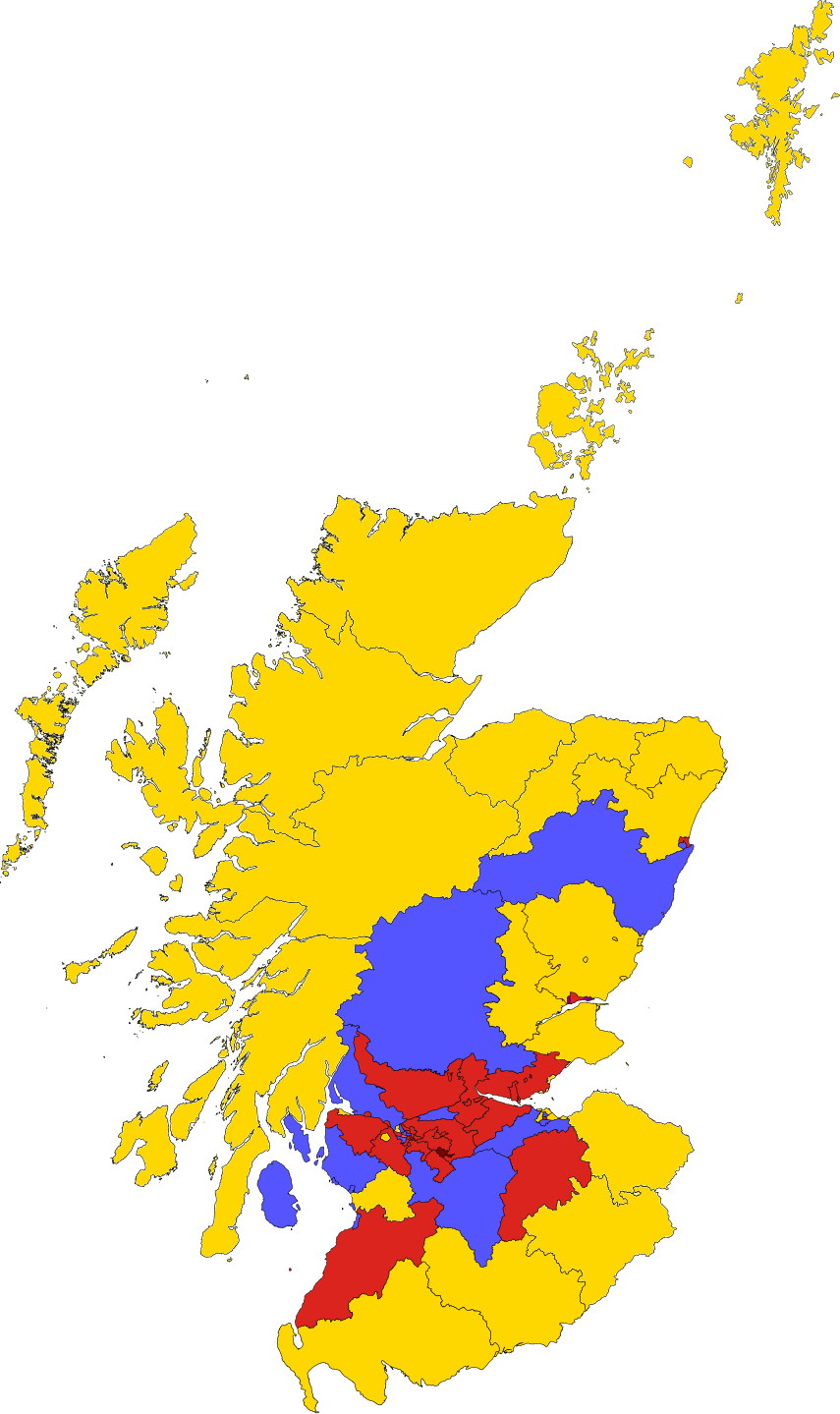
1923 Map

Party	Seats	Seats change	Votes	%	% Change
Labour	34	▲5	532,450	35.9	▲3.7
Liberal (Reunited)	22	▼5	422,995	28.4	▼10.8
Unionist	14	▲1	468,526	31.6	▲6.5
Communist	0	▼1	39,448	2.4	▲1.0
Other	1	-	37,908	1.7	▼0.4
Total	71		1,501,327	100	

=== 1922 ===
1922 Map

Party	Seats	Seats change	Votes	%	% Change
Labour	29	▲23	501,254	32.2	▲9.3
Liberal	15	▲7	328,649	21.5	▲6.1
Unionist	13		379,396	25.1	
National Liberal	12	▼13	288,529	17.7	▼1.4
Communist	1		23,944	1.4	
Other	1		47,589	2.1	
Total	71		1,569,361	100	

=== 1918 ===
1918 Map

Party	Seats	Seats change	Votes	%	% Change
Coalition (Total)	54		584,259	52.3	
Coalition Unionist	28		336,530	30.8	
Coalition Liberal	25		221,145	19.1	
Coalition Labour	1		14,247	1.3	
Coalition NDP	0		12,337	1.1	
Labour	6		265,744	22.9	+19.3
Liberal	8		163,960	15.0	-36.6
Unionist	2		21,939	2.0	
Co-operative Party	0		19,841	1.8	
Highland Land League	0		8,710	0.8	
Scottish Prohibition Party	0		5,212	0.5	
NDP	0		4,297	0.4	
Other	1		52,749	4.7	
Total	71		1,126,711	100	

=== 1910 December ===
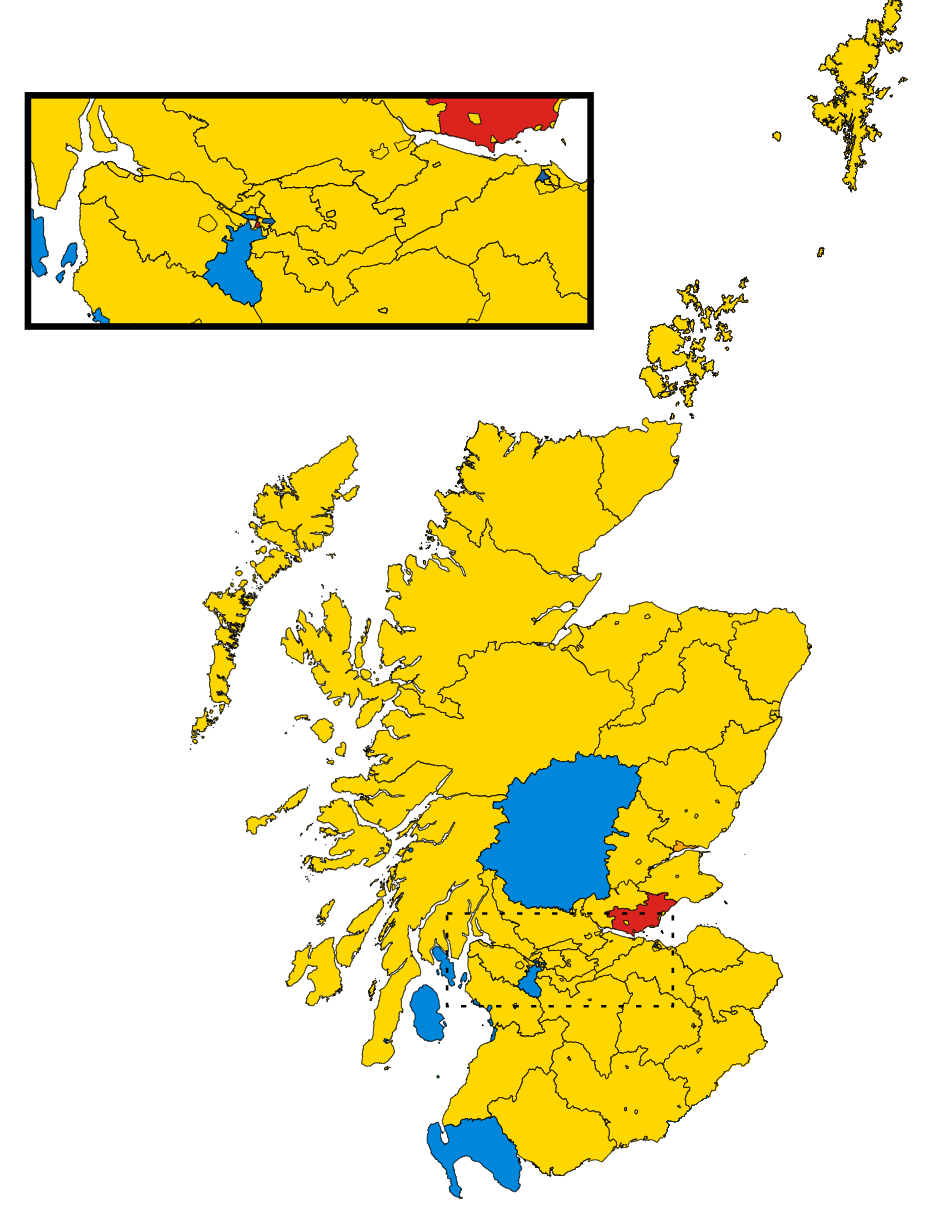
December 1910 Map

Party	Seats	Seats change	Votes	%	% Change
Liberal	57	▼1	306,378	53.6	▼0.6
Conservative and Liberal Unionist	10	▲1	244,785	42.6	▲3.0
Labour Party	3	▲1	24,633	3.6	▼1.5
Other	0	▼1	1,947	0.2	▼0.9
Total	70		577,743	100	

=== 1910 January ===
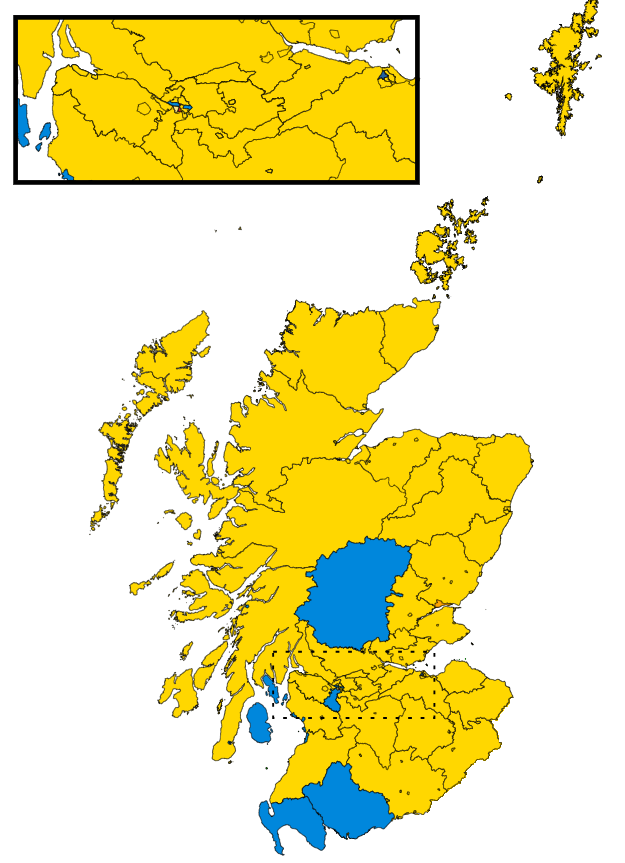
January 1910 Map

Party	Seats	Seats change	Votes	%	% Change
Liberal	58	Steady	354,847	54.2	▼2.2
Conservative and Liberal Unionist	9	▼1	260,033	39.6	▲1.4
Labour Party	2	Steady	37,852	5.1	▲2.8
Other	1	▲1	7,710	1.1	▼2.0
Total	70		660,442	100	

=== 1906 ===
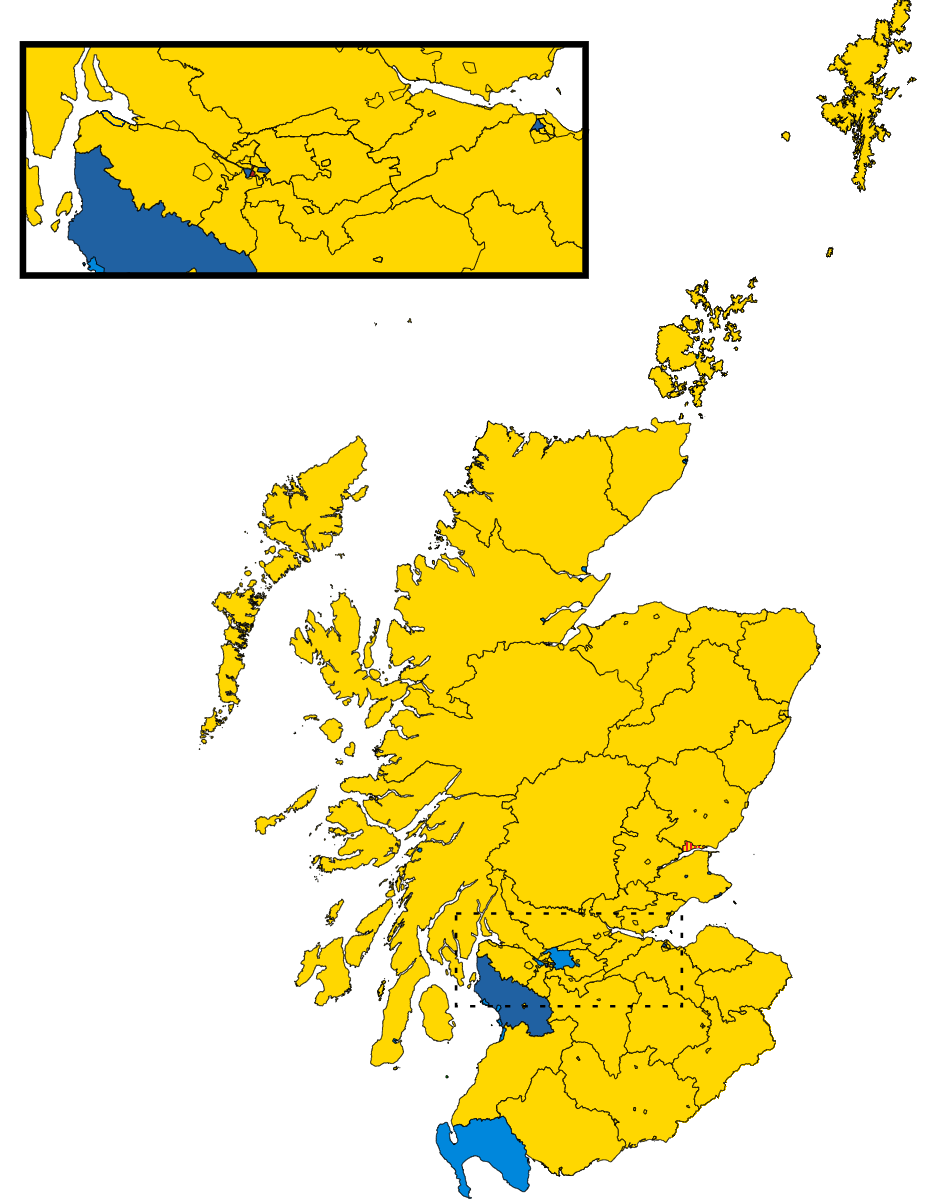
1906 Map

Party	Seats	Seats change	Votes	%	% Change
Liberal	58	▲24	336,400	56.4	▲6.2
Conservative and Liberal Unionist	10	▼26	225,802	38.2	▼10.8
Labour	2	▲2	16,897	2.3	
Other	0		17,815	3.1	
Total	70		596,914	100	

=== 1900 ===
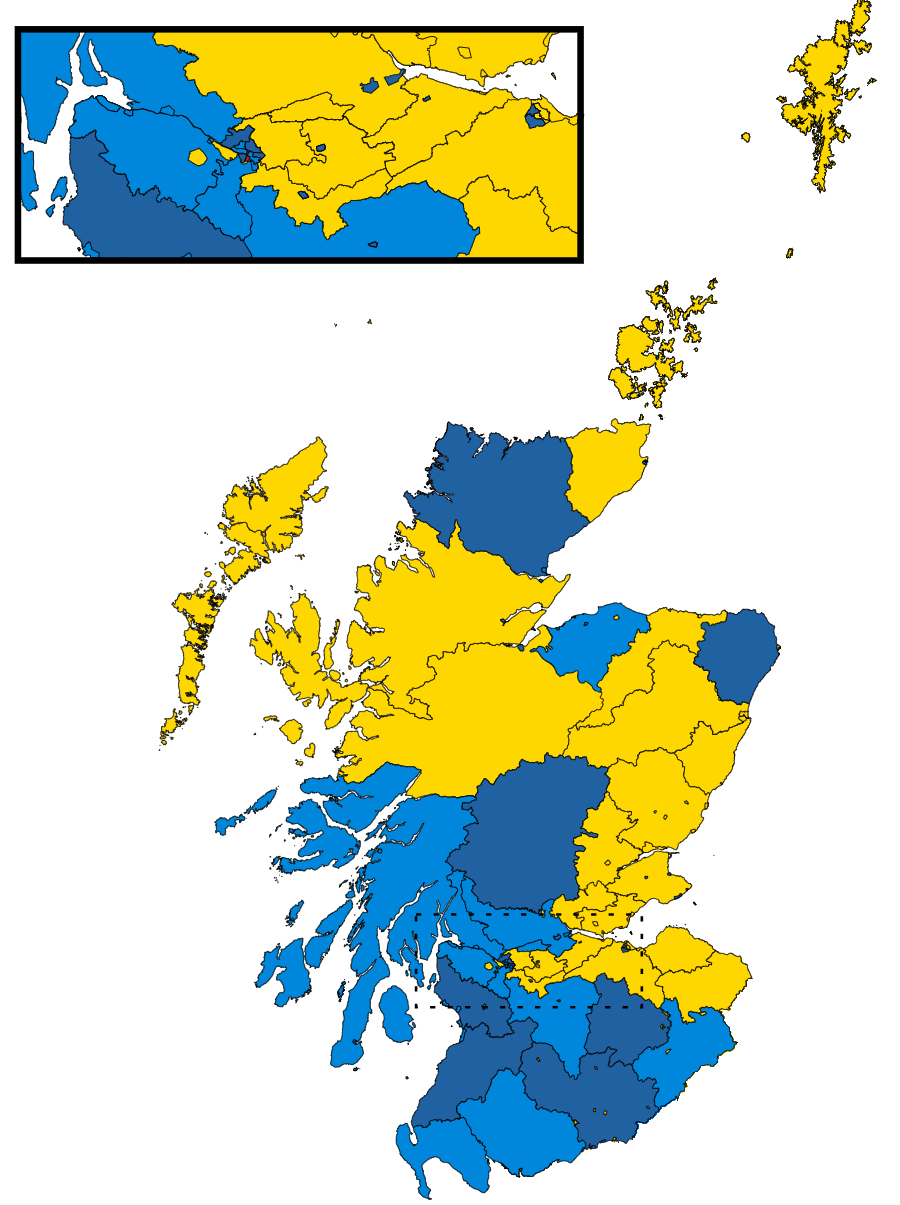
1900 Map

Party	Seats	Seats change	Votes	%	% Change
Conservative and Liberal Unionist	36	▲5	237,217	49.0	▲1.6
Liberal	34	▼5	245,092	50.2	▼1.5
Scottish Workers'	0	Steady	3,107	0.6	
Other	0	Steady	814	0.2	
Total	70		486,230	100	

=== 1895 ===
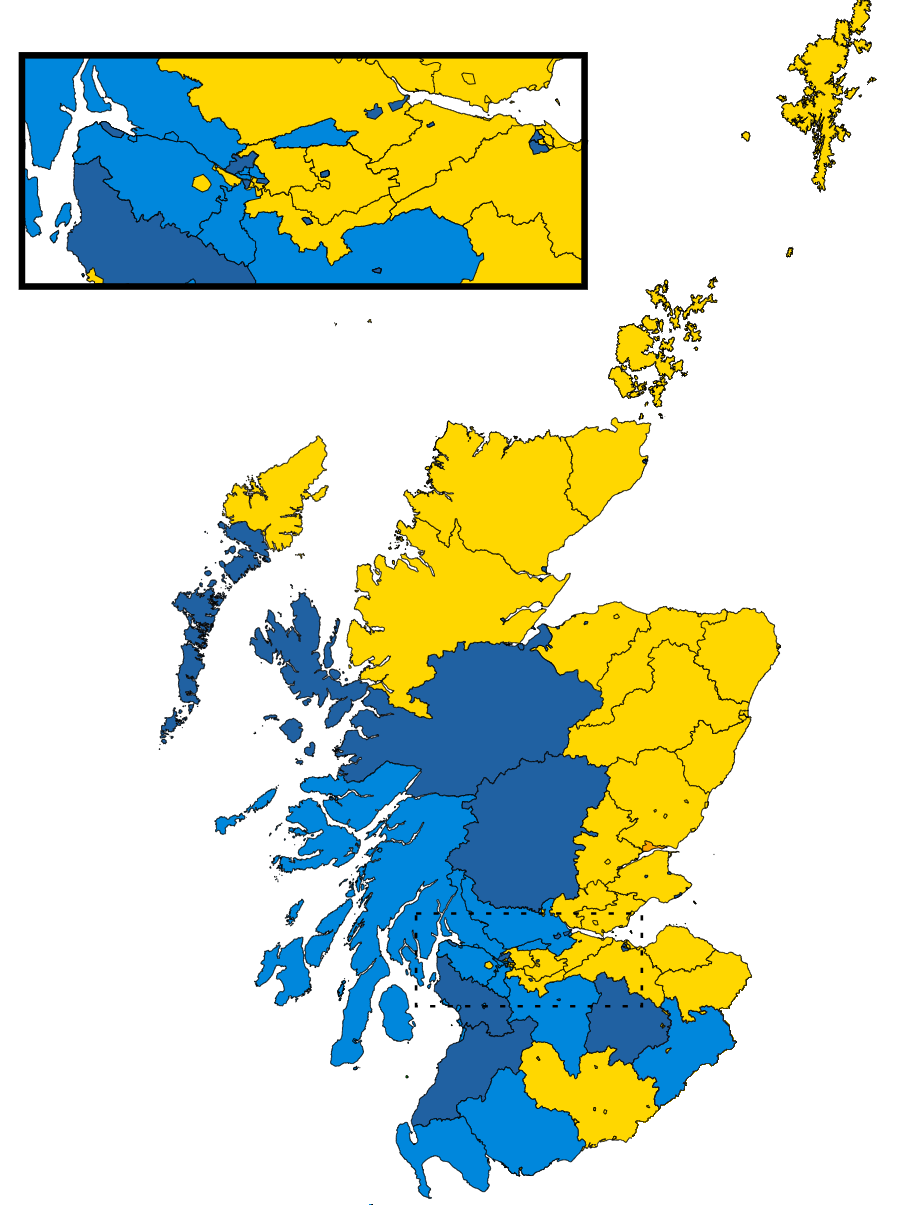
1895 Map

Party	Seats	Seats change	Votes	%	% Change
Liberal	39	▼12	236,446	51.7	▼2.2
Conservative & Liberal Unionist	31	▲12	214,403	47.4	▲3
Independent Labour Party	0	Steady	4,269	0.8	▲0.8
Total	70			100	

=== 1892 ===
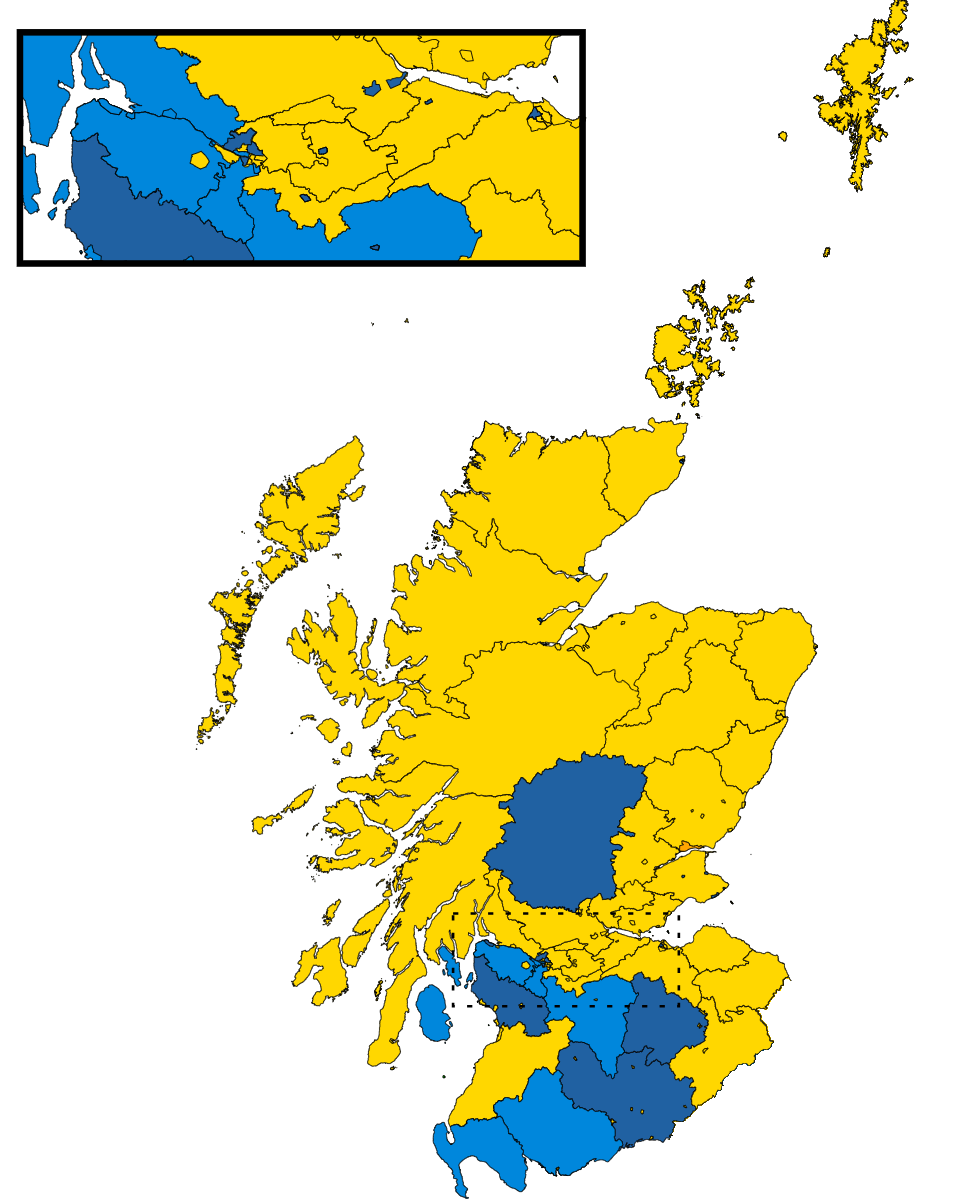
1892 Map

Party	Seats	Seats change	Votes	%	% Change
Liberal	51	▲8	256,944	53.9	▲0.3
Conservative & Liberal Unionist	19	▼8	209,944	44.4	▼2.0
Scottish Trades Councils Labour	0	Steady	2,313	0.5	▲0.5
Scottish Parliamentary Labour	0	Steady	2,043	0.4	▲0.4
Other	0	Steady	3,886	0.8	▲0.8
Total	70		475,130	100	

=== 1886 ===
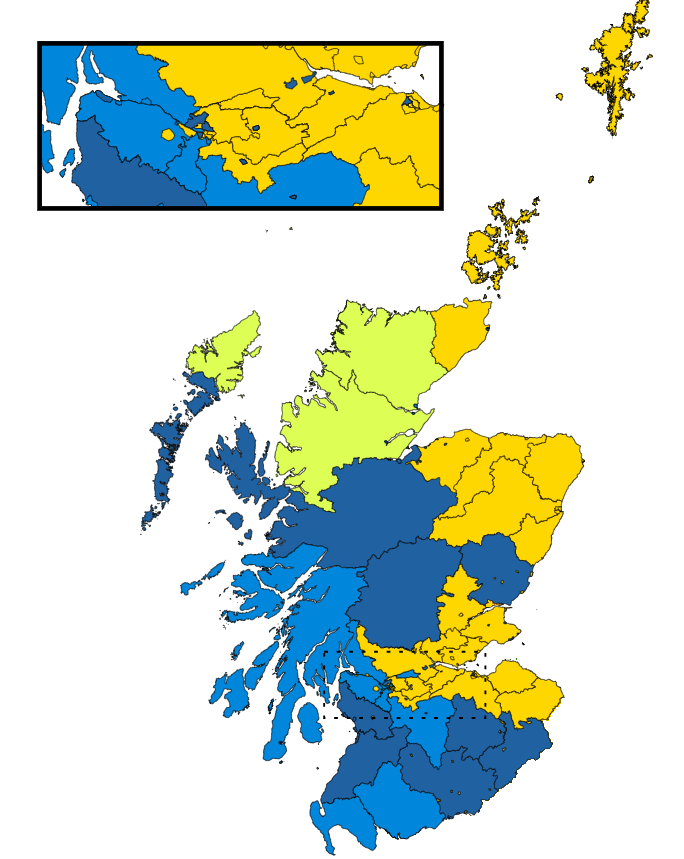
1886 Map

Party	Seats	Seats change	Votes	%	% Change
Liberal & Crofters Party	43	▼19	193,801	53.6	▲0.3
Conservative & Liberal Unionist	27	▲19	164,314	46.4	▲12.1
Total	70		358,115	100	

=== 1885 ===
1885 Map

Party	Seats	Seats change	Votes	%	% Change
Liberal	51	▼1	238,627	53.3	▼16.8
Conservative	8	▲2	151,137	34.3	▲4.4
Independent Liberal & Crofters Party	4	▲4	16,551	3.7	▲3.7
Independent Liberal	7	▲7	38,214	8.6	▲8.6
Others	0	Steady	38,214	8.6	▲8.6
Scottish Land Restoration League	0	Steady	2,359	0.5	▲0.5
Total	70	▲12	446,888	100	

=== 1880 ===
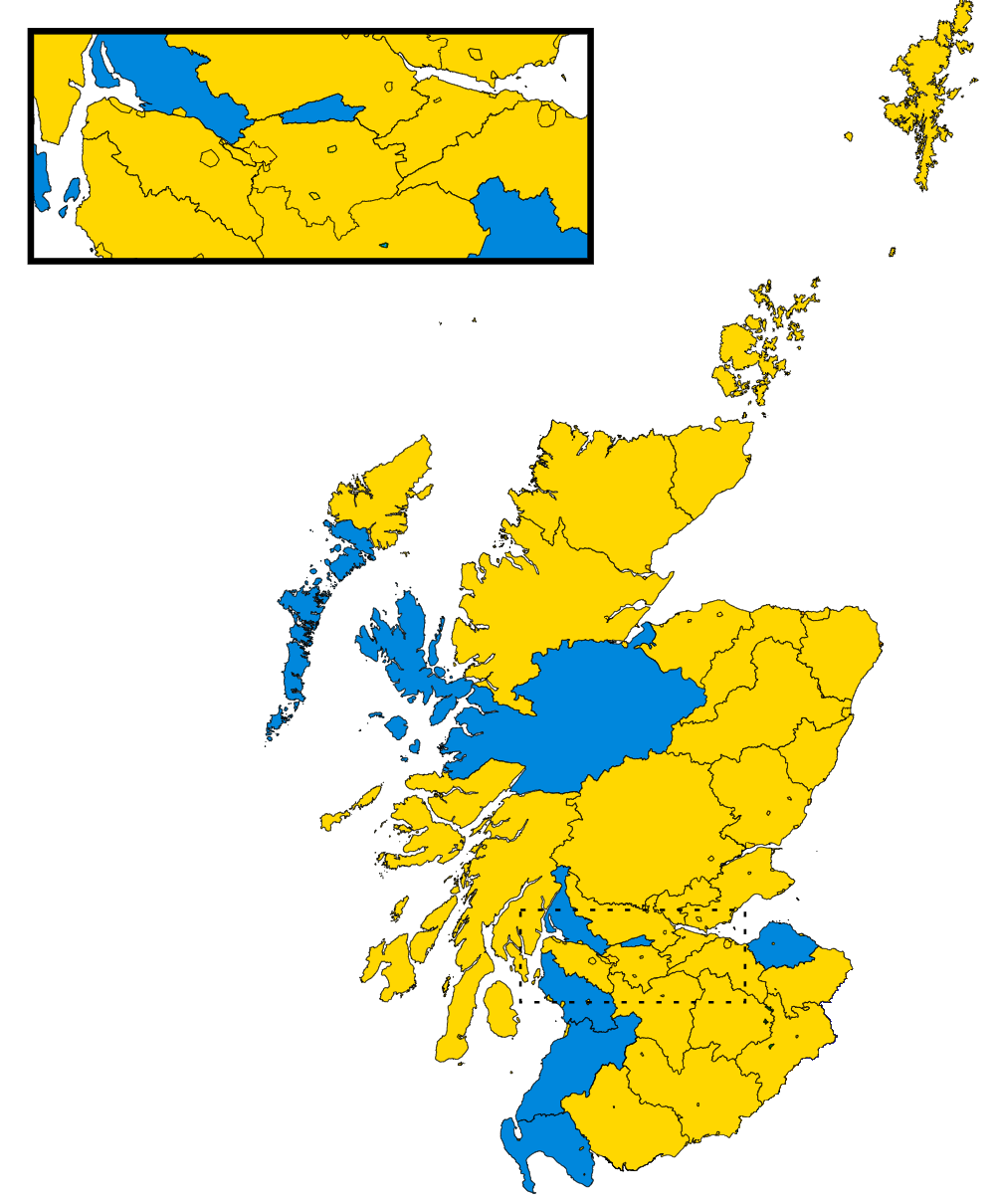
1880 Map

Party	Seats	Seats change	Votes	%	% Change
Liberal	52	▲12	195,517	70.1	▲1.7
Conservative	6	▼12	75,145	29.9	▼1.7
Total	58		269,662	100	

=== 1874 ===
Party	Seats	Seats change	Votes	%	% Change
Liberal	40	▼11	148,345	70.1	▼12.4
Conservative	18	▲11	63,193	29.9	▲12.4
Total	58		211,538	100	

=== 1868 ===
Party	Seats	Seats change	Votes	%	% Change
Liberal	51	▲9	125,356	82.5	▼2.9
Conservative	7	▼4	23,985	17.5	▲2.9
Total	58	▲5	149,341	100	

=== 1865 ===
Party	Seats	Seats change	Votes	%	% Change
Liberal	42	▲2	43,480	85.4	▲21.0
Conservative	11	▼2	4,305	14.6	▼19.0
Total	53		47,785	100	

=== 1859 ===
Party	Seats	Seats change	Votes	%	% Change
Liberal	40	▲1	5,174	66.4	▼18.4
Conservative & Liberal Unionist	13	▼1	2,616	33.6	▲18.4
Total	53		7,790	100	

=== 1857 ===
Party	Seats	Seats change	Votes	%	% Change
Liberal	39	▲6	31,999	84.8	▲12.2
Conservative & Liberal Unionist	14	▼6	4,060	15.2	▼12.2
Total	53		36,059	100	

=== 1852 ===
Party	Seats	Seats change	Votes	%	% Change
Whig	33	-	21,015	72.6	▼9.1
Conservative & Liberal Conservative	20	-	6,955	27.4	▲9.1
Total	53		27,970	100	

=== 1847 ===
Party	Seats	Seats change	Votes	%	% Change
Whig	33	-	20,092	81.7	▲19.9
Conservative & Liberal Conservative	20	-	3,509	18.3	▼20.0
Total	53		23,601	100	

=== 1841 ===
Party	Seats	Seats change	Votes	%	% Change
Whig	31	▼2	16,356	60.8	▲6.8
Conservative	22	▲2	9,793	38.3	▼8.3
Chartist	0		385	0.9	
Total	53		26,354	100	

=== 1837 ===
Party	Seats	Seats change	Votes	%	% Change
Whig	33	▼5	22,082	54.0	▼8.8
Conservative	20	▲5	18,569	46.0	▲8.8
Total	53	-	40,651	100	

=== 1835 ===
Party	Seats	Seats change	Votes	%	% Change
Whig	38	▼5	28,307	62.8	▼16.2
Conservative	15	▲5	15,733	37.2	▲16.2
Total	53		44,040	100	

=== 1832 ===
Party	Seats	Seats change	Votes	%	% Change
Whig	43	▲22	44,003	79.0	
Tory	10	▼13	9,752	21.0	
Total	53		53,755	100	

=== 1831 ===
Party	Seats	Seats change	Votes	%	% Change
Tory	23	▼10			
Whig	21	▲9			
Doubtful	1	▲1			
Total	45			100	

=== 1830 ===
Party	Seats	Seats change	Votes	%	% Change
Tory	33				
Whig	12				
Total	45			100	

== Local councils ==
Since 1995, local elections in Scotland have been generally held every four years for all the 32 unitary authorities created under the Local Government etc. (Scotland) Act 1994. Between 1975 and 1992, elections were held every two years for either district or regional council, which sat for four-year terms. Those arrangements were set up by the Local Government (Scotland) Act 1973.

As one consequence of the Gould Report, which was a response to the fiasco of the 2007 elections, the next council elections were scheduled for 2012 (one year after the Parliamentary elections in 2011).

=== 2017 ===
The elections were held again using the STV system of proportional representation, and as with the 2012 Scottish local elections, they were delayed for one year to ensure they were not held on the same day as the 2016 Scottish Parliament elections (which was delayed for a year, owing to the 2015 general election). For full analysis see 2017 Scottish local elections.

=== 2012 ===
The election was contested for the second time under the STV system of proportional representation. It was the first time in 13 years that the elections had not been held on the same day as the Scottish Parliament elections.

=== Past elections ===
- 1977 Scottish local elections
- 1980 Scottish local elections
- 1982 Scottish regional elections
- 1984 Scottish local elections
- 1986 Scottish regional elections
- 1988 Scottish local elections
- 1990 Scottish regional elections
- 1992 Scottish local elections
- 1994 Scottish regional elections
- 1995 Scottish local elections
- 1999 Scottish local elections
- 2003 Scottish local elections
- 2007 Scottish local elections

== By-elections ==
=== 2008 ===
- date to be announced: Abbey (4-member ward), Dumfries and Galloway, 1 member elected by single transferable vote: result pending (result May 2007: 2 Con, 1 SNP, 1 Lab)
- 1 May: Troup (3-member ward), Aberdeenshire, 1 member elected by single transferable vote: result pending (result May 2007: 1 SNP, 1 Con, 1 Ind)
- 6 March: Cambuslang East (3-member ward), South Lanarkshire, 1 member elected by single transferable vote: Lab gain from SNP (result May 2007: 2 Lab, 1 SNP; after by election: 3 Lab)
- 28 Feb: Lerwick South (4-member ward), Shetland, 1 member elected by single transferable vote: Ind hold (result May 2007: 4 Ind; after by election: 4 Ind)
- 21 Feb: Highland (3-member ward), Perth and Kinross, 1 member elected by single transferable vote: SNP hold (result May 2007: 2 SNP, 1 Con; after by election: 2 SNP, 1 Con)
- 14 Feb: Elgin City South (3-member ward), Moray, 1 member elected by single transferable vote: SNP gain from Ind (result May 2007: 1 SNP, 1 Lab, 1 Ind; after by election: 2 SNP, 1 Lab)
- 31 January: Kilsyth (3-member ward), North Lanarkshire, 1 member elected by single transferable vote: Lab hold (result May 2007: 2 Lab, 1 SNP; after by election: 2 Lab, 1 SNP)

=== 2007 ===
- 22 November: Lochee (4-member ward), Dundee, 1 member elected by single transferable vote: SNP hold (result May 2007: 2 SNP, 2 Lab; after by election: 2 SNP, 2 Lab)
- 4 October: Helensburgh and Lomond South (3-member ward), Argyll and Bute, 1 member elected by single transferable vote: Lib Dem gain from Ind (result May 2007: 1 Con, 1 Ind, 1 Lib Dem; after by election: 2 Lib Dem, 1 Con)
- 16 August: Midstocket/Rosemount (3-member ward), Aberdeen, 1 member elected by single transferable vote: SNP gain from Con (result May 2007: 1 Con, 1 SNP, 1 Lab; after by election: 2 SNP, 1 Lab)

=== 2006 ===
- 8 December: Elderslie, Renfrewshire, Lab hold (16% swing Lab to SNP)
- 28 September: Markinch and Woodside East, Fife, SNP gain from Lab
- 10 August: Lochardil, Highland, Lib Dem gain from Ind
- 15 June: Dumbarton West, West Dunbartonshire, SNP gain from Lab
- 18 May: Altonhill Hillhead and Longpark, East Ayrshire, SNP hold
- 11 May: Biggar, Symington and Black Mount, South Lanarkshire, Con gain from SNP
- 30 March: Avondale South, South Lanarkshire, Con hold
- 30 March: Borestone, Stirling, SNP gain from Lab
- 30 March: King's Park, Glasgow, Lib Dem gain from Lab
- 16 February: Milton, Glasgow, SNP gain from Lab
- 2 February: North Carrick and Maybole East, South Ayrshire, Ind gain from Lab

=== 2005 ===
- 8 December: Kirkshaws, North Lanarkshire, Lab hold
- 10 November: Knightswood Park, Glasgow, Lab hold
- 10 November: Loanhead, Midlothian, SNP gain from Ind
- 10 November: Murrayfield, Edinburgh, Con hold
- 13 October: Lochside, Dumfries and Galloway, Lab gain from Ind
- 29 September: Auchtertool and Burntisland East, Fife, SNP gain from Ind
- 11 August: Herbertshire, Falkirk, SNP gain from Lab
- 16 June: Kildrum and Park, North Lanarkshire, SNP gain from Ind
- 9 June: Huntly East, Aberdeenshire, Con hold
- 9 June: Kilnknowe and Clovenfords, Borders, SNP gain from Ind
- 17 March: Dalkeith/Woodburn, Midlothian, Lib Dem gain from Lab
- 17 March: Dumbarton West, West Dunbartonshire, Lab hold

== European Parliament ==
In 1999, a Scotland-wide constituency replaced eight first-past-the-post constituencies used in the elections between 1979 and 1994. This returned eight MEPs under the d'Hondt method of party-list proportional representation system. Since then the number of MEPs returned by Scotland has been reduced twice, to seven in 2004, and then to six in 2009.

Following the United Kingdom's exit from the European Union on 31 January 2020, Scotland no longer elects representatives to the European Parliament.

Elected candidates are shown in bold. Brackets indicate the number of votes per seat won.

=== 2019 ===
European Election 2019: Scotland
List	Candidates	Votes	Of total (%)	± from prev.
SNP	**Alyn Smith, Christian Allard, Aileen McLeod** Margaret Ferrier, Heather Anderson, Alex Kerr	594,553 (198,184.3)	37.8%	+8.8
Brexit Party	**Louis Stedman-Bryce** Karina Walker, James Ferguson-Hannah, Stuart Waiton, Paul Aitken, Calum Walker	233,006	14.8%	New
Liberal Democrats	**Sheila Ritchie** Fred Mackintosh, Catriona Bhatia, Vita Zaporozcenko, John Edward, Clive Sneddon	218,285	13.8%	+6.8
Conservative	**Nosheena Mobarik** Ian McGill, Shona Haslam, Iain Whyte, Andrea Gee, Michael Kusznir	182,476	11.6%	−5.6
Labour	David Martin, Jayne Baxter, Craig Miller, Amy Lee Fraioli, Callum O’Dwyer, Angela Bretherton	146,724	9.3%	−16.6
Green	Maggie Chapman, Lorna Slater, Gillian Mackay, Chas Booth, Mags Hall, Allan Faulds	129,603	8.2%	+0.1
Change UK – The Independent Group	David Macdonald,^{1} Kate Forman, Peter Griffiths, Heather Astbury, Colin McFadyen, Cathy Edgeworth	30,004	1.9%	New
UKIP	Donald MacKay, Janice MacKay, Otto Inglis, Mark Meechan, Roy Hill	28,418	1.8%	−8.7
Independent	Gordon Edgar	6,128	0.4%	N/A
Independent	Ken Parke	2,049	0.1%	N/A
Turnout		1,561,226	39.9%	+ 6.4

=== 2014 ===
European Parliament election 2014: Scotland
List	Candidates	Votes	Of total (%)	± from prev.
SNP	**Ian Hudghton**, **Alyn Smith**, Tasmina Ahmed-Sheikh, Stephen Gethins, Toni Giugliano, Chris Stephens	389,503 (194,751.5)	29.0	–0.1
Labour	**David Martin**, **Catherine Stihler**, Derek Munn, Katrina Murray, Asim Khan, Kirsty O'Brien	348,219 (174,109.5)	25.9	+5.1
Conservative	**Ian Duncan**, Belinda Don, Nosheena Mobarik, Jamie Gardiner, Iain McGill, Stuart McIntyre	231,330	16.8	+0.4
UKIP	**David Coburn**, Kevin Newton, Otto Inglis, Denise Baykal, Hugh Hatrick, Malcolm Mackay	140,534	10.5	+5.3
Green	Maggie Chapman, Chas Booth, Grace Murray, Alastair Whitelaw, Anne Thomas, Steen Parish	108,305	8.1	+0.8
Liberal Democrats	George Lyon, Christine Jardine, Richard Brodie, Jade Holden, Siobhan Mathers, Euan Davidson	95,319	7.1	–4.4
Britain First	James Dowson, John Arthur Randall, Jayda Fransen, Geoffrey Clynch, Margaret Clynch, Jane Shepherd	13,551	2.0	[new]
BNP	Kenneth McDonald, David Orr, Victoria McKenzie, Angus Matthys, Paul Stafford, Stacey Fleming	10,150	0.8	–1.7
NO2EU	John Foster. Andrew Elliott, Murdo Maclean, Gail Morrow, Brian Smith, Richard Veitch	6,388	0.5	–0.4
Turnout		1,343,299	33.5%	+5.0%

=== 2009 ===
European Parliament election 2009: Scotland
List	Candidates	Votes	Of total (%)	± from prev.
SNP	**Ian Hudghton**, **Alyn Smith** Aileen McLeod, Drew Hendry, Duncan Ross, Gordon Archer	321,007 (160,503.5)	29.1	+9.4
Labour	**David Martin**, **Catherine Stihler** Mary Lockhart, Paul McAleavely, Kirsty Connell, Nasim Khan	229,853 (114,926.5)	20.8	−5.6
Conservative	**Struan Stevenson** Belinda Don, Helen Gardiner, Donald G. MacDonald, Gerald Michaluk, PJ Lewis	185,794	16.8	−0.9
Liberal Democrats	**George Lyon** Euan Robson, Robert Aldridge, Patsy Kenton, Douglas Herbison, Clive Sneddon	127,038	11.5	−1.6
Green	Elaine Morrison, Chas Booth, Kirsten Robb, Alastair Whitelaw, Ruth Dawkins, Peter McColl	80,442	7.3	+0.5
UKIP	Peter Adams, Paul Hencke, Phillip Anderson, Matthew Desmond, Donald Mackay, Paul Wiffen, Kathleen Desmond	57,788	5.2	−1.5
BNP	Gary Raikes, Charlie Baillie, Deborah McKnight, Roy Jones, Max Dunbar, Elise Jones	27,174	2.5	+0.8
Socialist Labour	Louise McDaid, David Jacobsen, Katherine McGavigan, James Berrington, Claire Watt, James McDaid	22,135	2.0	+2.0
Scottish Christian	Sheila McLaughlan, John Smart, Brian Ross, Archie Linnegan, Christine Cormack, Isobel Anne Macleod	16,738	1.5	+1.5
Scottish Socialist	Colin Fox, Angela Gorrie, Johanna Dind, Nick McKerrell, Raphie de Santos, Felicity Garvie	10,404	0.9	−4.3
Independent	Duncan Robertson	10,189	0.9	+0.9
NO2EU	John Foster, Tommy Sheridan, Leah Ganley, Stuart Hyslop, Ajit Singh Uppal, Tom Morrison	9,693	0.9	+0.9
Jury Team	Alan Wallace, John O'Callaghan, Stuart Brown, Kenneth Lees, Mev Brown, Austin Compson-Bradford	6,257	0.6	+0.6
Turnout		1,104,512	28.5	−2.4

=== 2004 ===
European Parliament election 2004: Scotland
List	Candidates	Votes	Of total (%)	± from prev.
Labour	**David Martin**, **Catherine Stihler** Bill Miller, Kirsty O'Brien, Colin Smyth, Catriona Renton, Gemma Doyle	310,865 (155,432.5)	26.4	−2.3
SNP	**Ian Hudghton**, **Alyn Smith** Kenneth Gibson, Douglas Henderson, Alexander Nicholson, Alex Orr, Janet Law, Duncan Ross	231,505 (115,752.5)	19.7	−7.5
Conservative	**Struan Stevenson**, **John Purvis** Cameron Buchanan, Sebastian Leslie, Anne Harper, Paul Nelson, Douglas Taylor	209,028 (104,514)	17.8	−2.0
Liberal Democrats	**Elspeth Attwooll** Robert Aldridge, Alex Bruce, Karen Freel, Douglas Herbison, Clive Sneddon, Christine James, Jermaine Allison	154,178	13.1	+3.3
Green	Chas Booth, Tara O'Leary, Martin Bartos, Moira Dunworth, Alastair Whitelaw, Katherine Joester, James Park	79,695	6.8	+1.0
UKIP	Peter Troy, Philip Anderson, George Cormack, Michael Phillips, Janice Murdock, Donald Mackay, Peter Nielson	78,828	6.7	+5.4
Scottish Socialist	Felicity Garvie, Nick McKerrel, Hugh Kerr, Catriona Grant, Lynn Sheridan, John Sangster, Andrew Rossiter	61,356	5.2	+1.2
Christian Vote	George Hargreaves, William Thompson, Richard Russell, David Braid, Marion McNeill, Mary Hay, Rose Irtwange	21,056	1.8	N/A
BNP	Steven Blake, Scott McLean, David Kerr, Stephen Burns, Bryan Dickson, Craig McComb, John Bean	19,427	1.7	+1.3
Scottish Wind Watch	Brendan Hamill, Sylvia Thorne, Charles Bennie, Jennifer Scobie, Bennie Palmer, Helen Pass, Richard Hammock	7,255	0.6	N/A
Independent	Fergus Tait	3,624	0.3	N/A
Turnout		1,176,817	30.9	+6.2

=== 1999 ===
European Parliament election 1999: Scotland
List	Candidates	Votes	Of total (%)	± from prev.
Labour	**David Martin**, **Bill Miller**, **Catherine Taylor** Christine May, Hugh McMahon, James Paton, John Clifford, Jeanette Bradley	283,490 (94,496.67)	28.7	N/A
SNP	**Ian Hudghton**, **Neil MacCormick** Anne Gillies, Gordon Wilson, Janet Law, Kris Browne, Ian Goldie, Josephine Docherty	268,528 (134,264)	27.2	N/A
Conservative	**Struan Stevenson**, **John Purvis** Anne Harper, Cameron Buchanan, Sebastian Leslie, Iain Mitchell, Peter Ramsay, Anthony Gilbey	195,296 (97,648)	19.8	N/A
Liberal Democrats	**Elspeth Attwooll** Robert Aldridge, Neil Mitchison, Heather Lyall, Clive Sneddon, Danus Skene, Karen Freel, Jayne Struthers	96,971	9.8	N/A
Green	Marion Coyne, Eleanor Scott, Phil O'Brien, Graeme Farmer, Linda Hendry, Chris Ballance, Kay Allan, Alastair Whitelaw	57,142	5.8	N/A
Scottish Socialist	Hugh Kerr, Rosie Kane, Harvey Duke, Catherine Stewart, Colin Fox, Shareen Blackall, Steve Arnott, Frances Curran	39,720	4.0	N/A
Pro-Euro Conservative	Paul Dwyer, Joanna Lavender, Douglas McConchie, Richard Ashurst, Neasa MacEarlean, Oliver Grant, Alexander Skinner, James Waters	17,781	1.8	N/A
UKIP	Alistair McConnachie, Donald Mackay, James McKenna, Stuart Brown, Matthew Henderson, Joseph Smith, Peter Nielson, John Mumford	12,459	1.3	N/A
Socialist Labour	Louise McDaid, Christopher Herriot, Katharine McGavigan, Stephen Mayes, Patricia Graham, Colin Turbett, Margaret Stead, James Galloway	9,385	1.0	N/A
BNP	Kenneth Smith, Scott McLean, Russell Bradley, Mark Allen, Paul Wilkinson, Robert Currie, David Kerr, James Mills	3,729	0.4	N/A
Natural Law	James McKissock, George Stidolph, Diana Kras, Kenneth Blair, David Pettigrew, Iain Petrie, Anna Rawlinson, Thomas Pringle	2,087	0.2	N/A
Accountant for Lower Scottish Taxes	Charles Lawson	1,632	0.2	N/A
Turnout		988,310	24.7	N/A

=== Pre-1999 elections ===
For full details of results please referee to related articles;

- Glasgow
- Highlands and Islands
- Lothians
- Mid Scotland and Fife
- North East Scotland
- South of Scotland
- Strathclyde East
- Strathclyde West

=== 1994 ===
Party	Seats	Seats change	Votes	%	% change
Labour	6	-1	635,955	42.51	+0.65
SNP	2	+1	487,239	32.57	+6.94
Conservative	0	Steady	216,669	14.48	–6.41
Liberal Democrats	0	Steady	107,811	7.21	+2.92
Green	0	Steady	23,304	1.56	–5.69
Scottish Militant Labour	0	–	12,113	0.81	–
Natural Law	0	–	5,037	0.34	–
Liberal	0	–	3,249	0.22	–
Socialist (GB)	0	–	1,832	0.12	–
UKIP	0	–	1,096	0.07	–
Communist	0	Steady	689	0.05	–0.02
Independent	0	–	584	0.04	–
International Communist	0	Steady	381	0.03	+0.02
Turnout:			**1,495,959**		

=== 1989 ===
Party	Seats	Seats change	Votes	%	% change
Labour	7	+2	664,263	41.86	+0.87
SNP	1	Steady	406,686	25.63	+7.81
Conservative	0	–2	331,495	20.89	–4.83
Green	0	Steady	115,028	7.25	+7.05
SLD	0	Steady	68,056	4.29	–11.31
Communist	0	–	1,164	0.07	–
International Communist	0	–	193	0.01	–
Turnout:			**1,586,885**		

=== 1984 ===
Party	Seats	Seats change	Votes	%	% change
Labour	5	+3	526,066	40.99	+8.00
Conservative	2	–3	332,771	25.72	–7.96
SNP	1	Steady	230,594	17.82	–1.56
Alliance	0	Steady	201,782	15.60	–1.65
Ecology	0	–	2,560	0.20	–
Turnout:			**1,293,773**		

=== 1979 ===
Party	Seats	Seats change	Votes	%	% change
Conservative	5	–	430,772	33.68	–
Labour	2	–	421,968	32.99	–
SNP	1	–	247,836	19.38	–
Liberal	0	–	178,433	13.95	–
Turnout:			**1,279,009**		

== Referendums ==
To date eight referendums have been held in Scotland, covering a wide range of issues.

- 1975 United Kingdom European Communities membership referendum
- 1979 Scottish devolution referendum
- 1994 Strathclyde water referendum
- 1997 Scottish devolution referendum
- 2005 Edinburgh congestion charge referendum
- 2011 United Kingdom Alternative Vote referendum
- 2014 Scottish independence referendum
- 2016 United Kingdom European Union membership referendum

== See also ==
- Politics of Scotland
- Electoral systems in Scotland
- Political parties in Scotland
