= Glaswegian =

Glaswegian is the associated adjective and demonym of Glasgow, a city of the Scottish Lowlands in Scotland. It may refer to:

- Anything from or related to the city of Glasgow, in particular:
  - The people of Glasgow (see also List of people from Glasgow)
  - The Glasgow dialect of English and Scots

== See also ==
- Glasgow (disambiguation)
