= Glasgow (disambiguation) =

Glasgow is the largest city in Scotland.

Glasgow may also refer to:

- Glasgow (surname), including a list of people with the name
- Greater Glasgow Metropolitan Area
- Port Glasgow
- Glasgow (European Parliament constituency), 1979–1984
- Glasgow (Parliament of Scotland constituency), a pre-1707 constituency
- Glasgow (Scottish Parliament electoral region), an electoral region in the Scottish Parliament
- University of Glasgow
- Glasgow Airport
- Glasgow Prestwick Airport

== Places ==
=== Canada ===
- Glasgow, Ontario, a community located in the Regional Municipality of Durham
- Glasgow, a community in Caledon, Ontario

=== New Zealand ===
- Glasgow Range, a mountain range on the South Island

=== Suriname ===
- Glasgow, Suriname, in Nickerie District

=== United States ===
- Glasgow, Alabama, a place in Alabama
- Glasgow, California, a place in California
- Glasgo, Connecticut
- Glasgow, Delaware
- Glasgow, Georgia
- Glasgow, Illinois
- Glasgow, Kentucky
- Glasgow Township, Wabasha County, Minnesota
- Glasgow, Missouri
- Glasgow Village, Missouri
- Glasgow, Montana
- Glasgow, Columbiana County, Ohio
- Glasgow, Tuscarawas County, Ohio
- Glasgow, Oregon
- Glasgow, Pennsylvania
- Glasgow, Virginia
- Glasgow, West Virginia

== Sports ==
- Celtic F.C., professional football team (sometimes referred to as Glasgow Celtic in an international context, although the city is not in the club name)
- Glasgow City F.C., semi-professional women's football team
- Glasgow Clan, ice hockey team
- Glasgow Gladiators, powerchair football team
- Glasgow Hawks RFC, amateur rugby team
- Glasgow Rocks, basketball team
- Glasgow Tigers (American football)
- Glasgow Tigers (speedway)
- Glasgow Warriors, professional rugby team
- Rangers F.C., professional football team (sometimes referred to as Glasgow Rangers in an international context, although the city is not in the club name)

== Transportation ==
- Glasgow Prestwick Airport, official name of the airport in Ayrshire
- Glasgow station (disambiguation), several railway stations of the name
- Glasgow Subway, underground metro system in the Scottish city
- HMS Glasgow, a name given to eight Royal Navy warships
- HHS Glasgow, a royal yacht of Zanzibar
- SS City of Glasgow, a passenger steamship launched in 1850

== Other uses ==
- "Glasgow", a song by They Might Be Giants on the Venue Songs album
- 5805 Glasgow, a minor planet
- Glasgow (Cambridge, Maryland), a historic house
- Glasgow Bailie, a type of salted herring (which is also some times known as a Glasgow Magistrate)
- Glasgow effect, a term used to refer to poor health conditions in the Scottish city
- Glasgow Haskell Compiler, a compiler for the functional programming language Haskell
- Glasgow School, a circle of painters in the 1880s and 1890s
- Glasgow Coma Scale, medical scale describing the degree of consciousness of brain-damaged patients
- Glasgow Outcome Scale, a scale for patients with brain injuries
- Glasgow dialect, the local dialect in the Scottish city
- Glasgow smile, a facial scar
- Glasgow, a type of Knightmare Frame in the manga/anime series Code Geass

== See also ==
- Battle of Glasgow, Missouri
- Park City, Kentucky, formerly known as Glasgow Junction
- New Glasgow (disambiguation)
- Glasco (disambiguation)
