= Glasgow City =

Glasgow City or City of Glasgow may refer to:

- Glasgow City (council area), a unitary district established in 1996
  - Glasgow City Council, the local authority body in the city
- Glasgow, a city in Scotland
- City of Glasgow (1975–1996), a district of Strathclyde from 1975 to 1996
- Glasgow city centre, its main business district
- Glasgow City Region, a functional region centred around the city
- Glasgow City F.C., a professional women's football club
- Glasgow City B.C., a Scottish basketball club
- Greater Glasgow, the term for the larger urban area around the city
- SS City of Glasgow, a steamship that disappeared in 1854

== See also ==
- Glasgow (disambiguation)
