= Glasco =

Glasco may refer to:

- Glasco (surname)
- Glasco, Kansas, a city in Cloud County, Kansas, US
- Glasco, New York, a hamlet in Ulster County, New York, US

== See also ==
- Glasgow (disambiguation)
