= Craigholme School =

Closed Private day school in Pollokshields, Glasgow, Scotland

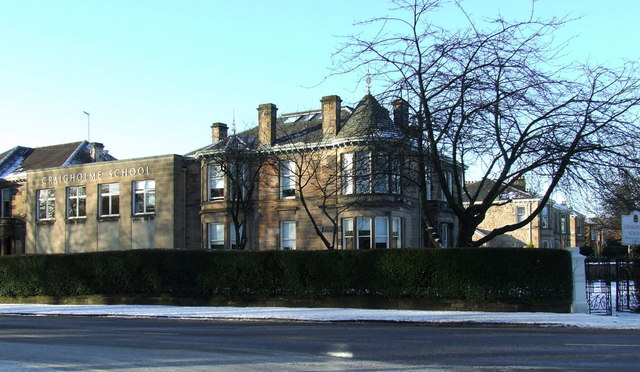

Location
- 72 St Andrew's Drive; Pollokshields; Glasgow, G41 4HS; Scotland; 55.840556°N 4.290833°W

Information
- Type: Private day school
- Motto: Persta atque Obdura (Be steadfast and endure)
- Religious affiliation: Non-denominational
- Established: 1894
- Founder: Mrs Jessie Murdoch
- Closed: 2020
- Local authority: Glasgow City Council
- Senior Teacher: Mrs Laura Neill
- Staff: 9
- Gender: Single-sex (female)
- Age: 3 to 18
- Enrolment: 40
- Houses: Tantallon, Culzean, Dunvegan, Galmis, and Huntly
- Colours: Red and white
- Website: Used to be http://www.craigholme.co.uk/ However, the website now redirects users to https://www.kelvinside.org/

Craigholme School was a private school for girls situated in the Pollokshields area of the South Side of Glasgow, Scotland. It was founded in 1894 and closed in 2020.

== History ==
The school was founded in 1894 by Mrs Jessie Murdoch as Pollokshields Ladies' School. The school had forty pupils on the roll and was housed at 63 Dalziel Drive in a villa named Craigholme. The school initially accepted boys up to the age of nine and girls up to the age of fourteen. The school's name was changed after the First World War to Craigholme School.

In 1937, the senior pupils moved to a house at 72 St Andrew's Drive on the corner with Hamilton Avenue, part of what is now the main site of the school, while the junior school remained at Dalziel Drive. The school was evacuated to the Trossachs from 1939–1940, and in 1942, headmistress Margaret Logie retired, selling the school to Pollok School Company, which had been established by parents and businessmen to preserve the school. The house at 328 Albert Drive was added to the school in 1942, and at 68 St Andrew's Drive in 1955. The school expanded further in 1963 with the purchase of numbers 2 and 4 Hamilton Avenue, which stood adjacent to 72 St Andrew's Drive. Three new laboratories and a hall were built in 1971, with a further storey on the science facilities in 1987.

St Ronan's Preparatory School at 204 Nithsdale Road was purchased in 1993 with the proceeds from the sale of 328 Albert Drive. The building housed Craigholme's nursery to J3 pupils until a dedicated nursery site was acquired at 62 St Andrew's Drive. Expansion in 2006 included a £2 million Sports Complex on the school's playing fields at Pollok Park which can be hired by external users (for example, the complex has become the 'home' of Glasgow Gladiators Powerchair FC).

In 2018, it was announced that Craigholme would join the 'Glasgow Schools Trust' with Kelvinside Academy. However, as pupil enrolment still decreased, it was decided in February 2019 to shut Craigholme Senior School in August 2019 and transfer pupils to Kelvinside, with Craigholme Junior School and the Nursery staying unaffected. In 2020, the Nursery and Primary School also closed for good. The buildings were sold in October 2020 for around £2.5 million, with plans for a residential development involving the destruction of the newer parts of the site submitted to the local authority two years later.
