= Glasgow station =

Glasgow station may refer to:

- Glasgow station (Montana), an Amtrak station in Glasgow, Montana, USA
- Glasgow Station, Ontario, former name of McNab/Braeside, Ontario, Canada
- Glasgow Central railway station, a railway station in Glasgow, Scotland
- Glasgow Queen Street railway station, the other railway terminus in the Scottish city
- Port Glasgow railway station, serving the town of Port Glasgow, Scotland.
- Glasgow Green railway station, (closed)
- Glasgow Cross railway station, (closed)

== See also ==
- Glasgow (disambiguation)
