= Janey Buchan =

Scottish politician (1926–2012)

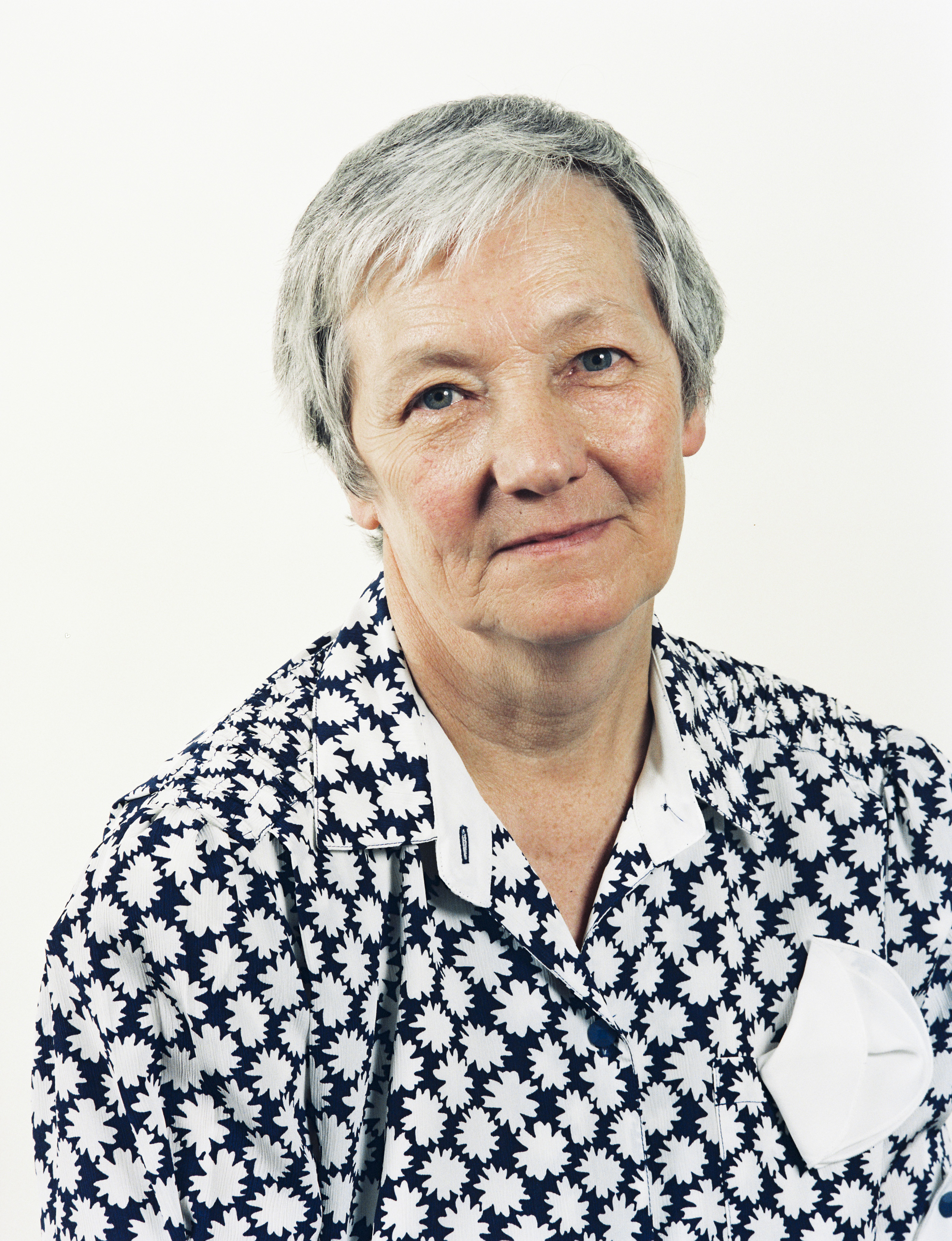
- Official portrait, 1989

Member of the European Parliament for Glasgow
- In office 1979–1994
- Preceded by: Constituency established
- Succeeded by: Bill Miller

Personal details
- Born: Jane O'Neil Kent; 30 April 1926 Glasgow, Scotland
- Died: 14 January 2012 (aged 85) Brighton, England
- Party: Labour
- Other political affiliations: Communist Party of Great Britain (until 1956)
- Spouse: Norman Buchan (m. 1946; died 1990)

Janey O'Neil Buchan (née Kent; 30 April 1926 – 14 January 2012) was a Scottish Labour politician who was a Member of the European Parliament (MEP) for the Glasgow constituency from 1979 to 1994.

== Early life ==
Jane Kent was born in Glasgow, a city where her father Joseph was a tram driver, and her mother Chrissie Sinclair was a domestic servant. She left school at the age of 14, and worked as a typist. Both parents were members of the Communist Party, and she was a member of the Young Communist League in her early life; she left the Communist Party after the Hungarian Revolution of 1956 was crushed by the Soviet Union.

She attended commercial college and was a councillor on Strathclyde Regional Council from 1974 to 1979, when she was elected to the European Parliament in 1979 for the first time. As an MEP she sat on the European Parliament's Culture Committee as well as being involved in the Scottish Arts Council and Scottish Gas Consumers Council. She was Life President of the Scottish Minorities Group (later Scottish Homosexual Rights Group and subsequently Outright Scotland).

Her lifetime of activity encompassed many fields. She was an early and active campaigner against apartheid and for nuclear disarmament. She was a supporter of Scottish traditional music and arts, and booked Pete Seeger for his first concert abroad after his passport was reissued in 1961. She helped run the People's Festival in 1949–52 during the Edinburgh Festival; the events she worked on helped create the Edinburgh Festival Fringe. As a Glasgow city councillor, she organised the first charity Christmas card sales in the UK. As a member of the council's arts committee, she was instrumental in providing funding for the first films made by Bill Forsyth, who went on to direct major UK and Hollywood films including Local Hero.

== Personal life ==
In 1946, at the age of 19 Jane Kent married Norman Buchan, a schoolteacher who later became Labour MP from 1964 for West Renfrewshire, and later Paisley South. He died in 1990. Janey Buchan died at a nursing home in Brighton, East Sussex, in 2012, aged 85 years. She was survived by her brother, Enoch Kent, her son Alasdair (a journalist), four grandchildren and three great-grandsons.

The papers of Norman and Janey Buchan were donated to Glasgow Caledonian University. In 2023 The Janey Buchan Political Song Collection was moved to the National Library of Scotland. Her parliamentary papers are also archived. In 2019, she was one of the candidates for "Greatest Glaswegian" in the Glasgow Times.
