= Glasco (surname) =

Glasco is an English and Welsh habitational surname, a variant of Glascock. It may refer to the following notable people:

- Gerry Glasco (born 1958), American college softball coach
- Joseph Glasco (1925–1996), American painter
- Kimberly Glasco (born 1960), Canadian ballerina
