= Glasgow Gladiators Powerchair FC =

Glasgow Gladiators
- Full name: Glasgow Gladiators Powerchair Football Club
- Short name: GGPFC
- Founded: 24 May 2016; 9 years ago
- Ground: Craigholme Sports Complex
- Chairman: Peter McGuire
- Head coach: Brian Quinn
- League: MDUK Scottish Powerchair League
- Website: http://www.glasgowgladiators.com/
Home colours

Glasgow Gladiators Powerchair Football Club is a Scottish powerchair football club based in Glasgow, Scotland. It was formed on 24 May 2016, and currently competes in the MDUK Scottish Powerchair League. The club consists of two teams: Glasgow Gladiators PFC and Glasgow Gladiator Bravehearts.

== History ==
The team started out as Glasgow City Powerchair, but evolved into the Clyde Powerchair Football Club (PFC)—the country's first powerchair football club—in September 2012 after receiving funding from Glasgow Sport. The team trained at the Craigholme Sports Complex and facilities in Cumbernauld, and entered five teams into the inaugural season of the Scottish Powerchair Football League.

For the 2015–16 season, Clyde PFC was split into two teams with the Cumbernauld teams continuing as Clyde PFC and the Craigholme teams coming under the control of Queen's Park F.C. After some initial success, the Queen's Park team found it difficult to compete with the other clubs in the league due to a lack of funding. The players, therefore, unanimously voted to break from Queen's Park and establish a new club that would be recognized by funding bodies.

On 24 May 2016, the new club was formally established. To determine the club's name, a players-poll was conducted via Facebook, and 'Glasgow Gladiators' was selected by a 10–2 vote over four other proposals. Later that summer, the club badge was designed by two members of the club's committee; it incorporates elements found in various logos used by other disabled sports and football clubs, as well as two stars added to honor two deceased former club members.

In June 2017, the club received a £10,000 grant from the Big Lottery Fund for the purchase of new equipment including a communal specialised electric wheelchair, which would assist in introducing new players to the sport (a personal chair costs £5000), and to support the costs of its operations, as well as offering the bowling-based wheelchair sport Boccia.

An early day motion, primarily sponsored by Scottish MP Stewart McDonald, congratulating the club for receiving the grant and commending its members for their efforts was tabled by the British Parliament on 28 June 2017.

Further funds have been raised by players via participation in events such as fun runs, and as the club became more widely known, supporters of Rangers F.C. showed an interest in offering financial assistance due to Gladiators players being fans of the club.

Glasgow Gladiators were one of 5 finalists in The People's Projects 2018 STV West region. They successfully amassed enough votes to become one of three winners in the region and won funding of £46,596 to expand their powerchair football and boccia clubs.

== Club committee ==
The club is run by the players themselves, supported by parents and caregivers. A committee was established to manage the daily affairs of the club for the players.

| Chairman | Peter McGuire |
| Vice-chairman | Idrees Ahmed |
| Secretary | Brian Quinn |
| Treasurer | Kenny Munro |

== Players ==
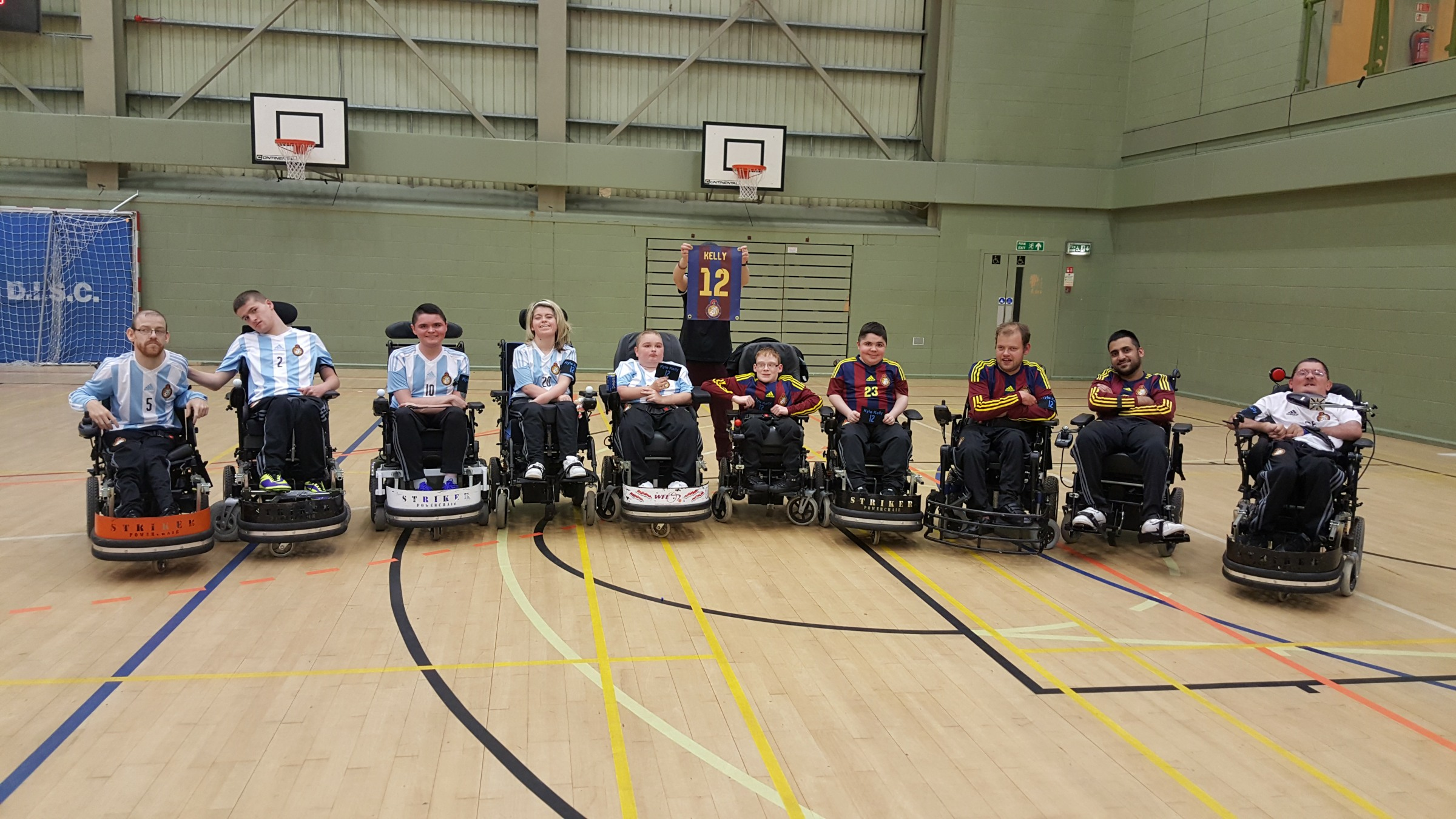
The Glasgow Gladiators teams for the 2016 Scottish League Cup wearing their home and away kits.

As of November 2017, the club has thirteen members and divided into two teams: Glasgow Gladiators PFC (seven players) and Glasgow Gladiator Bravehearts (six players). The players have disabilities such as Cerebral Palsy, Duchenne muscular dystrophy, Spina Bifida and Hydrocephalus.

=== Glasgow Gladiators Powerchair FC ===
Note: Flags indicate national team as defined under FIFA eligibility rules; some limited exceptions apply. Players may hold more than one non-FIFA nationality.

| No. | Pos. | Nation | Player |
|---|---|---|---|
| 1 | NA | | Daniel Quinn |
| 5 | na | | Gerry Jamieson |
| 7 | NA | | Josh Millar |
| 9 | NA | | Idrees Ahmed |
| 10 | NA | | Connor Colhoun |
| 23 | | | Ross Munro |
| 24 | | | Eddie Kirkwood |

- Head coach: Ruaridh Macinnes
- Assistant coaches: Brian Quinn & Andrew Nixon

=== Glasgow Gladiator Bravehearts ===
Note: Flags indicate national team as defined under FIFA eligibility rules; some limited exceptions apply. Players may hold more than one non-FIFA nationality.

| No. | Pos. | Nation | Player |
|---|---|---|---|
| 2 | NA | | Steven Sweeney |
| 4 | na | | Chris Elliott |
| 8 | na | | Christopher Chetty |
| 11 | NA | | Reegan Stevenson |
| 18 | NA | | Veronica Mitchell |
| 20 | NA | | Zoe McLauchlan |
| 67 | NA | | Peter McGuire |
| 88 | NA | | Alexander Tavendale |

- Head coach: Danny Millar
- Assistant coach: Gill Kilcullen
