= New Glasgow (disambiguation) =

New Glasgow is a city in Nova Scotia, Canada

New Glasgow may also refer to:

== Places ==
- New Glasgow, Prince Edward Island, Canada
- New Glasgow, Quebec, a former village that merged into Sainte-Sophie, Quebec in 2000
- New Glasgow, Virginia, renamed Clifford, Virginia

== Other uses ==
- HMCS New Glasgow, a River class frigate
