= Bill Miller (Scottish politician) =

Scottish politician

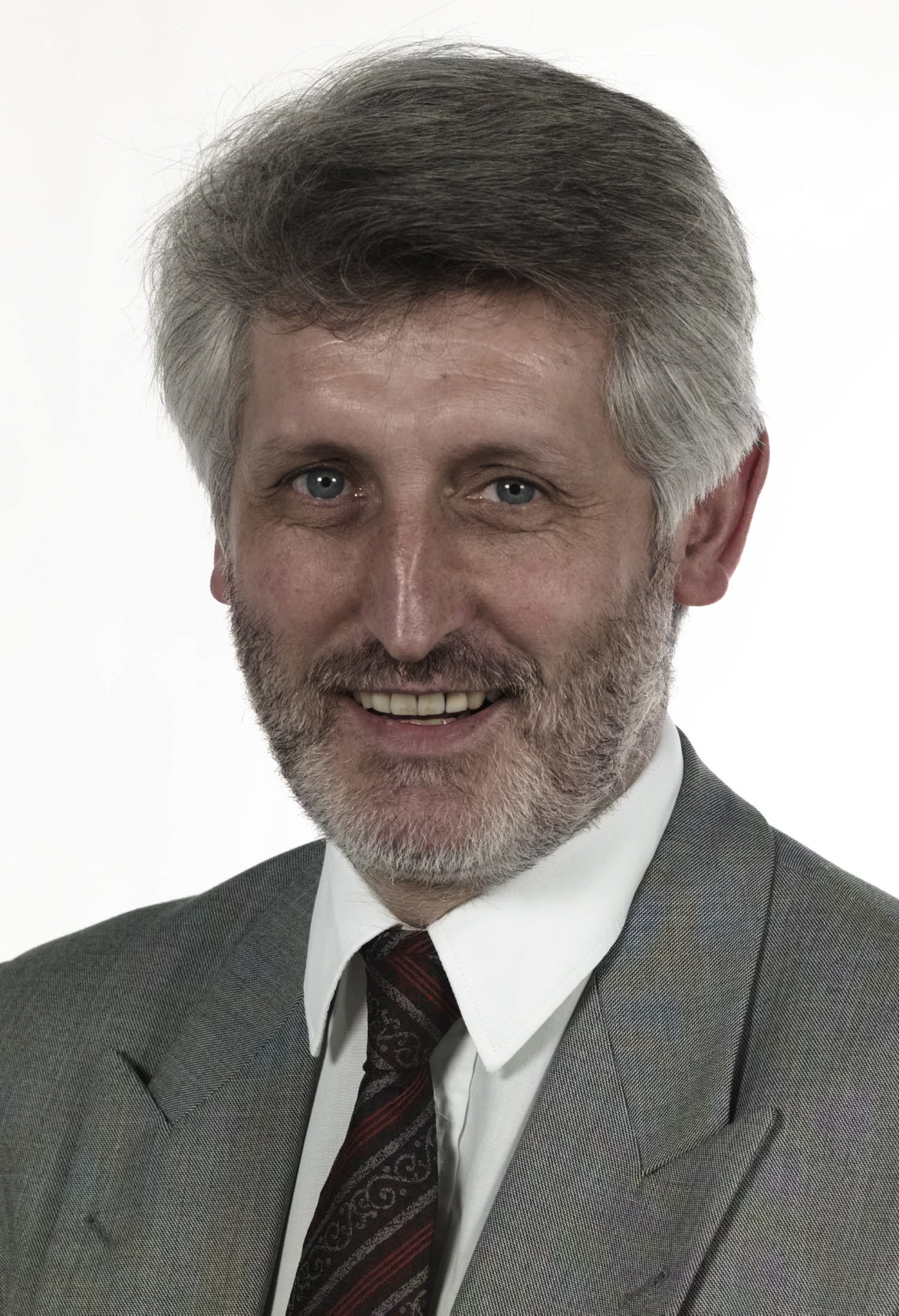
- Official portrait, 1999

Member of the European Parliament for Glasgow (1994–1999) and Scotland (1999–2004)
- In office 1994–2004
- Preceded by: Janey Buchan

Personal details
- Born: William Miller; 22 July 1954 (age 72) Gartocharn, Scotland, United KIngdom
- Party: Labour
- Other political affiliations: Party of European Socialists
- Education: Kingston University

William Miller (born 22 July 1954) is a Scottish former Labour Party politician who served as a Member of the European Parliament representing Glasgow and Scotland from 1994 to 2004.

== Personal life ==
Miller was born and raised in Gartocharn and was educated at Paisley Technical College and Kingston Polytechnic. He was a chartered surveyor by profession and is married with one son and one daughter.

== Political life ==
Miller was chairman of the Glasgow Labour Party between 1984 and 1987 as well as acting as an election agent and was assistant secretary of the Glasgow branch of Nalgo between 1980 and 1986.

He served as a regional councillor for Strathclyde (from 1984 to 1994), chairing the council's Economic and Industrial Development Committee.

He was elected to the European Parliament in 1994, representing Glasgow. He served in Glasgow until the 1999 European Parliament election, when he began representing Scotland as a whole. He was not re-elected in the 2004 European Parliament election after having been relegated to third on Labour's regional list, a position that he described as a "walk-on part."

In the Parliament, Miller served as Labour Party whip and was a member of the Parliament's Economic, Monetary and Industrial Affairs Committee and the delegation for ASEAN, South East Asia and Korea. He had also been a vice-chair of the European Parliament's legal affairs and internal market committee.

He was described by the Financial Times as a "Glasgow bruiser" for his acrimonious relationship with other Labour MEPs.

Since losing his seat in the European Parliament, Miller has continued to seek a Parliamentary seat to continue his political career. He has also worked for the Scottish Funding Council (the body which funds colleges).
