= Glasgow (European Parliament constituency) =

Former European Parliament constituency

- European Parliament constituency
- Boundary within Scotland (1979-1984)
- Member state: United Kingdom
- Created: 1979
- Dissolved: 1999
- MEPs: 1

Prior to its uniform adoption of proportional representation in 1999, the United Kingdom used first-past-the-post for the European elections in England, Scotland and Wales. The European Parliament constituencies used under that system were smaller than the later regional constituencies and only had one Member of the European Parliament each. The constituency of Glasgow was one of them.

Boundary within Scotland (1984-1999)

== Boundaries ==
1979-1984: Glasgow Cathcart, Glasgow Central, Glasgow Craigton, Glasgow Garscadden, Glasgow Govan, Glasgow Hillhead, Glasgow Kelvingrove, Glasgow Maryhill, Glasgow Pollok, Glasgow Provan, Glasgow Queen's Park, Glasgow Shettleston, Glasgow Springburn.

1984-1999: Glasgow Cathcart, Glasgow Central, Glasgow Garscadden, Glasgow Govan, Glasgow Hillhead, Glasgow Maryhill, Glasgow Pollok, Glasgow Provan, Glasgow Shettleston, Glasgow Springburn.

== Members of the European Parliament ==
Elected	Member	Party
1979	Janey Buchan	Labour
1984	Janey Buchan	Labour
1989	Janey Buchan	Labour
1994	Bill Miller	Labour

== Election results ==
European elections 1994: Glasgow
Party	Candidate	Votes	%	±%
Labour	Bill Miller	83,953	52.6	–2.8
SNP	Tom Chalmers	40,795	25.6	+0.7
Scottish Militant Labour	Tommy Sheridan	12,113	7.6	New
Conservative	Richard M. Wilkinson	10,888	6.8	–3.9
Liberal Democrats	John Money	7,291	4.6	+2.6
Green	Phil J. O'Brien	2,252	1.4	–4.9
Socialist (GB)	James Fleming	1,195	0.7	New
Natural Law	Marc R. Wilkinson	868	0.5	New
International Communist	Christopher H. Marsden	381	0.2	+0.1
Majority		43,158	27.0	–3.5
Turnout		159,736	34.5	–5.4
Labour hold		Swing	–1.8	

European elections 1989: Glasgow
Party	Candidate	Votes	%	±%
Labour	Janey Buchan	107,818	55.4	–3.8
SNP	A. Brophy	48,586	24.9	+14.2
Conservative	Mrs. Aileen K. Bates	20,761	10.7	–5.8
Green	David L. Spaven	12,229	6.3	New
SLD	John Morrison	3,887	2.0	New
Communist	D. Chalmers	1,164	0.6	New
International Communist	J. Simons	193	0.1	New
Majority		59,232	30.5	–2.2
Turnout		194,638	39.9	+10.3
Labour hold		Swing	–9.0	

European elections 1984: Glasgow
Party	Candidate	Votes	%	±%
Labour	Janey Buchan	91,015	59.2	+10.2
Conservative	Miss Sally C. Chadd	25,282	16.5	–10.8
Liberal	Christopher M. Mason	20,867	13.6	+6.3
SNP	Norman M.T.M. MacLeod	16,456	10.7	–5.7
Majority		65,733	32.7	+11.0
Turnout		153,620	29.6	+1.4
Labour hold		Swing	+10.5	

European elections 1979: Glasgow
Party	Candidate	Votes	%	±%
Labour	Janey Buchan	73,846	49.0	
Conservative	Mrs. Barbara Vaughan	41,144	27.3	
SNP	George Leslie	24,776	16.4	
Liberal	Elspeth Attwooll	11,073	7.3	
Majority		32,702	21.7	
Turnout		150,704	28.2	
Labour win (new seat)				
